= Grigoriev Institute for Medical Radiology =

Soviet-Ukrainian research institute

- Established: 30 July 1920
- Chair: Mykola Krasnoselskyi
- Staff: 470
- Owner: National Academy of Medical Science of Ukraine (NAMS)
- Address: 82 Pushkinska St., Kharkiv, 61024, Ukraine
- Location: Kharkiv, Ukraine
- Website: medradiologia.org.ua

Grigoriev Institute for Medical Radiology (GIMR) is a medical radiology and oncology research institution in Kharkiv, Ukraine, founded in 1920. GIMR works in the areas of radiation oncology, radiology, radiotherapy, clinical radiobiology, radiation dosimetry in medicine, and radiation safety for patients and medical personnel. The main campus is located at 82 Pushkinska St., Kharkiv, Ukraine.

== History ==
The Institute was founded on July 30, 1920 by the Decree of the Council of People's Commissars of the Ukrainian SSR as the All-Ukrainian X-ray Academy.

In 1925, it was renamed to the Ukrainian X-ray and Radiological Institute, which was reorganized on December 15, 1955 by order No. 591 of the Ministry of Healthcare of Ukraine into the Kharkov Scientific Research Institute of Medical Radiology with the main scientific focus called "Scientific Foundations of Medical Radiology".According to the Decree of the Cabinet of Ministers of Ukraine No. 1232 from 7 August 2000, the Institute was transferred to the Academy of Medical Sciences of Ukraine and renamed as State Organization “Grigoriev Institute for Medical Radiology of the National Academy of Medical Science of Ukraine” (Order of the Academy of Medical Sciences of Ukraine No. 51 from September 29, 2000).

== Mission ==
For the last 20 years, the institute acts as the chief clinical research body in Ukraine in areas of radiation and clinical oncology, radiotherapy, nuclear medicine, treatment of radiation injuries, clinical radiobiology and radiation protection of patients and medical personnel.

== Research ==
All scientific and practical activities of the GIMR are aimed at the development and implementation into the healthcare applications of novel solutions in clinical oncology, radiation diagnostics, radiotherapy, radiation pathology, dosimetry and hygiene of medical irradiations.

== National and international collaborations ==
Scientific interactions with Western and international scientific institutions include a long term cooperation with the International Atomic Energy Agency (Vienna, Austria), the Center of Radiation, Chemical and Environmental Hazards of the Public Health England (former Health Protection Agency, earlier the National Radiological Protection Board, the UK) and various institutions in EU countries via collaboration within the CEC-EU funded research programs.

== See also ==
- Health in Ukraine
- Ministry of Healthcare (Ukraine)
- Public Health England
