= Demographics of Ukraine =

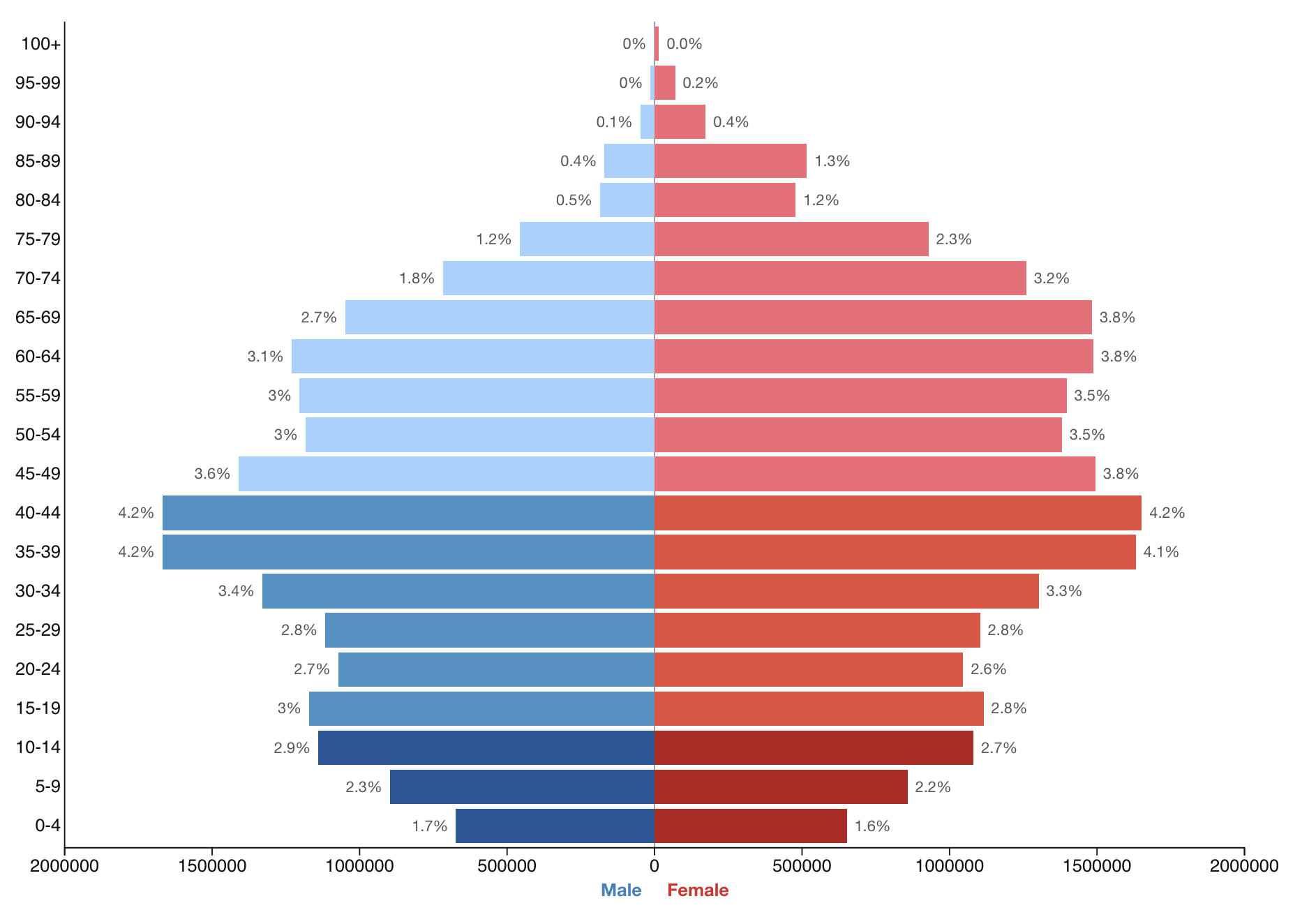
- Ukraine's population pyramid, 2026
- Population: Including Russian occupied territory in 2022: 41,130,432 ▼ (State Statistics Service of Ukraine); Excluding Russian occupied territory: 36,744,636 ▼ (UN Department of Economic and Social Affairs); 33,443,000 estimate in 2024 ▼ (International Monetary Fund)
- Growth rate: −6.6 ▼ people/1,000 population (2023)
- Birth rate: 5.4 ▲ births/1,000 population (2023)
- Death rate: 15.2 ▼ deaths/1,000 population (2023)
- Life expectancy: 72.20 years ▲ (2018)
  - male: 67.69 ▼ years
  - female: 76.72 ▲ years
- Fertility rate: 1.26 ▲ children born/woman (2022)
- Infant mortality: 7.0 deaths/1,000 live births ▼ (2019)
- Net migration rate: −5.4 migrant(s)/1,000 population (2015)
- Immigrant share: 13.4% (2024)

Age structure
- 0–14 years: ▲15.4%
- 15–64 years: ▼68.4%
- 65 and over: ▲16.2% (2017)

Sex ratio
- Total: 0.84 male(s)/female (2008 est.)
- At birth: 1.06 male(s)/female
- Under 15: 1.06 male(s)/female
- 15–64 years: 0.92 male(s)/female
- 65 and over: 0.51 male(s)/female

Nationality
- Nationality: noun: Ukrainian(s) adjective: Ukrainian
- Major ethnic: Ukrainians (77.8%) 2001
- Minor ethnic: Russians (17.3%) 2001, Other (4.9%) 2001

Language
- Official: Ukrainian
- Spoken: Ukrainian, Russian, others

Animated population pyramid from 1950 to 2026

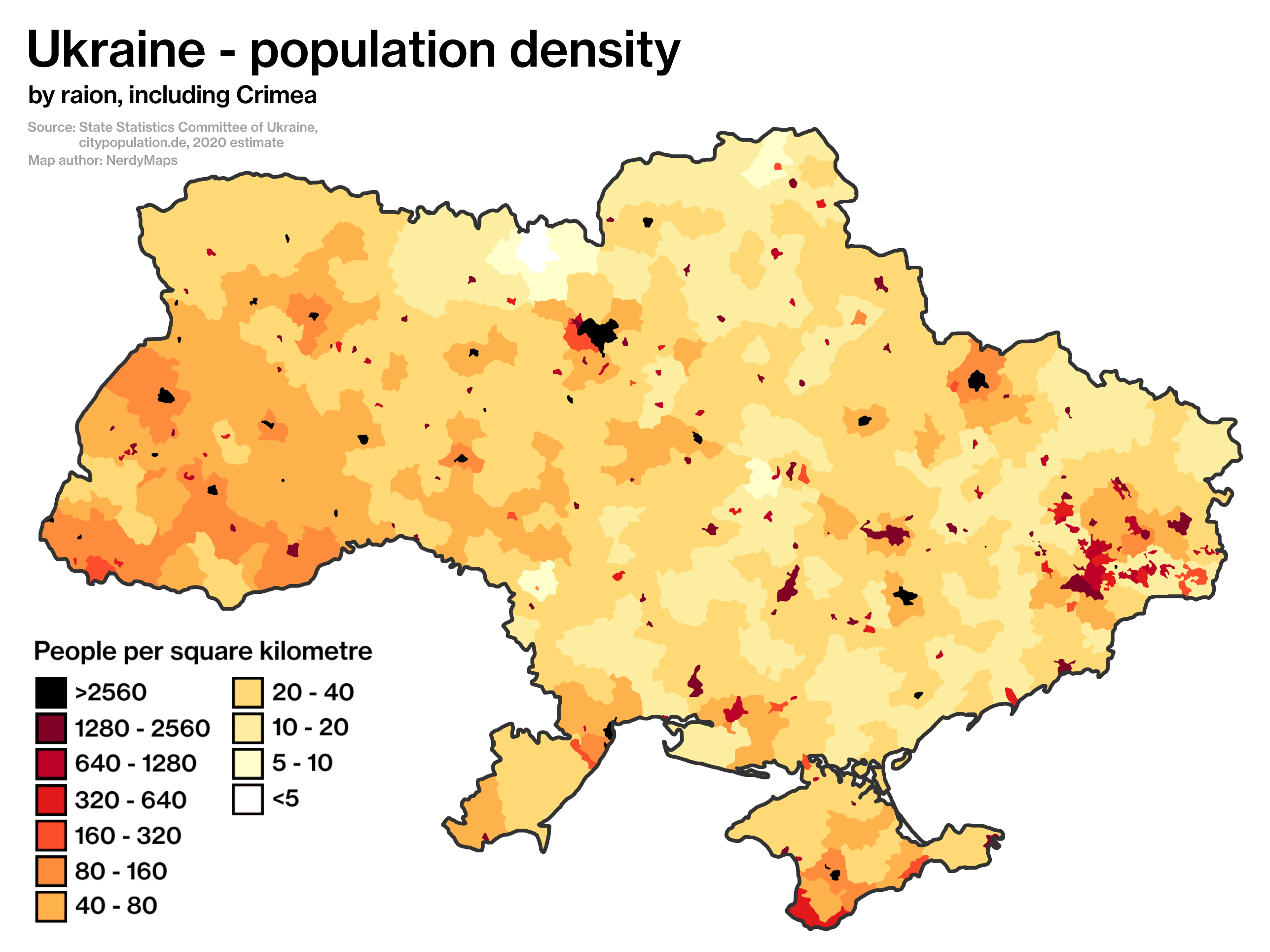
Ukrainian population density by raion

According to the United Nations, Ukraine has a population of 36.7 million as of 2023.

In July 2023, Reuters reported that due to refugee outflows, the population of Ukrainian-controlled areas may have decreased to 28 million, a steep decline from Ukraine's 2020 population of almost 42 million.

This drop is in large part due to the ongoing Ukrainian refugee crisis and loss of territory caused by the Russo-Ukrainian war, which resulted in mass emigration. The demographic decline is also affected by a very low birth rate and a high mortality rate. The most recent (and only) census of post-Soviet Ukraine occurred in 2001, and much of the information presented is potentially inaccurate or outdated.

Since 2021, the Ukrainian fertility rate has fallen below 1.3, and is now one of the lowest in the world. By 2024, it was one of the ten lowest in the world, falling under 1.00.

== History ==
=== Historical population ===
There were roughly four million Ukrainians at the end of the 17th century. However, population estimates from this period are approximate and may vary depending on methodology and available records.

The estimated population figures for Ukraine in the early 20th century are based on various sources. The 1931 population statistics were estimated by Professor Zenon Kuzelia, as an official census was not conducted in Soviet Ukraine during that year.

=== Population change ===
The following graph represents Ukraine's population trends since the early 20th century.

View source data.

Data for 1926–2001 is based on official Soviet and Ukrainian censuses. The 2014 and 2020 figures are adjusted estimates, excluding Crimea and occupied territories in Donbas.

=== Natural change and migration ===
The natural population change, migration trends, and fertility rates are shown below:

View source data.
View source data.

Natural population change and migration data are sourced from the Ukrainian State Statistics Service. The fertility rate figures are derived from United Nations estimates.

=== Notes ===
- The population estimate for the 17th century is approximate and based on historical demographic models.
- The 1931 population figure is not from an official census but from an academic estimate.
- Post-2014 population figures exclude Crimea and parts of Donetsk and Luhansk regions under occupation.

== Famines and migration ==
=== Demographic impact of the Holodomor and World War II ===
The Ukrainian famines of the 1930s and the devastation of World War II created a demographic catastrophe for Ukraine. In 1933, life expectancy at birth dropped to as low as 10 years for females and 7 years for males. During 1941–1944, life expectancy plateaued around 25 years for females and 15 years for males.

According to The Oxford Companion to World War II, over 7 million Ukrainians — more than one-sixth of the pre-war population — were killed during the conflict.

=== Migration trends in independent Ukraine ===
Following Ukraine's independence, significant migration occurred:

- 1991–1992: Over 1 million people moved into Ukraine, primarily from other former Soviet republics.
- 1991–2004: A total of 2.2 million immigrants arrived in Ukraine, with 2 million of these coming from other former Soviet Union states.
- Between 1991 and 2004, 2.5 million emigrated from Ukraine, with 1.9 million migrating to other former Soviet Union republics.

As of 2015, immigrants made up an estimated 11.4% of the total population of Ukraine, equating to 4.8 million people.

=== Ukrainian diaspora ===
In 2006, there were approximately 1.2 million Canadians of Ukrainian descent, giving Canada the third-largest Ukrainian population worldwide, behind Ukraine and Russia. Significant Ukrainian diaspora communities also exist in Poland, the United States, Brazil, Kazakhstan, and Argentina.

=== Recent migration trends and economic impact ===
Since about 2015, a growing number of Ukrainians have worked in the European Union, particularly in Poland. According to Eurostat, 662,000 Ukrainians received EU residence permits in 2017, with 585,439 of these residing in Poland.

World Bank statistics from 2019 revealed that remittances sent back to Ukraine had approximately doubled from 2015 to 2018, making up about 4% of Ukraine's GDP.

Ukraine records only citizens who apply for foreign citizenship, not those who seek foreign residency.

=== Migration during the Russo-Ukrainian war ===
After the 2022 Russian invasion of Ukraine, approximately 9 million people fled Ukraine during the ensuing Ukrainian refugee crisis, Europe's largest refugee crisis since World War II. Most refugees sought asylum in Central Europe.

== Population decline ==
Population of Ukraine from 1950

According to estimates by the State Statistics Service of Ukraine, the population of Ukraine (excluding Crimea) on 1 May 2021 was 41,442,615.

The country's population has been declining since the 1990s because of a high emigration rate, coupled with high death rates and low birth rates. The population has been shrinking by an average of over 300,000 annually since 1993.

In 2007, the country's rate of population decline was the fourth highest in the world. But between 2008 and 2010, over 1.5 million children were born in Ukraine, compared with fewer than 1.2 million in 1999–2001. In 2008, Ukraine posted record-breaking birth rates not seen since its 1991 independence. Infant mortality rates also dropped from 10.4 deaths to 8.3 per 1,000 children under one year of age, a lower rate than in 153 other countries.

In 2019, the Ukrainian government conducted an electronic census using multiple sources, including mobile phone and pension data, and estimated that Ukraine's population, excluding Crimea and parts of the Donbas, to be 37.3 million. About 20 million were of active working age.

The Russian invasion considerably deepened the country's demographic crisis due to the military occupation and forced annexation of multiple oblasts, numerous civilians fleeing the country, and high casualties. A July 2023 study by the Vienna Institute for International Economic Studies stated the following:

"Regardless of how long the war lasts and whether or not there is further military escalation, Ukraine is unlikely to recover demographically from the consequences of the war. Even in 2040 it will have only about 35 million inhabitants, around 20% fewer than before the war (2021: 42.8 million) and the decline in the working-age population is likely to be the most severe and far-reaching."

The study examined different scenarios, from a "best case", in which the war ended in 2023 without significant further escalation, to a "worst case", ending in 2025 after further escalation. Flight from war particularly affects the southern and eastern regions and especially educated women of child-bearing age and their children. With an estimate of more than 20% of refugees not returning, the author of the study Maryna Tverdostup concludes that this will lead to long-term shrinking and will significantly impair the conditions for reconstruction.

== Fertility and natalist policies ==
As of 2020, the birth rate in Ukraine was 8.1 live births/1,000 population, and the death rate 14.7 deaths/1,000 population.

Lowest-low fertility, defined as total fertility below 1.3, is being encountered across Europe, attributed by many to postponement of the initiation of childbearing. Ukraine, where total fertility (1.1 in 2001), was one of the world's lowest, shows that there is more than one pathway to lowest-low fertility. Although Ukraine underwent immense political and economic transformations from 1991 to 2004, it maintained a young age at first birth and nearly universal childbearing. Analysis of official national statistics and the Ukrainian Reproductive Health Survey show that fertility declined to very low levels without a transition to a later pattern of childbearing. Findings from focus group interviews suggest that the early fertility pattern was explained by the persistence of traditional norms for childbearing and the roles of men and women, concerns about medical complications and infertility at a later age, and the link between early fertility and early marriage. Ukraine subsequently has one of the oldest populations in the world, with an average age of 40.8 years.

To help mitigate population decline, the government increased child support payments, providing one-time payments of 12,250 hryvnias for the first child, 25,000 hryvnias for the second and 50,000 hryvnias for the third and fourth, along with monthly payments of 154 hryvnias per child. The demographic trend showed signs of improvement as the birth rate grew steadily from 2001 to 2013. Five of the country's 24 provinces showed net population growth over the first nine months of 2007, and nationwide population decline showed signs of stabilization. In 2007, the highest birth rates were in the western oblasts. In 2008, Ukraine emerged from lowest-low fertility, and the upward trend continued to 2012, with population decline slowing year after year. If early 2010s trends had persisted, the population could have returned to positive growth later that decade. Similar trends occurred in Russia and Belarus, which experienced population growth in the 2010s.

In 2014, the strong drop in births returned, and 2018 saw fewer than half the number of births of 1989 (see demographic tables). In 2020, the number of births decreased to 293,000, reaching rates not seen in a quarter century.

Mass emigration and property destruction caused by the Russian invasion led Ukraine's birth rate to drop still further: it was 28% lower in the first half of 2023 than the first half of 2021. However, a small but meaningful increase in births may occur in the future, with a projected fertility rate increase to 1.60 children per woman in the year 2030, higher than the 2012 peak of 1.53.

== Population ==
Life expectancy in Ukraine since 1900

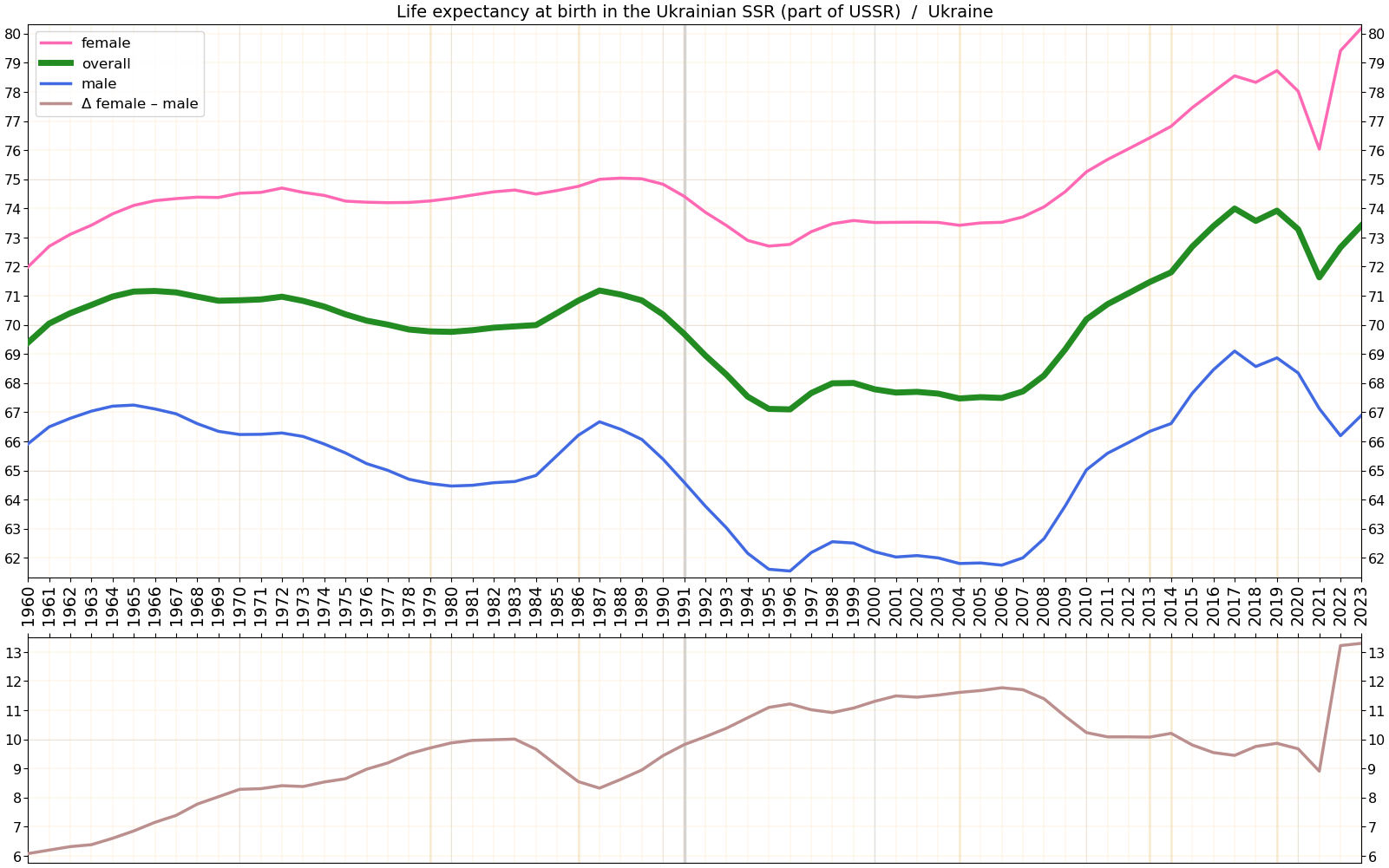
Life expectancy in Ukraine since 1960 by gender

=== Life expectancy ===
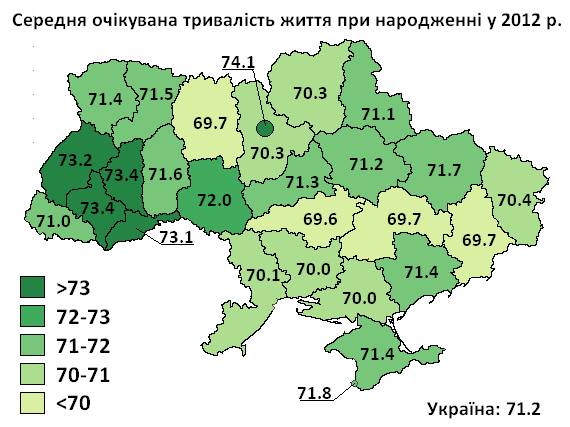
Life expectancy at birth by oblast, 2012

- total population: 71.37 ▲ years
- male: 66.34 ▲ years
- female: 76.22 ▲ years (2013 official)

Average life expectancy at birth of the total population.

Period	Life expectancy in Years
1950–1955	61.83
1955–1960	▲67.11
1960–1965	▲69.69
1965–1970	▲70.66
1970–1975	▼70.57
1975–1980	▼69.65
1980–1985	▼69.15
1985–1990	▲70.55
1990–1995	▼68.72
1995–2000	▼67.36
2000–2005	▲67.46
2005–2010	▲67.89
2010–2015	▲71.12

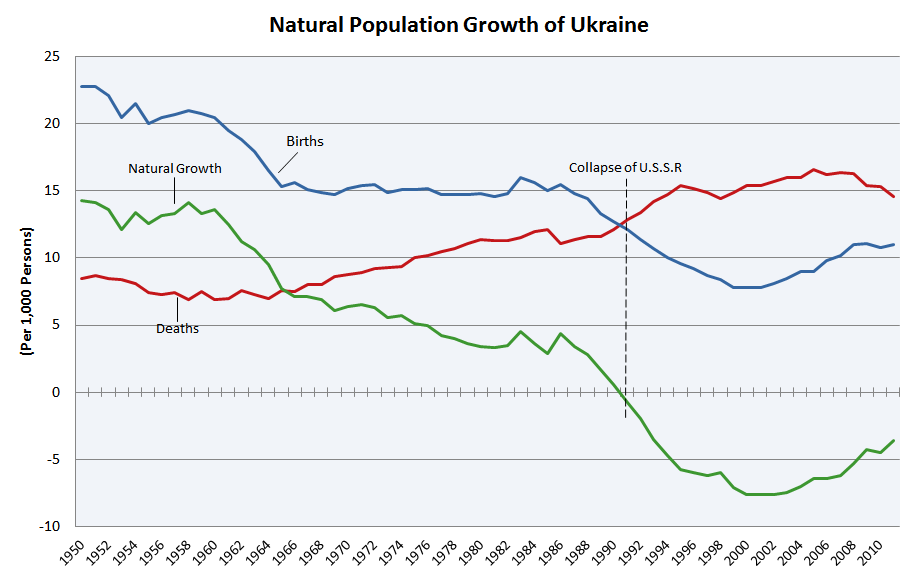
Natural population growth of Ukraine, 1950–2010. Birth rate Death rate Natural growth rate

=== Total fertility rate ===
- 1.12 ▼ children born/woman (2000)
- 1.44 ▲ children born/woman (2010)
- 1.22 ▼ children born/woman (2020)

== Vital statistics ==
Notable events in Ukrainian demographics:

- 1932–33 – Holodomor in Ukrainian Soviet Socialist Republic
- 1939 – Addition of western oblasts to Ukraine with the end of the Second Polish Republic due to German–Soviet invasion of Poland at the beginning of Second World War
- 1991 – Independence from the USSR
- 2004–2005 – Orange Revolution
- 2014 – Annexation of Crimea by the Russian Federation
- 2022 – Russian invasion of Ukraine

=== Ukrainian provinces of the Russian Empire (1900-1914) ===
The figures below refer to the nine governorates of the Russian Empire (Volhynia, Katerynoslav, Kyiv, Podilia, Poltava, Tauryda, Kharkiv, Kherson and Chernihiv) with a Ukrainian majority. Note: This table uses the sticky table format to make scrolling easier. If preferred, it can be disabled.

	Average population	Live births	Deaths	Natural change	Crude birth rate (per 1,000)	Crude death rate (per 1,000)	Natural change (per 1,000)	Total fertility rates
1900	24,969,000	1,203,334	660,723	542,611	48.2	26.5	21.7	
1901	25,505,000	1,123,519	657,883	465,636	44.1	25.8	18.3	
1902	25,935,000	1,207,512	681,580	525,932	46.6	26.3	20.3	
1903	26,449,000	1,188,404	663,067	525,337	44.9	25.1	19.9	
1904	26,961,000	1,228,116	682,068	546,048	45.6	25.3	20.3	
1905	27,210,000	1,160,308	779,107	381,201	41.1	27.6	14.0	
1906	27,949,000	1,225,951	724,045	501,906	43.9	25.9	18.0	
1907	28,418,000	1,279,027	701,451	577,576	45.0	24.7	20.3	
1908	29,069,000	1,232,862	692,624	540,238	42.4	23.8	18.6	
1909	29,700,000	1,226,155	744,818	481,337	41.3	25.1	16.2	
1910	30,297,000	1,225,658	839,491	386,167	40.5	27.7	12.7	
1911	30,858,000	1,240,985	670,742	570,243	40.2	21.7	18.5	
1912	30,580,000	1,245,358	654,157	591,201	40.7	21.4	19.3	
1913	31,142,000	1,222,277	715,924	506,353	39.2	23.0	16.3	6.00
1914	30,973,000	1,240,114	716,875	523,239	40.0	23.1	16.9	

=== Between WWI and WWII (1924-1940) ===
Note: This table uses the sticky table format to make scrolling easier. If preferred, it can be disabled.

	Average population	Live births	Deaths	Natural change	Crude birth rate (per 1,000)	Crude death rate (per 1,000)	Natural change (per 1,000)	Fertility rates	Life Expectancy (male)	Life Expectancy (female)
1924	27,400,000	1,211,000	484,880	726,120	43.3	17.3	25.9			
1925	28,000,000	1,246,000	531,819	714,181	43.4	18.5	24.9	5.39		
1926	28,700,000	1,258,000	518,656	739,344	42.5	17.5	25.0			
1927	29,589,000	1,228,000	579,000	649,000	40.6	19.1	21.5		43.3	46.8
1928	30,251,000	1,178,000	575,000	603,000	38.1	18.6	19.5		44.6	48.7
1929	30,894,000	1,115,000	585,000	530,000	35.5	18.6	16.9		42.8	46.7
1930	31,436,000	1,053,000	580,000	473,000	33.0	18.2	14.8		42.5	46.9
1931	31,882,000	1,001,000	553,000	448,000	31.0	17.1	13.9		43.5	47.9
1932	32,342,000	801,000	746,000	55,000	24.7	23.0	1.7		34.5	39.4
1933	32,456,000	564,000	2,104,000	−1,540,000	17.4	64.8	−47.4			
1934	30,916,000	562,000	508,000	54,000	18.1	16.4	1.7		37.6	42.1
1935	31,006,000	770,000	381,000	389,000	24.5	12.1	12.4		46.3	52.7
1936	31,423,000	905,000	403,000	502,000	28.3	12.6	15.7		47.6	53.0
1937	31,957,000	1,227,000	450,000	777,000	37.5	13.7	23.7		46.2	51.9
1938	32,742,000	1,123,000	451,000	672,000	33.6	13.5	20.1		47.9	52.7
1939	33,425,000	1,080,000	412,600	667,400	31.7	12.1	19.6		47.7	52.5
1940(b)	40,649,000	1,243,000			30.6			3.80	47.4	52.4

(a) Information is given for Ukraine's territory within its old boundaries up to 17 September 1939 (b) Information is given for Ukraine's territory within its present-day boundaries, after the Soviet annexation of Eastern Galicia and Volhynia in September 1939.

=== After WWII (1945-present) ===
Source: State Statistics Service of Ukraine Note: This table uses the sticky table format to make scrolling easier. If preferred, it can be disabled.

	Average population	Live births	Deaths	Natural change	Crude birth rate (per 1,000)	Crude death rate (per 1,000)	Natural change (per 1,000)	Crude migration rate (per 1,000)	Fertility rates	Urban fertility	Rural fertility	Abortions, reported
1945	34,074,000	435,230										
1946	34,622,000	753,493										
1947	35,179,000	712,994										
1948	35,746,000	757,783										
1949	36,321,000	911,641										
1950	36,905,000	844,585	315,300	529,300	22.9	8.5	14.3		2.81			
1951	37,569,000	858,052	327,500	530,600	22.8	8.7	14.1	3.6	2.76			
1952	38,141,000	846,434	325,700	520,700	22.2	8.5	13.7	1.4	2.64			
1953	38,678,000	795,652	326,800	468,900	20.6	8.4	12.1	1.8	2.41			
1954	39,131,000	845,128	318,500	526,600	21.6	8.1	13.5	-1.9	2.48			
1955	39,506,000	792,696	296,200	496,500	20.1	7.5	12.6	-3.1	2.70			
1956	40,082,000	822,569	293,000	529,600	20.5	7.3	13.2	1.2	2.29			
1957	40,800,000	847,781	304,800	543,000	20.8	7.5	13.3	4.4	2.29			
1958	41,512,000	873,483	286,700	586,800	21.0	6.9	14.1	3.1	2.30			
1959	42,155,000	880,552	316,800	563,800	20.9	7.5	13.4	1.9	2.29			
1960	42,469,000	878,768	296,171	582,597	20.7	7.0	13.7	-6.4	2.24			
1961	43,097,000	843,482	304,346	539,136	19.6	7.1	12.5	2.1	2.17			
1962	43,559,000	823,151	331,454	491,697	18.9	7.6	11.3	-0.7	2.14			
1963	44,088,000	794,969	323,556	471,413	17.9	7.3	10.6	1.3	2.06			
1964	44,664,000	741,668	315,340	426,328	16.5	7.0	9.5	3.4	1.96			
1965	45,133,000	692,153	342,717	349,436	15.3	7.6	7.7	2.7	1.99			
1966	45,548,000	713,492	344,850	368,642	15.6	7.5	8.1	1.9	2.02			
1967	45,997,000	699,381	368,573	330,808	15.1	8.0	7.2	2.6	2.01			
1968	46,408,000	693,064	374,440	318,624	14.9	8.0	6.9	2.0	1.99			
1969	46,778,000	687,991	404,151	283,840	14.7	8.6	6.1	7.4	2.04			
1970	47,127,000	719,213	418,679	300,534	15.2	8.9	6.4	1.0	2.10			1,130,315
1971	47,507,000	736,691	424,717	311,974	15.4	8.9	6.6	1.4	2.12			
1972	47,903,000	745,696	443,038	302,658	15.5	9.2	6.3	2.0	2.08			
1973	48,274,000	719,560	449,351	270,209	14.9	9.3	5.6	2.1	2.04			
1974	48,571,000	736,616	455,970	280,646	15.1	9.4	5.8	0.3	2.04			
1975	48,881,000	738,857	489,550	249,307	15.1	10.0	5.1	1.2	2.02			1,110,223
1976	49,151,000	747,069	500,584	246,485	15.2	10.2	5.0	0.5	1.99			
1977	49,388,000	726,217	517,967	208,250	14.7	10.5	4.2	4.4	1.94			
1978	49,578,000	732,187	529,681	202,506	14.7	10.7	4.1	-0.3	1.96			
1979	49,755,000	735,188	552,019	183,169	14.7	11.1	3.7	-0.1	1.96			
1980	50,044,000	742,489	568,243	174,246	14.8	11.4	3.5	2.3	1.95			1,197,000
1981	50,222,000	733,183	568,789	164,394	14.6	11.3	3.3	0.3	1.93			1,112,734
1982	50,388,000	745,591	568,231	177,360	14.8	11.3	3.5	3.0	1.94			1,131,437
1983	50,573,000	807,111	583,496	223,615	16.0	11.6	4.4	-0.8	2.11			1,125,686
1984	50,768,000	792,035	610,338	181,697	15.6	12.0	3.6	0.3	2.08			1,127,627
1985	50,941,000	762,775	617,548	145,227	15.0	12.1	2.9	0.5	2.02			1,179,000
1986	51,143,000	792,574	565,150	227,424	15.5	11.1	4.4	-0.5	2.13			1,166,039
1987	51,373,000	760,851	586,387	174,464	14.8	11.4	3.4	1.1	2.07			1,168,136
1988	51,593,000	744,056	600,725	143,331	14.4	11.6	2.8	1.5	2.04			1,080,029
1989	51,770,000	690,981	600,590	90,391	13.3	11.6	1.7	1.7	1.92	1.78	2.33	1,058,414
1990	51,838,500	657,202	629,602	27,600	12.7	12.1	0.5	1.3	1.84	1.69	2.27	1,019,038
1991	51,944,400	630,813	669,960	−39,147	12.1	12.9	−0.8	2.8	1.78	1.60	2.29	957,022
1992	52,056,600	596,785	697,110	−100,325	11.4	13.4	−1.9	4.1	1.67	1.48	2.23	932,272
1993	52,244,100	557,467	741,662	−184,195	10.7	14.2	−3.5	7.1	1.56	1.37	2.08	860,996
1994	52,114,400	521,545	764,669	−243,124	10.0	14.7	−4.7	2.2	1.47	1.28	1.98	798,538
1995	51,728,400	492,861	792,587	−299,726	9.6	15.4	−5.8	-1.7	1.40	1.21	1.88	740,172
1996	51,297,100	467,211	776,717	−309,506	9.2	15.2	−6.0	-2.4	1.34	1.16	1.79	687,035
1997	50,818,400	442,581	754,151	−311,570	8.7	14.9	−6.1	-3.3	1.27	1.10	1.70	596,740
1998	50,370,800	419,238	719,954	−300,716	8.4	14.4	−6.0	-2.9	1.21	1.05	1.64	525,329
1999	49,918,100	389,208	739,170	−349,962	7.8	14.9	−7.0	-2.0	1.13	0.97	1.53	495,760
2000	49,429,800	385,126	758,082	−372,956	7.8	15.4	−7.6	-2.3	1.12	0.97	1.51	434,223
2001	48,923,200	376,478	745,952	−369,474	7.7	15.3	−7.6	-2.8	1.08	0.95	1.41	369,750
2002	48,457,102	390,688	754,911	−364,223	8.1	15.7	−7.6	-2.1	1.10	0.97	1.43	345,967
2003	48,003,463	408,589	765,408	−356,819	8.5	16.0	−7.4	-2.0	1.17	1.07	1.45	315,835
2004	47,622,434	427,259	761,261	−334,002	9.0	16.0	−7.0	-1.0	1.22	1.13	1.46	289,065
2005	47,280,817	426,086	781,961	−355,875	9.0	16.6	−7.5	0.3	1.21	1.12	1.46	263,950
2006	46,929,525	460,368	758,092	−297,724	9.8	16.2	−6.3	-1.1	1.31	1.21	1.59	229,618
2007	46,646,046	472,657	762,877	−290,220	10.2	16.4	−6.2	0.1	1.35	1.24	1.63	210,454
2008	46,372,664	510,589	754,460	−243,871	11.0	16.3	−5.3	-0.6	1.46	1.35	1.75	217,413
2009	46,143,714	512,525	706,739	−194,214	11.1	15.3	−4.2	-0.7	1.47	1.35	1.78	194,845
2010	45,962,947	497,689	698,235	−200,546	10.8	15.2	−4.4	0.4	1.44	1.31	1.77	176,774
2011	45,778,534	502,595	664,588	−161,993	11.0	14.5	−3.5	-0.5	1.46	1.32	1.80	169,131
2012	45,633,637	520,705	663,139	−142,434	11.4	14.5	−3.1	-0.1	1.53	1.39	1.87	153,147
2013	45,553,047	503,657	662,368	−158,711	11.1	14.6	−3.5	1.7	1.51	1.37	1.83	147,736
2014	45,426,249	465,882	632,296	−166,414	10.3	14.0	−3.7	0.9	1.50	1.35	1.83	116,104
2015	42,929,298	411,781	594,796	−183,015	9.6	13.9	−4.3	-50.9	1.51	1.39	1.71	106,357
2016	42,760,516	397,037	583,631	−186,594	9.3	13.6	−4.3	0.4	1.47	1.36	1.64	101,121
2017	42,584,542	363,987	574,123	−210,136	8.5	13.5	−5.0	0.8	1.37	1.28	1.52	94,665
2018	42,386,403	335,874	587,665	−251,791	7.9	13.9	−6.0	1.3	1.30	1.22	1.43	46,552
2019	42,153,201	308,817	581,114	−272,297	7.3	13.8	−6.5	0.9	1.23	1.16	1.34	74,606
2020	41,902,416	293,457	616,835	−323,378	7.0	14.7	−7.7	1.7	1.22	1.13	1.36	
2021	41,443,336	271,983	714,263	−442,280	6.6	17.2	−10.6	-7.0	1.16	1.08	1.29	
2022	30,000,000≈	206,032	541,739	−335,707	6.8	13.2	−6.4	-139.2	1.00 (e)			
2023	31,300,000(e)	187,387	496,200	–308,813	5.98	14.2	–8.8	-64.0	0.94			
2024	29,500,000(e)	176,679	495,090	–318,310	5.99	15.5	-10.0	-28.7	0.9			
2025	28,700,000(e)	168,778	485,296	–316,518	5.82	16.9	-11.0					
1H2026	28,000,000(e)	73,292	259,853	–186,561	5.1?	18?	-12.9					

=== Urban-Rural (1990-2019) ===
Note: This table uses the sticky table format to make scrolling easier. If preferred, it can be disabled.

	Urban live births	Urban deaths	Urban natural change	Urban crude birth rate (per 1,000)	Urban crude death rate (per 1,000)	Urban natural change (per 1,000)	Rural live births	Rural deaths	Rural natural change	Rural crude birth rate (per 1,000)	Rural crude death rate (per 1,000)	Rural natural change (per 1,000)
1990	442,869	357,114	85,755	12.7	10.2	2.5	214,333	272,488	−58,155	12.7	16.1	−3.4
1991	419,205	380,988	38,217	11.9	10.8	1.1	211,608	288,972	−77,364	12.6	17.2	−4.6
1992	387,696	401,849	−14,153	11.0	11.4	−0.4	209,089	295,261	−86,172	12.5	17.6	−5.1
1993	356,833	432,462	−75,629	10.1	12.2	−2.1	200,634	309,200	−108,566	12.0	18.5	−6.5
1994	328,522	450,823	−122,301	9.3	12.8	−3.5	193,023	313,846	−120,823	11.6	18.8	−7.2
1995	308,408	476,434	−168,026	8.8	13.6	−4.8	184,453	316,153	−131,700	11.1	19.1	−8.0
1996	291,121	460,805	−169,684	8.4	13.3	−4.9	176,090	315,912	−139,822	10.7	19.2	−8.5
1997	274,961	444,446	−169,485	8.0	13.0	−5.0	167,620	309,705	−142,085	10.2	18.9	−8.7
1998	258,724	425,521	−166,797	7.6	12.6	−5.0	160,514	294,433	−133,919	9.9	18.1	−8.2
1999	239,408	439,986	−200,578	7.1	13.1	−6.0	149,800	299,184	−149,384	9.3	18.5	−9.2
2000	238,014	457,069	−219,055	7.2	13.8	−6.6	147,112	301,013	−153,901	9.2	18.8	−9.6
2001	237,228	450,329	−213,101	7.2	13.8	−6.6	139,250	295,623	−156,373	8.7	18.6	−9.9
2002	248,877	454,406	−205,529	7.7	14.0	−6.3	141,811	300,505	−158,694	9.0	19.1	−10.1
2003	266,415	459,965	−193,550	8.3	14.3	−6.0	142,174	305,443	−163,269	9.1	19.6	−10.5
2004	284,361	460,492	−176,131	8.9	14.4	−5.5	142,898	300,769	−157,871	9.3	19.6	−10.3
2005	284,257	471,561	−187,304	8.9	14.8	−5.9	141,829	310,400	−168,571	9.4	20.5	−11.1
2006	306,635	461,774	−155,139	9.6	14.5	−4.9	153,733	296,318	−142,585	10.3	19.8	−9.5
2007	314,065	466,253	−152,188	9.9	14.7	−4.8	158,592	296,624	−138,032	10.7	20.1	−9.4
2008	340,594	462,897	−122,303	10.8	14.6	−3.8	169,995	291,563	−121,568	11.6	19.9	−8.3
2009	339,497	432,294	−92,797	10.8	13.7	−2.9	173,028	274,445	−101,417	11.9	18.9	−7.0
2010	326,587	431,130	−104,543	10.4	13.7	−3.3	171,102	267,105	−96,003	11.9	18.6	−6.7
2011	328,934	411,025	−82,091	10.5	13.1	−2.6	173,661	253,563	−79,902	12.1	17.7	−5.6
2012	341,599	411,787	−70,188	10.9	13.1	−2.2	179,106	251,352	−72,246	12.6	17.7	−5.1
2013	330,284	412,553	−82,269	10.5	13.2	−2.7	173,373	249,815	−76,442	12.3	17.7	−5.4
2014	304,190	391,739	−87,549	10.2	13.2	−3.0	161,692	240,557	−78,865	12.2	18.1	−5.9
2015	266,082	358,749	−92,667	10.4	13.2	−2.8	145,699	236,047	−90,348	11.3	18.0	−6.7
2016	258,688	354,634	−95,946	10.0	13.2	−3.2	138,349	228,997	−90,648	10.8	17.6	−6.8
2017	237,874	350,549	−112,675	9.2	13.0	−3.8	126,113	223,574	−97,461	9.9	17.3	−7.4
2018	220,102	363,732	−143,630	8.5	13.4	−4.9	115,772	223,933	−108,161	9.2	17.5	−8.3
2019	202,646	362,660	−160,014	7.9	13.4	−5.5	106,171	218,454	−112,283	8.5	17.2	−8.7

Note: Data excludes Crimea starting in 2014.

=== Current vital statistics ===
Period	Live births	Deaths	Natural increase
January-June 2025	86,795	248,995	-162,200
January-June 2026	73,292	259,853	-186,561
Difference	▼ –13,503 (–15.56%)	▲ +10,858 (+4.4%)	▼ –24,329

Note: Russia occupied and later annexed the Crimean Peninsula in 2014. The annexation is internationally recognized only by a small number of nations. Following the occupation, the Ukrainian statistics service could no longer provide accurate data on Crimea. Thus, as of 2014, the territories of the Autonomous Republic of Crimea and the city of Sevastopol are not included in the Demographics of Ukraine but in the Demographics of Russia. All data from State Statistics Service of Ukraine.

== Structure of the population ==
Population Estimates by Sex and Age Group (01.I.2021) (The government of Ukraine has informed the United Nations that it is not in a position to provide statistical data on the Autonomous Republic of Crimea or the city of Sevastopol.):

Age group	Male	Female	Total	%
Total	19 195 376	22 223 341	41 418 717	100
0–4	871 807	817 549	1 689 356	4.08
5–9	1 184 223	1 113 485	2 297 708	5.55
10–14	1 179 905	1 112 800	2 292 705	5.54
15–19	978 279	923 149	1 901 428	4.59
20–24	1 029 297	969 836	1 999 133	4.83
25–29	1 323 862	1 255 946	2 579 808	6.23
30–34	1 705 251	1 646 672	3 351 923	8.09
35–39	1 758 922	1 739 010	3 497 932	8.45
40–44	1 533 807	1 583 673	3 117 480	7.53
45–49	1 420 874	1 541 601	2 962 475	7.15
50–54	1 269 395	1 447 927	2 717 322	6.56
55–59	1 285 999	1 603 824	2 889 823	6.98
60–64	1 225 350	1 685 084	2 910 434	7.03
65–69	921 671	1 454 610	2 376 281	5.74
70–74	656 532	1 190 134	1 846 666	4.46
75–79	323 037	740 699	1 063 736	2.57
80–84	335 863	874 371	1 210 234	2.92
85–89	113 869	308 482	422 351	1.02
90–94	54 945	164 392	219 337	0.53
95–99	15 892	37 973	53 865	0.13
100+	6 596	12 124	18 720	0.05
Age group	Male	Female	Total	Percent
0–14	3 235 935	3 043 834	6 279 769	15.16
15–64	13 531 036	14 396 722	27 927 758	67.43
65+	2 428 405	4 782 785	7 211 190	17.41

== Regional data ==
=== Population by oblast ===
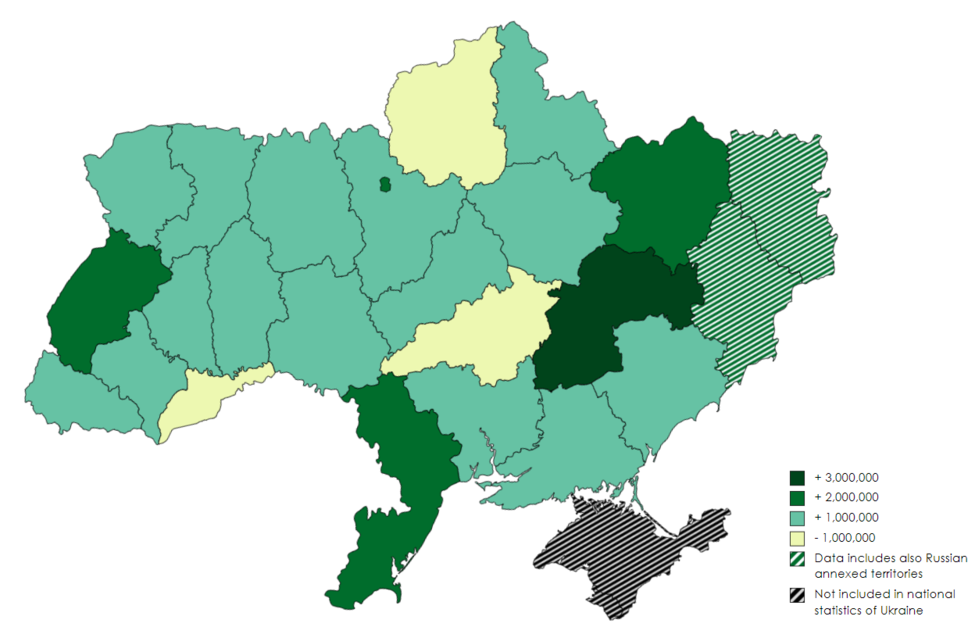
Population of Ukraine by Oblast as of December 2021

Name of Oblast	Population as of Dec 2021	According to the electronic census on December 1, 2019
Donetsk Oblast	4,062,839	1,981,200
Dnipropetrovsk Oblast	3,100,320	3,230,000
Kyiv City	2,952,577	3,703,100
Kharkiv Oblast	2,602,207	2,795,000
Lviv Oblast	2,480,137	2,290,100
Odesa Oblast	2,352,648	2,347,900
Luhansk Oblast	2,104,531	1,127,500
Kyiv Oblast	1,795,099	2,286,400
Zaporizhzhia Oblast	1,640,876	1,656,700
Vinnytsia Oblast	1,511,574	1,331,400
Poltava Oblast	1,354,444	1,337,000
Ivano-Frankivsk Oblast	1,352,973	1,125,700
Zakarpattia Oblast	1,245,491	924,700
Khmelnytskyi Oblast	1,230,507	1,024,700
Zhytomyr Oblast	1,180,638	1,062,600
Cherkasy Oblast	1,162,439	1,088,100
Rivne Oblast	1,142,599	943,600
Mykolaiv Oblast	1,093,492	1,053,200
Sumy Oblast	1,037,237	932,500
Ternopil Oblast	1,022,625	763,600
Volyn Oblast	1,022,107	903,600
Kherson Oblast	1,002,923	913,700
Chernihiv Oblast	961,054	912,600
Kirovohrad Oblast	905,715	826,800
Chernivtsi Oblast	891,054	727,500
Ukraine	41,208,106	37,289,400

=== Birth data by oblast ===
Note: Recent data for Donetsk and Luhansk Oblasts have been affected by the war in Donbas, and may only include births within the government-held parts of the oblasts.

Number of births by oblast for January–November	Birth/2016	Birth/2015	Death/2016	Death/2015
Kyiv City	33416 ▲	32382 ▲	27772 ▲	27767 ▲
Dnipropetrovsk Oblast	28473 ▼	30620 ▼	47934 ▼	49258 ▲
Lviv Oblast	25708 ▲	25007 ▼	29247 ▼	30010 ▲
Odesa Oblast	24246 ▼	25182 ▼	30479 ▼	31512 ▲
Kharkiv Oblast	21992 ▼	22864 ▼	38502 ▼	38965 ▲
Donetsk Oblast	17772 ▲	15608 ▼	33464 ▼	36883 ▼
Kyiv Oblast	17559 ▼	18485 ▼	25623 ▼	26046 ▲
Zakarpattia Oblast	14862 ▼	15525 ▼	13880 ▼	14164 ▲
Rivne Oblast	14454 ▼	14809 ▼	13261 ▼	13426 ▲
Zaporizhzhia Oblast	14430 ▼	15140 ▼	25533 ▼	25657 ▲
Vinnytsia Oblast	14153 ▼	15126 ▼	22521 ▼	23237 ▼
Ivano-Frankivsk Oblast	13547 ▼	14412 ▼	15616 ▼	16144 ▲
Volyn Oblast	12047 ▼	12307 ▼	12311 ▼	12602 ▲
Zhytomyr Oblast	11958 ▼	12526 ▼	18301 ▼	19085 ▼
Khmelnytskyi Oblast	11793 ▼	12768 ▼	18097 ▼	18702 ▲
Poltava Oblast	11503 ▼	12381 ▼	22084 ▼	22440 ▼
Mykolaiv Oblast	9904 ▼	10626 ▼	15834 ▼	16316 ▲
Kherson Oblast	9877 ▼	10476 ▼	14891 ▼	15055 ▲
Cherkasy Oblast	9721 ▼	10560 ▼	18437 ▲	18315 ▼
Chernivtsi Oblast	9461 ▼	9851 ▼	10399 ▼	10738 ▲
Ternopil Oblast	9177 ▼	9912 ▼	13584 ▼	13962 ▲
Kirovohrad Oblast	8189 ▼	8662 ▼	14810 ▲	14809 ▼
Sumy Oblast	8169 ▼	8959 ▼	16982 ▼	17322 ▼
Chernihiv Oblast	7816 ▼	8359 ▼	17515 ▼	18199 ▼
Luhansk Oblast	5960 ▲	4978 ▼	12689 ▼	13401 ▼

Number of births by oblast	Birth/2014	Birth/2013	Birth/2012	Birth/2011	Death/2014	Death/2013	Death/2012	Death/2011
Dnipropetrovsk Oblast	36497 ▲	36134 ▼	37087 ▲	36116 ▲	52722 ▲	51134 ▼	51486 ▼	52106 ▼
Donetsk Oblast	35595 ▼	41034 ▼	42839 ▲	41720 ▲	71799 ▲	69345 ▼	70496 ▼	71042 ▼
Kyiv City	34821 ▲	33305 ▼	33887 ▲	32068 ▼	29992 ▲	28003 ▲	27840 ▲	27050 ▼
Lviv Oblast	30270 ▲	29542 ▼	30220 ▲	28904 ▲	32450 ▲	31666 ▼	31667 ▲	31162 ▼
Odesa Oblast	29465 ▲	29075 ▼	30384 ▲	29225 ▲	34155 ▲	33523 ▼	33648 ▼	33688 ▼
Kharkiv Oblast	27690 ▲	26700 ▼	27244 ▲	26317 ▲	41891 ▲	39465 ▼	40130 ▲	40079 ▼
Kyiv Oblast	20900 ▲	20511 ▼	20966 ▲	20083 ▲	28264 ▲	27198 ▲	27161 ▲	26847 ▼
Zaporizhzhia Oblast	18713 ▲	18134 ▼	18882 ▲	18198 ▲	27773 ▲	26498 ▲	26406 ▼	27033 ▼
Zakarpattia Oblast	18377 ▼	18490 ▼	18968 ▲	18460 ▲	14808 ▲	14801 ▼	14813 ▲	14588 ▼
Vinnytsia Oblast	17547 ▲	17437 ▼	18339 ▲	17894 ▲	25567 ▲	25453 ▲	25158 ▼	25376 ▼
Rivne Oblast	17169 ▼	17445 ▼	18316 ▲	17697 ▲	14714 ▲	14556 ▲	14302 ▲	14168 ▼
Ivano-Frankivsk Oblast	16886 ▲	16716 ▼	17101 ▲	16497 ▲	17670 ▲	17358 ▲	16801 ▲	16657 ▼
Zhytomyr Oblast	15115 ▲	15001 ▼	15486 ▲	15154 ▲	21185 ▲	20859 ▲	20685 ▲	20417 ▼
Volyn Oblast	14668 ▼	14700 ▼	15346 ▲	14620 ▼	13748 ▲	13666 ▼	13710 ▼	13842 ▼
Khmelnytskyi Oblast	14631 ▲	14548 ▼	14881 ▲	14492 ▲	20408 ▼	20581 ▲	20362 ▲	20116 ▼
Poltava Oblast	14504 ▲	14296 ▼	14635 ▲	14167 ▼	24784 ▲	24358 ▲	24223 ▼	24384 ▼
Mykolaiv Oblast	13076 ▲	13043 ▼	13515 ▲	13029 ▲	17750 ▲	17353 ▲	17277 ▼	17441 ▼
Cherkasy Oblast	12351 ▲	12100 ▼	12798 ▲	12473 ▲	20800 ▲	20477 ▼	20667 ▼	20848 ▼
Kherson Oblast	12308 ▲	12300 ▼	12643 ▲	12085 ▼	16141 ▲	16048 ▲	15904 ▲	15828 ▼
Ternopil Oblast	11717 ▼	11807 ▼	12202 ▲	11964 ▲	15180 ▲	14682 ▼	14838 ▲	14829 ▼
Chernivtsi Oblast	11679 ▲	11465 ▼	11592 ▲	11281 ▲	11619 ▲	11520 ▲	11321 ▼	11192 ▼
Luhansk Oblast	11442 ▼	20531 ▼	21743 ▲	21320 ▲	22755 ▼	35822 ▼	36316 ▼	37256 ▼
Kirovohrad Oblast	10576 ▲	10562 ▼	11029 ▲	10578 ▲	16716 ▲	16513 ▼	16521 ▼	16697 ▼
Sumy Oblast	10344 ▼	10411 ▼	11093 ▲	10473 ▲	19452 ▲	19219 ▲	19002 ▲	18833 ▼
Chernihiv Oblast	9552 ▼	9852 ▼	10222 ▲	10134 ▲	20324 ▲	19909 ▼	20208 ▲	20179 ▼

Birth rate by oblast	Birth/2014	Birth/2013	Birth/2012	Birth/2011	Death/2014	Death/2013	Death/2012	Death/2011
Rivne Oblast	14.8 ▼	15.1 ▼	15.9 ▲	15.3 ▲	12.7 ▲	12.6 ▲	12.4 ▲	12.3 ▼
Zakarpattia Oblast	14.6 ▼	14.7 ▼	15.1 ▲	14.8 ▲	11.8	11.8	11.8 ▲	11.7 ▼
Volyn Oblast	14.1	14.1 ▼	14.8 ▲	14.1 ▼	13.2 ▲	13.1 ▼	13.2 ▼	13.3 ▼
Chernivtsi Oblast	12.9 ▲	12.6 ▼	12.8 ▲	12.5 ▲	12.8 ▲	12.7 ▲	12.5 ▲	12.4 ▼
Odesa Oblast	12.3 ▲	12.1 ▼	12.7 ▲	12.2 ▲	14.3 ▲	14.0 ▼	14.1	14.1 ▼
Ivano-Frankivsk Oblast	12.2 ▲	12.1 ▼	12.4 ▲	12.0 ▲	12.8 ▲	12.6 ▲	12.2 ▲	12.1 ▼
Kyiv Oblast	12.1 ▲	11.9 ▼	12.2 ▲	11.7 ▲	16.4 ▼	15.8	15.8 ▲	15.6 ▼
Kyiv City	12.1 ▲	11.7 ▼	12.0 ▲	11.4 ▼	10.4 ▲	9.8	9.8 ▲	9.6 ▼
Zhytomyr Oblast	12.0 ▲	11.9 ▼	12.2 ▲	11.9 ▲	16.8 ▲	16.5 ▲	16.3 ▲	16.0 ▼
Lviv Oblast	11.9 ▲	11.6 ▼	11.9 ▲	11.4 ▲	12.8 ▲	12.4 ▼	12.5 ▲	12.3 ▼
Kherson Oblast	11.5 ▲	11.4 ▼	11.7 ▲	11.1 ▼	15.1 ▲	14.9 ▲	14.7 ▲	14.6 ▼
Mykolaiv Oblast	11.2 ▲	11.1 ▼	11.5 ▲	11.0 ▲	15.2 ▲	14.8 ▲	14.7 ▼	14.8 ▼
Khmelnytskyi Oblast	11.2 ▲	11.1 ▼	11.3 ▲	11.0 ▲	15.6 ▼	15.7 ▲	15.5 ▲	15.2 ▼
Dnipropetrovsk Oblast	11.1 ▲	11.0 ▼	11.2 ▲	10.9 ▲	16.0 ▲	15.5	15.5 ▼	15.7 ▼
Vinnytsia Oblast	10.9 ▲	10.8 ▼	11.2 ▲	10.9 ▲	15.9 ▲	15.7 ▲	15.4 ▼	15.5 ▼
Ternopil Oblast	10.9 ▼	11.0 ▼	11.3 ▲	11.1 ▲	14.2 ▲	13.7 ▼	13.8 ▲	13.7 ▼
Kirovohrad Oblast	10.8 ▲	10.7 ▼	11.0 ▲	10.5 ▲	17.0 ▲	16.7 ▲	16.5 ▼	16.6 ▼
Zaporizhzhia Oblast	10.6 ▲	10.2 ▼	10.6 ▲	10.1 ▲	15.7 ▲	14.9 ▲	14.8 ▼	15.0 ▼
Kharkiv Oblast	10.1 ▲	9.8 ▼	9.9 ▲	9.6 ▲	15.3 ▲	14.4 ▼	14.6	14.6 ▼
Poltava Oblast	10.0 ▲	9.8 ▼	9.9 ▲	9.5	17.1 ▲	16.7 ▲	16.5 ▲	16.4 ▼
Cherkasy Oblast	9.8 ▲	9.6 ▼	10.1 ▲	9.8 ▲	16.5 ▲	16.2	16.2 ▼	16.3 ▼
Sumy Oblast	9.2	9.2 ▼	9.7 ▲	9.1 ▲	17.2 ▲	16.9 ▲	16.6 ▲	16.3 ▼
Chernihiv Oblast	9.0 ▼	9.2 ▼	9.4 ▲	9.3 ▲	19.2 ▲	18.6 ▼	18.7 ▲	18.5 ▼
Donetsk Oblast	8.2 ▼	9.4 ▼	9.8 ▲	9.5 ▲	16.6 ▲	15.9 ▼	16.1	16.1 ▼
Luhansk Oblast	5.1 ▼	9.1 ▼	9.6 ▲	9.3 ▲	10.2 ▼	15.9 ▼	16.0 ▼	16.3 ▼

=== Year in review 2013 ===
Compared to 2012, the amount of attrition increased in 2013 by 16,278 persons, or 3.1 to 3.5 persons per 1,000 inhabitants (real). Natural decreases were observed in 23 oblasts of the country, while natural increases were recorded only in Kyiv and in the Zakarpattia Oblast, Rivne and Volyn oblasts (5,302, 3,689, 2,889 and 1,034 people, respectively).

Some regions registered a low natural decline, such as Chernivtsi, Ivano-Frankivsk, Sevastopol, Lviv, Ternopil, Crimea, Kherson and Odesa (−55, −642, −863, −2,124, −2,875, −2,974, −3,748 and −4,448 people, respectively). The largest declines were recorded in Donetsk, Luhansk, Dnipro, Kharkiv, Poltava and Chernihiv (−28,311, −15,291, −15,007, −12,765, −10,062 and −10,057, respectively), regions which share a low birth rate and high mortality of a large urban population and rapid aging of the rural population.

=== Net migration rate ===
−5.4 migrant(s)/1,000 population (2015).

=== Infant mortality rate ===
- 9.1 ▼ deaths/1,000 infants live births for 4,564 deaths (2010)
- 9.0 ▼ deaths/1,000 infants live births for 4,511 deaths (2011)
- 8.4 ▼ deaths/1,000 infants live births for 4,371 deaths (2012)
- 8.0 ▼ deaths/1,000 infants live births for 4,030 deaths (2013)
- 8.9 ▲ deaths/1,000 live births for 2,193 deaths for January–June 2011
- 8.6 ▼ deaths/1,000 live births for 2,190 deaths for January–June 2012
- 7.8 ▼ deaths/1,000 infants live births for 1,993 deaths for January–June 2013

Infant mortality by oblast	Death/2012	Death/2011	Death/2010	Death/2009
Donetsk Oblast	540 ▲	473 ▼	497 ▼	533
Dnipropetrovsk Oblast	370 ▲	343 ▼	347 ▲	329 ▼
Odesa Oblast	267 ▼	268 ▲	263 ▼	280 ▼
Kyiv City	262 ▲	255 ▲	233 ▼	244 ▼
Lviv Oblast	233 ▼	272 ▲	266 ▲	238 ▼
Kharkiv Oblast	203 ▼	234 ▼	243 ▼	252 ▼
Zakarpattia Oblast	168 ▼	195 ▼	199 ▼	238 ▲
Vinnytsia Oblast	166 ▼	186 ▲	148 ▼	149 ▼
Luhansk Oblast	165 ▼	188 ▼	199 ▼	252 ▼
Zaporizhzhia Oblast	154 ▼	169 ▼	182 ▲	174 ▼
Rivne Oblast	147 ▼	156 ▼	158 ▼	164 ▲
Khmelnytskyi Oblast	134 ▲	89 ▼	109 ▼	174 ▲
Zhytomyr Oblast	124 ▼	134 ▼	135 ▲	127 ▲
Cherkasy Oblast	122 ▲	101 ▼	125 ▼	132 ▼
Kyiv Oblast	119 ▼	143 ▲	140 ▼	146 ▲
Ivano-Frankivsk Oblast	109 ▼	145 ▼	170 ▲	157 ▼
Volyn Oblast	106 ▼	116 ▼	123 ▲	118 ▲
Kirovohrad Oblast	103 ▼	139 ▲	112 ▼	119 ▼
Kherson Oblast	100 ▼	120 ▲	116 ▼	136 ▼
Mykolaiv Oblast	97	97 ▼	104 ▼	112 ▲
Ternopil Oblast	97 ▲	96 ▼	98 ▲	93 ▼
Chernihiv Oblast	94 ▲	80 ▼	82 ▼	103 ▲
Chernivtsi Oblast	92 ▼	96 ▲	90 ▼	91 ▼
Poltava Oblast	85 ▼	86 ▼	87 ▼	105 ▼
Sumy Oblast	76 ▼	78 ▼	97 ▲	91 ▼

Infant mortality per 1,000 by oblast	Death/2012	Death/2011	Death/2010	Death/2009
Donetsk Oblast	12.7 ▲	11.4 ▼	12.0 ▼	12.3 ▲
Dnipropetrovsk Oblast	10.0 ▲	9.5 ▼	9.7 ▲	8.8 ▼
Cherkasy Oblast	9.6 ▲	8.1 ▼	10.0 ▼	10.5 ▼
Kirovohrad Oblast	9.4 ▼	13.2 ▲	10.6 ▼	10.9 ▼
Chernihiv Oblast	9.2 ▲	7.9 ▼	8.1 ▼	9.9 ▲
Vinnytsia Oblast	9.1 ▼	10.4 ▲	8.4 ▼	8.3 ▼
Khmelnytskyi Oblast	9.0 ▲	6.2 ▼	7.5 ▼	11.8 ▲
Zakarpattia Oblast	8.9 ▼	10.6 ▼	10.9 ▼	13.1 ▲
Odesa Oblast	8.8 ▼	9.2	9.2 ▼	9.7 ▼
Zaporizhzhia Oblast	8.2 ▼	9.3 ▼	10.1 ▲	9.4 ▼
Rivne Oblast	8.1 ▼	8.9 ▼	9.2 ▼	9.4 ▲
Kherson Oblast	8.0 ▼	9.9 ▲	9.4 ▼	11.0 ▼
Zhytomyr Oblast	8.0 ▼	8.9 ▼	9.1 ▲	8.5 ▲
Chernivtsi Oblast	8.0 ▼	8.5 ▲	8.2	8.2 ▼
Ternopil Oblast	8.0	8.0 ▼	8.2 ▲	7.5 ▼
Lviv Oblast	7.8 ▼	9.4 ▲	9.2 ▼	8.0 ▼
Kyiv City	7.8 ▼	8.0 ▲	7.3 ▼	7.5 ▼
Luhansk Oblast	7.6 ▼	8.8 ▼	9.4 ▼	11.6 ▼
Kharkiv Oblast	7.5 ▼	8.9 ▼	9.2 ▼	9.3 ▼
Mykolaiv Oblast	7.3 ▼	7.5 ▼	8.1 ▼	8.5 ▲
Volyn Oblast	7.0 ▼	7.9 ▼	8.2 ▲	7.7 ▲
Sumy Oblast	6.9 ▼	7.5 ▼	9.3 ▲	8.5 ▼
Ivano-Frankivsk Oblast	6.4 ▼	8.8 ▲	10.3 ▲	9.1 ▼
Poltava Oblast	5.8 ▼	6.1	6.1 ▼	7.1 ▼
Kyiv Oblast	5.7 ▼	7.2 ▲	7.0 ▼	7.1 ▼

=== Total fertility rate by oblast ===
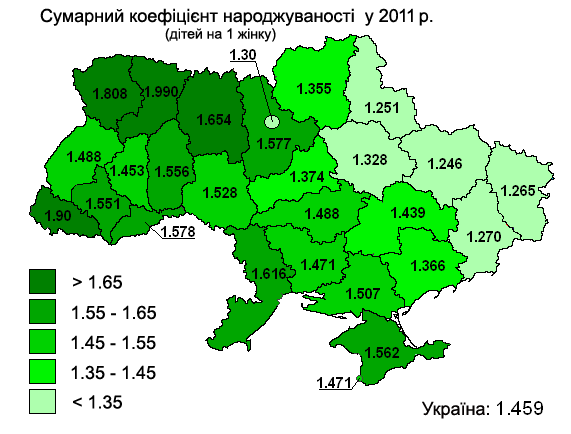
Fertility rate in Ukraine by oblast in 2011

None of the oblasts in 2013 recorded a higher fertility rate than 2.10 children per woman, though rural areas saw higher rates in the Rivne Oblast (2.50) and Volyn Oblast (2.20). While close-to-generational renewal rates were achieved in the Odesa (2.04), Zakarpattia (2.00), Mykolaiv (1.95), Chernivtsi (1.93) and Zhytomyr (1.91) oblasts, they were weaker in the Luhansk (1.41), Sumy (1.47) and Cherkasy (1.53) oblasts.

The highest urban fertility rates were recorded in the Zakarpattia Oblast (1.80), city of Sevastopol (1.57), Volyn Oblast (1.56), Kyiv Oblast (1.56) and Rivne Oblast (1.54). The lowest were in the Sumy (1.23), Kharkiv (1.26), Cherkasy (1.28), Chernihiv (1.28), Chernivtsi (1.28), Luhansk (1.28), Poltava (1.29), Donetsk (1.29) and Zaporizhzhia (1.32) oblasts.

Children born per woman by oblast	Total fertility rate/2020	Total fertility rate/2012	Total fertility rate/2011	Total fertility rate/2010
Rivne Oblast	1.54 ▼	2.08 ▲	1.99 ▲	1.93 ▲
Zakarpattia Oblast	1.60 ▼	1.95 ▲	1.90 ▲	1.83
Volyn Oblast	1.51 ▼	1.92 ▲	1.81 ▼	1.85 ▼
Zhytomyr Oblast	1.20 ▼	1.71 ▲	1.65 ▲	1.61 ▲
Odesa Oblast	1.34 ▼	1.71 ▲	1.62 ▲	1.58
Kyiv Oblast	1.18 ▼	1.67 ▲	1.58	1.58 ▼
Chernivtsi Oblast	1.30 ▼	1.64 ▲	1.58 ▲	1.53
Khmelnytskyi Oblast	1.26 ▼	1.62 ▲	1.56 ▲	1.55 ▼
Ivano-Frankivsk Oblast	1.27 ▼	1.63 ▲	1.55 ▼	1.58 ▼
Kherson Oblast	1.20 ▼	1.61 ▲	1.51	1.51 ▲
Kirovohrad Oblast	1.10 ▼	1.61 ▲	1.51 ▲	1.50 ▲
Lviv Oblast	1.24 ▼	1.58 ▲	1.49 ▼	1.50 ▼
Mykolaiv Oblast	1.11 ▼	1.57 ▲	1.47 ▲	1.44 ▼
Vinnytsia Oblast	1.20 ▼	1.59 ▲	1.53 ▲	1.50 ▼
Ukraine	1.22 ▼	1.53 ▲	1.46 ▲	1.45 ▼
Dnipropetrovsk Oblast	1.09 ▼	1.52 ▲	1.44 ▲	1.43 ▼
Ternopil Oblast	1.13 ▼	1.50 ▲	1.45 ▼	1.46 ▼
Zaporizhzhia Oblast	1.03 ▼	1.46 ▲	1.37 ▲	1.34 ▼
Poltava Oblast	1.04 ▼	1.41 ▲	1.33 ▼	1.34 ▲
Cherkasy Oblast	1.01 ▼	1.43 ▲	1.37 ▲	1.36 ▲
Chernihiv Oblast	1.02 ▼	1.40 ▲	1.36	1.36 ▲
Kyiv City	1.44 ▼	1.38 ▲	1.29 ▼	1.30
Donetsk Oblast		1.34 ▲	1.27 ▲	1.26 ▼
Kharkiv Oblast	0.98	1.32 ▲	1.25 ▲	1.24 ▼
Sumy Oblast	0.93 ▼	1.36 ▲	1.25 ▲	1.23 ▼
Luhansk Oblast		1.33 ▲	1.27 ▲	1.23 ▼

== Other demographics statistics ==
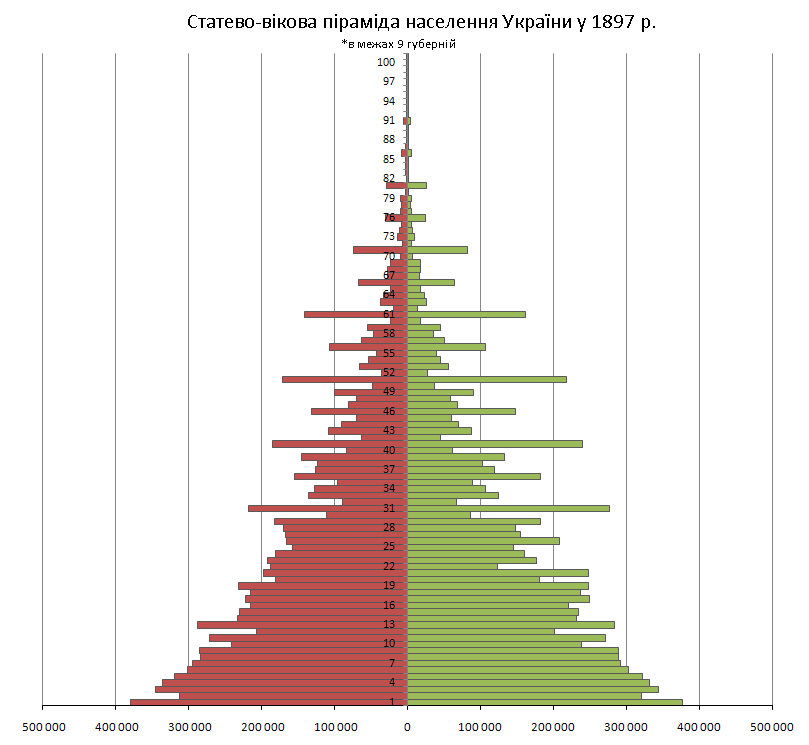
Population pyramid of Ukraine in 1897

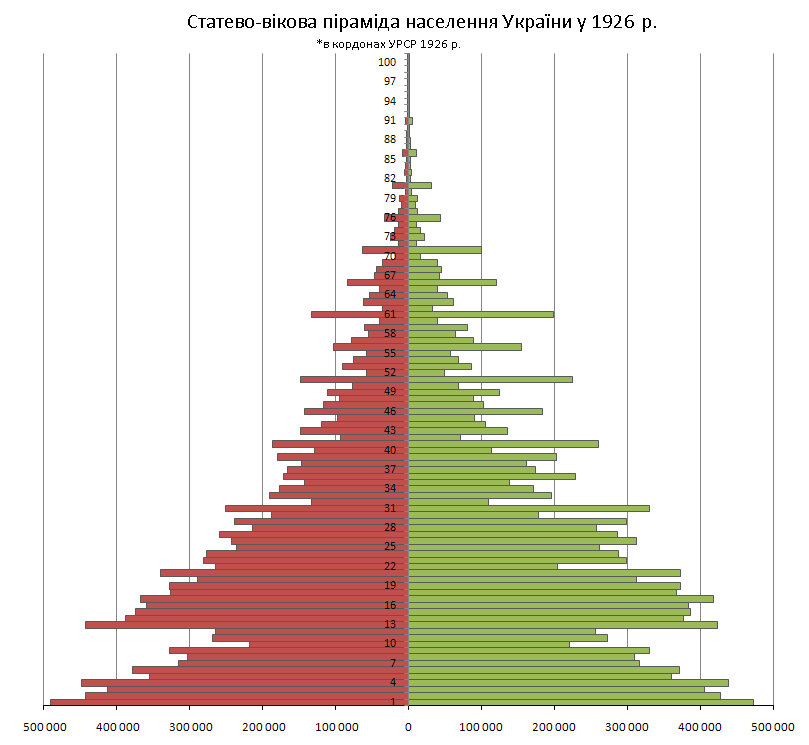
Population pyramid of Ukraine in 1926

Population pyramid of Ukraine in 2017

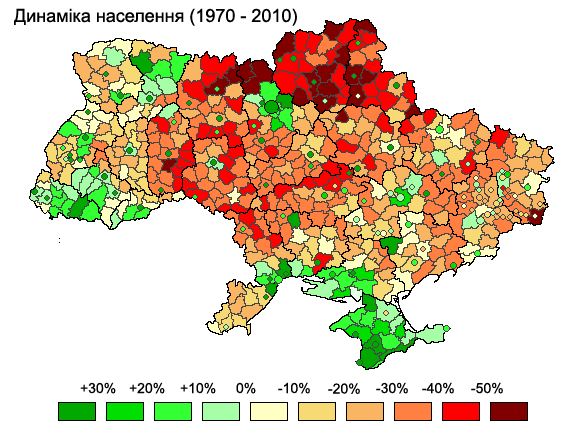
Population change, 1970–2010

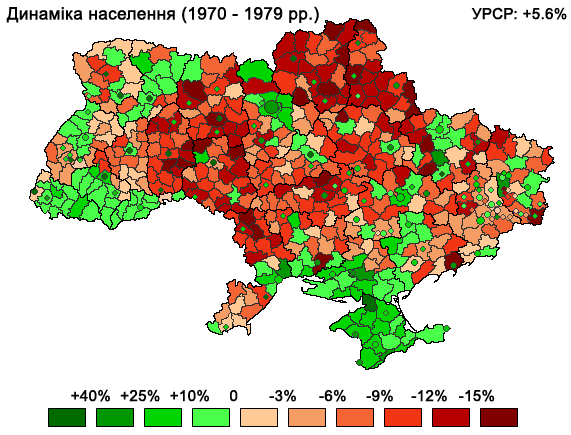
Population change, 1970–1979

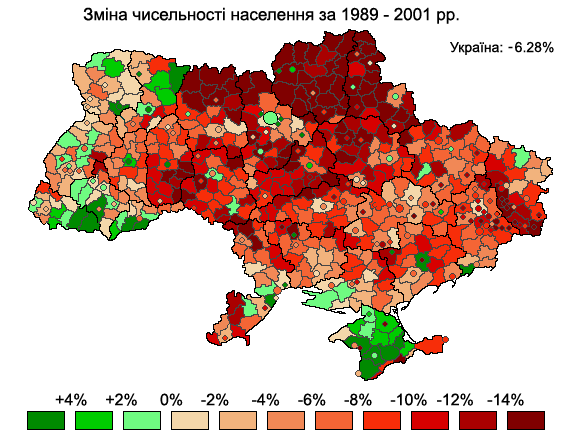
Population change, 1989–2001

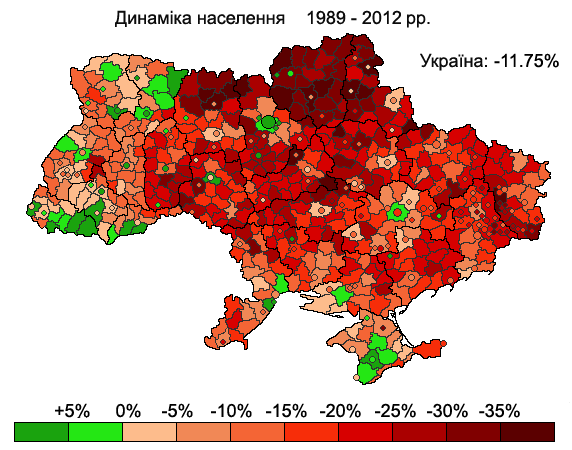
Population change, 1989–2012

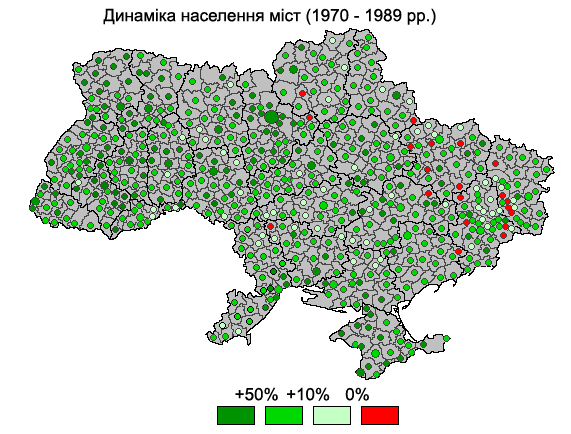
Population change of urban settlements, 1970–1989

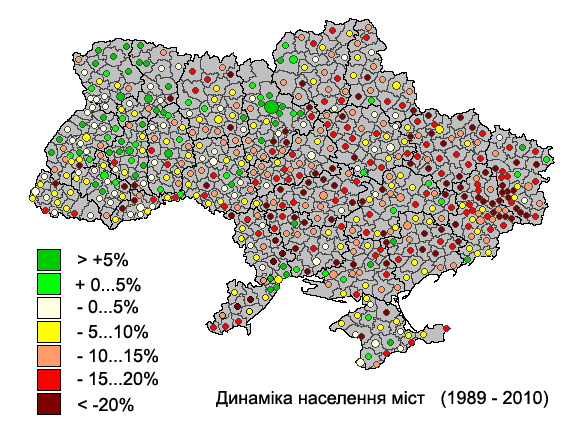
Population change of urban settlements, 1989–2010

Demographic statistics according to the CIA World Factbook, unless otherwise indicated

Age structure:
0–14 years: 15.95% (male 3,609,386/female 3,400,349)
15–24 years: 9.57% (male 2,156,338/female 2,047,821)
25–54 years: 44.03% (male 9,522,108/female 9,831,924)
55–64 years: 13.96% (male 2,638,173/female 3,499,718)
65 years and over: 16.49% (male 2,433,718/female 4,812,764) (2018 est.)

0–14 years: 15.76% (male 3,571,358/female 3,366,380)
15–24 years: 9.86% (male 2,226,142/female 2,114,853)
25–54 years: 44.29% (male 9,579,149/female 9,921,387)
55–64 years: 13.8% (male 2,605,849/female 3,469,246)
65 years and over: 16.3% (male 2,409,049/female 4,770,461) (2017 est.)

0–14 years: 15.1% = 6,449,171 (2015 official)
15–64 years: 69.3% = 29,634,710
65 years and over: 15.6% = 6,675,780

0–14 years: 14.8% = 6,989,802
15–64 years: 69.2% = 32,603,475
65 years and over: 16.0% = 7,507,185 (2005 official)

0–14 years: 21.6% = 11,101,469
15–64 years: 66.7% = 34,320,742
65 years and over: 11.7% = 6,022,934 (1989 official)

Median age
total: 40.8 years. Country comparison to the world: 47th
male: 37.7 years
female: 43.9 years (2018 est.)

total: 40.6 years
male: 37.4 years
female: 43.7 years (2017 est.)

total: 39.8 years
male: 39.7 years
female: 40.1 years (2014 official)
total: 39.7 years
male: 39.5 years
female: 40.1 years (2013 official)
total: 34.8 years
male: 31.9 years
female: 37.7 years (1989 official)

Birth rate
10.1 births/1,000 population (2018 est.) Country comparison to the world: 190th
10.3 births/1,000 population (2017 est.)

Death rate
14.3 deaths/1,000 population (2018 est.) Country comparison to the world: 6th
14.4 deaths/1,000 population (2017 est.)

Total fertility rate
1.55 children born/woman (2018 est.) Country comparison to the world: 190th
1.54 children born/woman (2017 est.)

Net migration rate
4.6 migrant(s)/1,000 population (2018 est.) Country comparison to the world: 29th
0 migrant(s)/1,000 population (2017 est.)

Mother's mean age at first birth
Out of 129 countries with data, Ukraine's mean age of mother at the first birth is ranked as 51st highest.

Age (est.)	Year
26.2	2025
26.2	2024
26.2	2023
26.2	2022
26.2	2021
25.6	2020
24.9	2019
24.9	2018
24.9	2017
25	2016
25.8	2014
23.1	2013

Population growth rate
0.04% (2018 est.) Country comparison to the world: 187th
−0.41% (2017 est.)

Life expectancy at birth
total population: 72.4 years. Country comparison to the world: 148th
male: 67.7 years
female: 77.4 years (2018 est.)

Ethnic groups

Ukrainian 77.8%, Russian 17.3%, Belarusian 0.6%, Moldovan 0.5%, Crimean Tatar 0.5%, Bulgarian 0.4%, Hungarian 0.3%, Romanian 0.3%, Polish 0.3%, Jewish 0.2%, other 1.8% (2001 est.)

Languages

Ukrainian (official) 67.5%, Russian (regional language) 29.6%, other (includes small Crimean Tatar-, Moldovan/Romanian-, and Hungarian-speaking minorities) 2.9% (2001 est.)
Note: in February 2018, the Constitutional Court ruled that 2012 language legislation entitling a language spoken by at least 10% of an oblast's population to be given the status of "regional language" – allowing for its use in courts, schools, and other government institutions – was unconstitutional, thus making the law invalid; Ukrainian remains the country's only official nationwide language.

Religions

Orthodox (includes Ukrainian Autocephalous Orthodox (UAOC), Ukrainian Orthodox – Kyiv Patriarchate (UOC-KP), Ukrainian Orthodox – Moscow Patriarchate (UOC-MP)), Ukrainian Greek Catholic, Roman Catholic, Protestant, Muslim, Jewish
Note: Ukraine's population is overwhelmingly Christian; the vast majority – up to two-thirds – identify themselves as Orthodox, but many do not specify a particular branch; the UOC-KP and the UOC-MP each represent less than a quarter of the country's population, the Ukrainian Greek Catholic Church accounts for 8–10%, and the UAOC accounts for 1–2%; Muslim and Jewish adherents each compose less than 1% of the total population (2013 est.).

Dependency ratios
total dependency ratio: 44.8 (2015 est.)
youth dependency ratio: 21.8 (2015 est.)
elderly dependency ratio: 23 (2015 est.)
potential support ratio: 4.3 (2015 est.)
Note: data include Crimea

Urbanization
urban population: 69.4% of total population (2018)
rate of urbanization: −0.33% annual rate of change (2015–20 est.)

Literacy

definition: age 15 and over can read and write (2015 est.)

total population: 99.8%
male: 99.8%
female: 99.7% (2015 est.)

School life expectancy (primary to tertiary education)
total: 15 years
male: 15 years
female: 16 years (2014)

Unemployment, youth ages 15–24
total: 23%. Country comparison to the world: 53rd
male: 24%
female: 21.5% (2016 est.)

== Birth and death rates of regional capitals ==
Birth rate in regional centers	Birth/2012	Birth/2011	Birth/2010	Birth/2009	Birth/2007	Birth/2005	Birth/2003
Simferopol	13.6 ▲	12.8 ▲	11.8	11.8 ▲	11.0 ▲	9.5 ▲	9.2 ▲
Lutsk	12.6 ▲	12.3 ▼	12.6 ▼	13.9 ▲	12.6 ▲	11.7 ▲	10.0 ▲
Rivne	12.6 ▲	12.0 ▲	11.8 ▼	12.3 ▲	10.9 ▲	10.1 ▼	9.4 ▲
Uzhhorod	12.1 ▲	11.9 ▼	12.0 ▼	12.4 ▲	12.8 ▲	12.6 ▲	10.8 ▼
Kyiv	12.0 ▲	11.4 ▼	11.5 ▼	11.7 ▲	10.4 ▲	9.8 ▲	8.8 ▲
Khmelnytskyi	12.0 ▲	11.2 ▼	11.8 ▲	11.5 ▲	10.4	10.2 ▲	9.2 ▲
Sevastopol	12.0 ▲	11.1 ▲	11.0 ▼	11.2 ▲	10.5 ▲	9.6 ▲	8.7 ▲
Kherson	11.9 ▲	11.1 ▲	10.1 ▲	10.5 ▲	9.6	8.6 ▼	8.5 ▲
Ternopil	11.8 ▼	12.2 ▲	11.7 ▼	12.3 ▲	11.9 ▲	11.6 ▲	10.4 ▲
Ivano-Frankivsk	11.6	11.6 ▲	10.1 ▼	10.8 ▼	11.3 ▲	10.7 ▲	9.3 ▲
Vinnytsia	11.5 ▲	11.2 ▲	10.9 ▼	11.1 ▲	10.1 ▲	9.4 ▲	9.1 ▲
Kropyvnytskyi	11.5 ▲	11.1 ▲	10.5 ▼	11.3 ▼	10.5 ▲	8.9 ▲	8.4 ▼
Zhytomyr	11.4 ▼	11.5 ▲	10.8 ▼	11.7 ▲	10.6 ▲	9.5 ▲	8.7 ▲
Sumy	11.3 ▲	10.3 ▲	10.0 ▼	10.3 ▼	9.6 ▲	8.2 ▲	7.8 ▲
Lviv	11.0 ▲	10.4 ▲	10.0 ▼	10.5 ▲	9.7 ▲	9.3 ▼	9.0 ▲
Ukraine Urban	10.9 ▲	10.5 ▲	10.4 ▼	10.8	9.9 ▲	8.9	8.3 ▲
Dnipro	10.5 ▲	10.2 ▲	10.0 ▼	10.5	9.4 ▲	8.5 ▲	7.9 ▲
Luhansk	10.5 ▲	9.8 ▲	8.8 ▼	9.2 ▼	8.2 ▲	7.4 ▼	6.8 ▲
Chernivtsi	10.2 ▼	10.3 ▲	10.1 ▼	10.2 ▼	9.2 ▲	9.6 ▲	8.3 ▲
Odesa	10.1 ▲	9.8 ▲	9.6 ▼	9.9 ▼	9.0 ▲	8.3 ▲	7.5 ▼
Cherkasy	9.9 ▲	9.4	9.4	9.4 ▼	8.7 ▲	7.8	7.4 ▼
Poltava	9.9 ▲	9.1 ▲	8.8 ▼	9.7 ▼	8.4 ▲	7.8 ▲	7.3 ▲
Zaporizhzhia	9.5 ▲	9.2	9.2 ▼	9.3 ▼	8.9 ▲	8.2 ▲	7.5 ▼
Mykolaiv	9.4 ▲	9.3 ▲	9.1 ▼	9.4 ▼	8.7 ▲	8.0 ▼	7.9 ▲
Chernihiv	9.3 ▲	9.2 ▲	9.1 ▼	9.6	8.4 ▲	8.0 ▲	7.6 ▲
Kharkiv	9.2 ▲	8.9 ▲	8.8 ▼	9.2 ▼	8.4 ▲	7.6 ▲	7.1 ▲
Donetsk	9.1 ▲	8.7 ▲	8.6 ▼	9.0 ▼	8.2 ▲	7.5 ▲	6.6 ▲

Death rate in regional centers	Death/2012	Death/2011	Death/2010	Death/2009	Death/2007	Death/2005	Death/2003
Kherson	15.2 ▼	15.6 ▲	14.0 ▼	14.2 ▼	14.9 ▼	14.8 ▼	14.5 ▼
Luhansk	14.2 ▼	14.3 ▲	13.6 ▲	13.4 ▼	13.8 ▼	14.2 ▼	14.1 ▲
Simferopol	14.0 ▼	14.8 ▲	13.6 ▼	13.8 ▼	15.3	15.3 ▲	15.2 ▼
Sevastopol	13.7 ▼	14.1 ▼	14.7 ▲	14.5 ▼	15.5 ▲	15.4 ▲	14.1 ▲
Kropyvnytskyi	13.7	13.7 ▼	13.8 ▼	14.0 ▼	14.4 ▲	14.1	14.1 ▲
Dnipro	13.5 ▼	13.7 ▼	14.1 ▲	13.8 ▼	15.1	15.1 ▼	16.0 ▼
Donetsk	13.4 ▼	13.5 ▼	14.0 ▲	13.9 ▼	15.2 ▼	15.4 ▲	14.7 ▲
Zaporizhzhia	13.2 ▼	13.4 ▼	14.2 ▲	13.8 ▼	15.0 ▲	14.7 ▲	14.2 ▼
Ukraine Urban	13.1	13.1 ▼	13.7	13.7 ▼	14.7 ▲	14.8 ▲	14.3 ▲
Mykolaiv	12.8	12.8 ▼	13.8	13.8 ▼	14.5	14.5 ▼	14.9 ▲
Poltava	12.8 ▲	12.6 ▼	13.2 ▲	13.0 ▼	13.7 ▲	13.6	13.6 ▲
Sumy	12.1 ▲	11.9 ▼	12.4 ▼	12.6 ▼	13.0 ▼	13.1 ▲	11.9 ▼
Kharkiv	12.0 ▲	11.8 ▼	12.4 ▲	12.2 ▼	13.1	13.1 ▲	13.0 ▼
Odesa	11.9 ▼	12.2 ▼	13.0 ▲	12.5 ▼	13.9 ▲	14.1 ▼	14.0 ▼
Cherkasy	11.2 ▲	10.7 ▼	11.3 ▲	11.2 ▼	11.7	11.7 ▲	11.0 ▼
Chernihiv	11.4 ▲	11.1 ▼	12.0 ▲	11.8 ▼	12.5 ▼	12.4 ▲	12.0 ▼
Lviv	11.0 ▲	10.8 ▲	10.5 ▼	10.8 ▼	11.5 ▲	11.4 ▼	11.5 ▲
Zhytomyr	10.7 ▼	10.9 ▼	11.2 ▲	11.1 ▼	12.0 ▼	12.2 ▲	11.4 ▲
Uzhhorod	10.3 ▲	10.2 ▼	10.5 ▼	11.3 ▼	12.0 ▼	12.4 ▲	10.3 ▲
Kyiv	9.8 ▲	9.6 ▼	10.3 ▲	10.2 ▼	11.4 ▲	11.2 ▲	10.7 ▲
Lutsk	9.6 ▲	9.4 ▼	9.6 ▲	9.1 ▼	10.4 ▲	10.2 ▼	10.5 ▲
Chernivtsi	9.5 ▲	9.4 ▼	9.9 ▼	10.3 ▼	11.0	11.0 ▲	10.8 ▲
Khmelnytskyi	9.4 ▲	8.8 ▼	9.0 ▼	9.5 ▲	9.8	9.8 ▲	9.2 ▲
Vinnytsia	9.1 ▲	9.0 ▼	9.2	9.2 ▼	10.2	10.2 ▲	10.0 ▲
Ivano-Frankivsk	9.1 ▲	8.7 ▲	8.2 ▼	8.5 ▼	9.1 ▼	9.3	9.3 ▲
Ternopil	8.1 ▲	7.6 ▼	8.1 ▲	7.7 ▼	8.5	8.5 ▲	7.7 ▼
Rivne	7.9 ▲	7.8 ▼	8.7 ▲	8.6 ▼	9.0 ▲	9.2 ▲	8.8 ▼

== Ethnic groups ==
National population structure of Ukraine in 2001 Ukrainians Russians Others

In 2001, the ethnic composition of Ukraine was: Ukrainian 77.8%, Russian 17.3%, Romanian 1.1% (including Moldovan 0.8%), Belarusian 0.6%, Crimean Tatar 0.5%, Bulgarian 0.4%, Hungarian 0.3%, Polish 0.3%, Jewish 1.0%, Pontic Greek 0.2% and other 1.6% (including Armenians, Germans, Romas, Georgians, Slovaks, Albanians, Crimean Karaites, as well as Muslim Bulgarians, otherwise known as Torbesh, and a microcosm of Swedes of Gammalsvenskby). According to the 2001 census, there were 12,711 ethnic Koreans (0.03%) in Ukraine that belong to the Koryo-saram group, though community estimates suggest the actual population may number between 30,000 and 40,000. Rusyns are also not recognised by the Ukrainian government as a distinct ethnic group and are instead treated as a sub-group of Ukrainians.

According to the 2021 law “On the Indigenous Peoples of Ukraine”, the Crimean Tatars, Crimean Karaites and Krymchaks are the indigenous peoples of Ukraine.

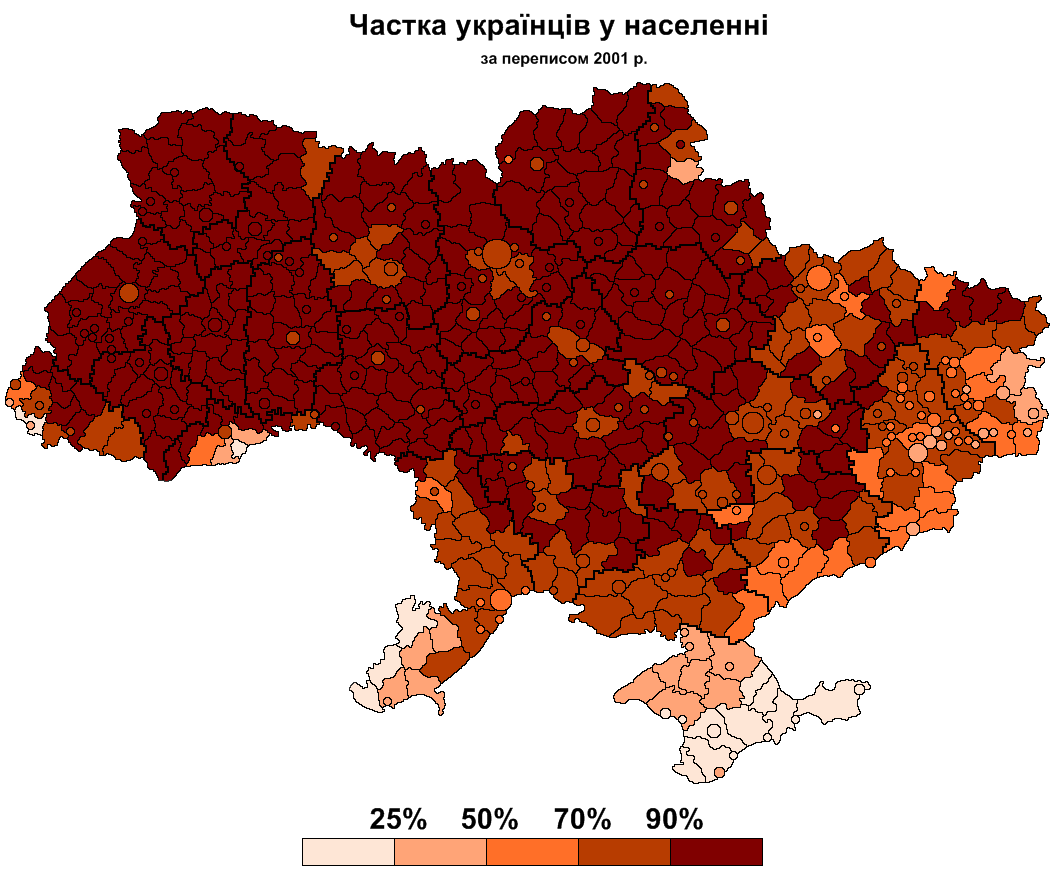
Ethnic Ukrainians in Ukraine by raions (2001 census)

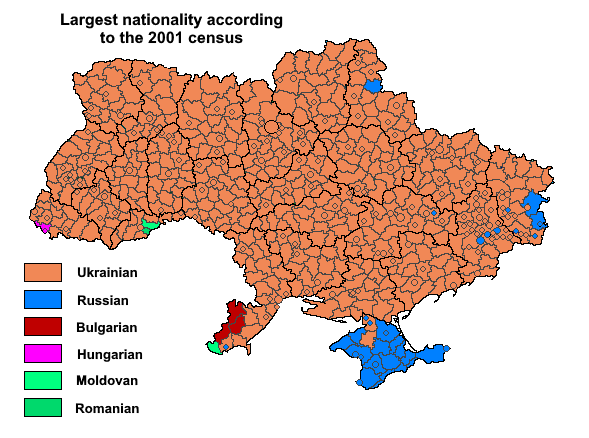
Largest ethnicity in Ukraine's cities and raions, according to 2001 census.

=== Before World War II ===
Population of the Ukrainian SSR according to ethnic group 1926–1939
Ethnic group	census 1926^{1}		census 1939^{2}	
Ethnic group	Number	%	Number	%
Ukrainians	23,218,860	80.0	23,667,509	76.5
Russians	2,677,166	9.2	4,175,299	13.5
Jewish	1,574,428	5.4	1,532,776	5.0
Germans	393,924	1.4	392,458	1.3
Polish	476,435	1.6	357,710	1.2
Moldavians / Romanians	257,794	0.9	230,698	0.8
Belarusians	75,842	0.3	158,174	0.5
Pontic Greeks	104,666	0.4	107,047	0.4
Bulgarians	99,278	0.3	83,838	0.3
Tatars	22,281	0.1	55,456	0.2
Roma	13,578	0.0	10,443	0.0
Others	103,935	0.4	174,810	0.6
Total	29,018,187		30,946,218	
^{1} Source:.

=== After World War II ===
Population of Ukraine according to ethnic group 1959–2001
Ethnic group	census 1959^{1}		census 1970^{2}		census 1979^{3}		census 1989^{4}		census 2001^{5}	
Ethnic group	Number	%	Number	%	Number	%	Number	%	Number	%
Ukrainians	32,158,493	76.8	35,283,857	74.9	36,488,951	73.6	37,419,053	72.7	37,541,693	77.5
Russians	7,090,813	16.9	9,126,331	19.4	10,471,602	21.1	11,355,582	22.1	8,334,141	17.2
Romanians / Moldovans	391,753	1.1	378,043	1.1	415,371	1.1	459,350	1.2	409,608	1.1
Belarusians	290,890	0.7	385,847	0.8	406,098	0.8	440,045	0.9	275,763	0.6
Crimean Tatars	193	0.0	3,554	0.0	6,636	0.0	46,807	0.1	248,193	0.5
Bulgarians	219,419	0.5	234,390	0.5	238,217	0.5	233,800	0.5	204,574	0.4
Hungarians	149,229	0.4	157,731	0.3	164,373	0.3	163,111	0.3	156,566	0.3
Poles	363,297	0.9	295,107	0.6	258,309	0.5	219,179	0.4	144,130	0.3
Jewish	840,311	2.0	777,126	1.7	634,154	1.3	486,628	1.0	103,591	0.2
Armenians	28,024	0.1	33,439	0.1	38,646	0.1	54,200	0.1	99,894	0.2
Greeks	104,359	0.3	106,909	0.2	104,091	0.2	98,594	0.2	91,548	0.2
Tatars	61,334	0.2	72,658	0.2	83,906	0.2	86,875	0.2	73,304	0.2
Roma	22,515	0.1	30,091	0.1	34,411	0.1	47,917	0.1	47,587	0.1
Azerbaijanis	6,680	0.0	10,769	0.0	17,235	0.0	36,961	0.1	45,176	0.1
Georgians	11,574	0.0	14,650	0.0	16,301	0.0	23,540	0.1	34,199	0.1
Germans	23,243	0.1	29,871	0.1	34,139	0.1	37,849	0.1	33,302	0.1
Gagauz	23,530	0.1	26,464	0.1	29,398	0.1	31,967	0.1	31,923	0.1
Karaites	3,301	0.0	2,596	0.0	1,845	0.0	1,404	0.0	1,196	0.0
Others	129,338	0.3	157,084	0.3	165,650	0.3	209,172	0.4	363,821	1.1
Total	41,869,046		47,126,517		49,609,333		51,452,034		48,240,902	
^{1} Source:. ^{2} Source:. ^{3} Source:. ^{4} Source:. ^{5} Source: .

Ethnic Groups in Ukraine, 2001
1. Ukrainian (77.8%)
2. Russian (17.3%)
3. Belarusian (0.60%)
4. Moldovan (0.50%)
5. Crimean Tatar (0.50%)
6. Bulgarian (0.40%)
7. Hungarian (0.30%)
8. Romanian (0.30%)
9. Polish (0.30%)
10. Jewish (0.20%)
11. Other (1.80%)

== Languages ==
During the post-WW2 period, the Russification of ethnic Ukrainians, as well as the mass immigration of ethnic Russians, significantly changed the ethnic and linguistic composition of Ukraine's population. The change was especially evident in Donbas, where Ukrainian speakers became a minority.

According to the 2001 census, the following languages are common in Ukraine: Ukrainian 67.5%, Russian 29.6%, Crimean Tatar, Urum (Turkic Greeks), Bulgarian, Moldovan/Romanian, Polish, Hungarian. The table below lists the total population of various ethnic groups in Ukraine and their native language, according to the 2001 census.

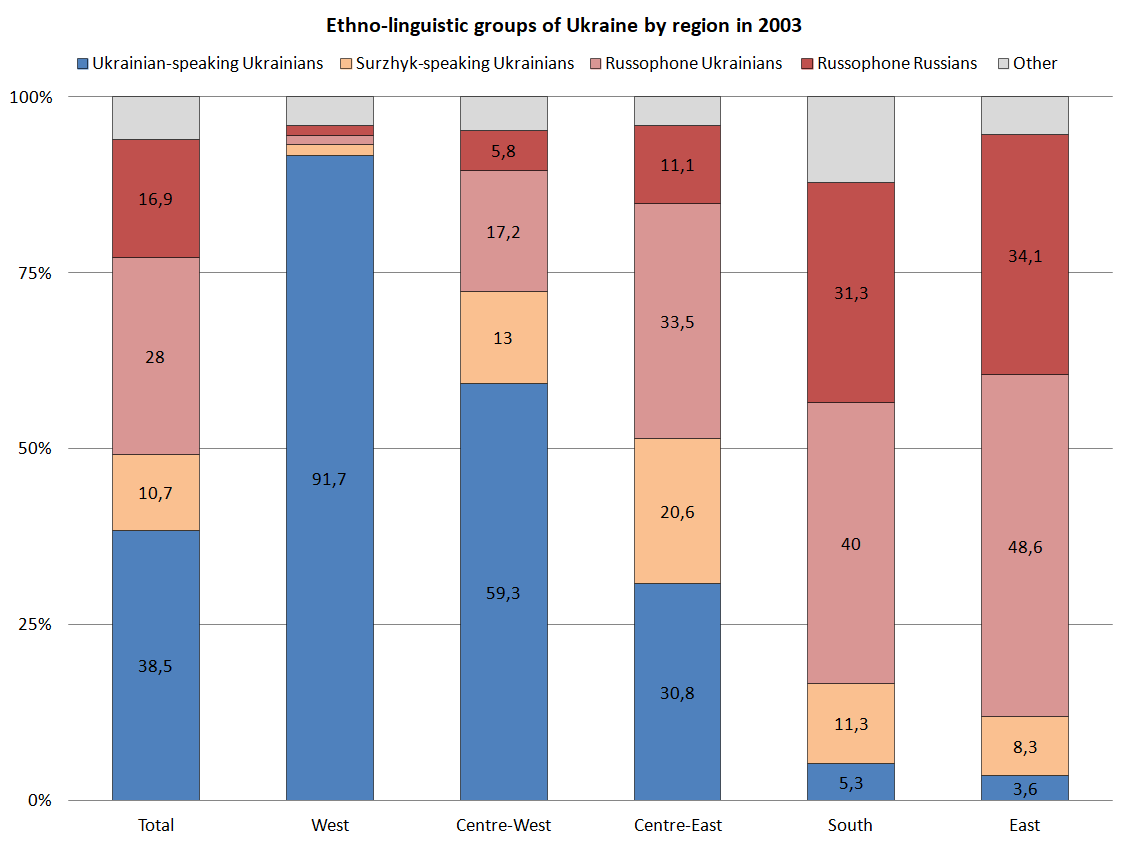
Regional distribution of people in Ukraine by ethno-linguistic group in 2003.

Primary language by ethnic group
Ethnic group	Population	Native	Ukrainian	Russian	Other
Ukrainians	37,541,693	31,970,728	–	5,544,729	532
Russians	8,334,141	7,993,832	328,152	–	402
Moldovans	258,619	181,124	27,775	45,607	1242
Belarusians	275,763	54,573	48,202	172,251	
Crimean Tatars	248,193	228,373	184	15,208	43
Bulgarians	204,574	131,237	10,277	62,067	9
Hungarians	156,566	149,431	5,367	1,513	14
Romanians	150,989	138,522	9,367	2,297	170
Polish	144,130	18,660	102,268	22,495	390
Hebrew	103,591	3,213	13,924	85,964	16
Armenians	99,894	50,363	5,798	43,105	11
Greeks	91,548	5,829	4,359	80,992	9
Tatars	73,304	25,770	3,310	43,060	6
Koreans	12,711	2,223	700	9,662	126
Roma	47,587	21,266	10,039	6,378	6
Azerbaijanis	45,176	23,958	3,224	16,968	36
Georgians	34,199	12,539	2,818	18,589	15
Germans	33,302	4,056	7,360	21,549	20
Gagauz	31,923	22,822	1,102	7,232	2
Uzbeks	12,353	3,604	1,818	5,996	0
Chuvash	10,593	2,268	564	7,636	1
Mordvinians	9,331	1,473	646	7,168	0
Turks	8,844	7,923	133	567	0
Lithuanians	7,207	1,932	1,029	4,182	4
Arabs	6,575	4,071	897	1,235	0
Slovaks	6,397	2,633	2,665	335	0
Czechs	5,917	1,190	2,503	2,144	2
Kazakhs	5,526	1,041	822	3,470	11
Latvians	5,079	957	872	3,188	1
Ossetians	4,834	1,150	401	3,110	4
Udmurts	4,712	729	380	3,515	0
Lezghinians	4,349	1,507	330	2,341	4
Tadjiks	4,255	1,521	488	1,983	0
Bashkirs	4,253	843	336	2,920	0
Mari people	4,130	1,059	264	2,758	7
Thai	3,850	3,641	29	164	0
Turkmens	3,709	719	1,079	1,392	0
Albanians	3,308	1,740	301	1,181	0
Assyrians	3,143	883	408	1,730	0
Chechens	2,877	1,581	212	977	0
Estonians	2,868	416	321	2,107	4
Chinese people	2,213	1,817	73	307	0
Kurds	2,088	1,173	236	396	0
Darghins	1,610	409	199	955	0
Komis	1,545	330	127	1,046	0
Karelians	1,522	96	145	1,244	1
Avars	1,496	582	121	761	0
Peoples of India and Pakistan	1,483	1,092	26	192	0
Abkhazians	1,458	317	268	797	0
Karaites	1,196	72	160	931	0
Komi-Permians	1,165	160	79	898	1
Kyrgyz people	1,128	208	221	617	19
Laks	1,019	199	271	514	13
Afghans	1,008	551	60	213	0
other	3,228	1,027	144	790	0
NA	188,639	0	1,108	1,844	1

Share of the rural population of Ukraine's regions that indicated Ukrainian as their native language from 1959 to 2001.

Share of the urban population of Ukraine's regions that indicated Ukrainian as their native language from 1959 to 2001.

Change in the proportion of the population of Ukraine's regions who consider Ukrainian their native language, from census to census between 1959 and 2001.

Native languages according to 2001 census
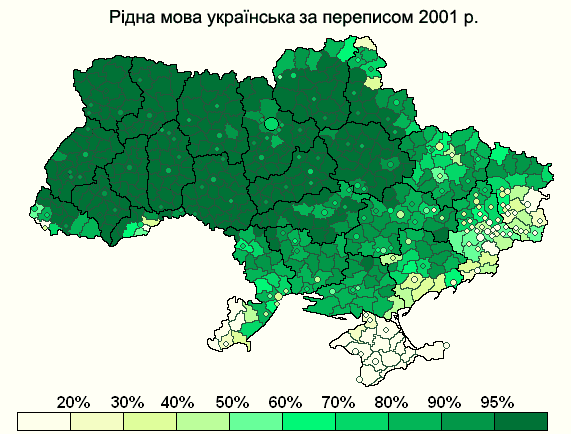
Ukrainian

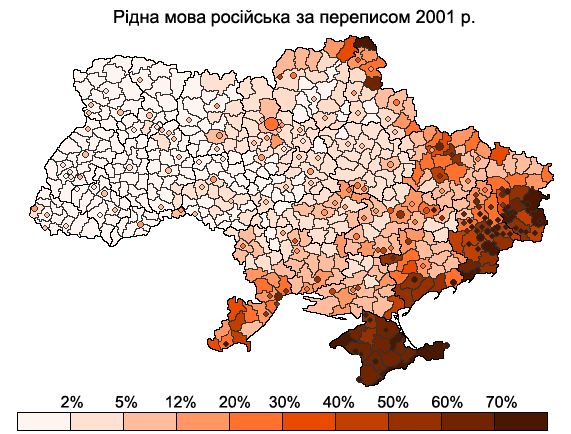
Russian

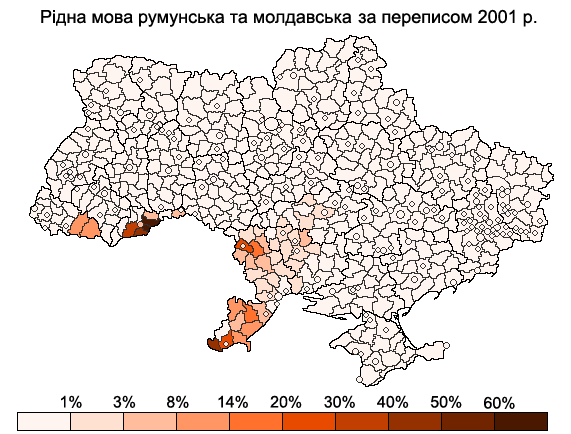
Romanian

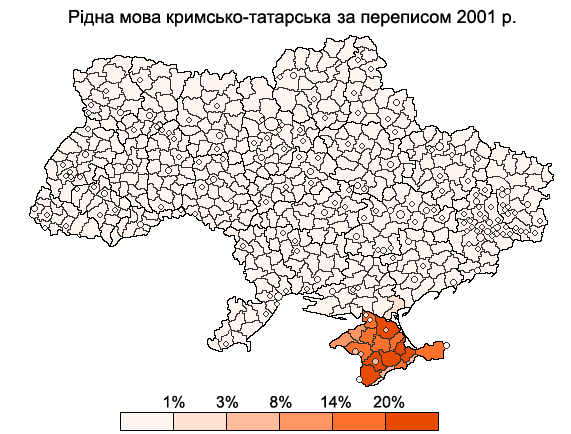
Crimean Tatar

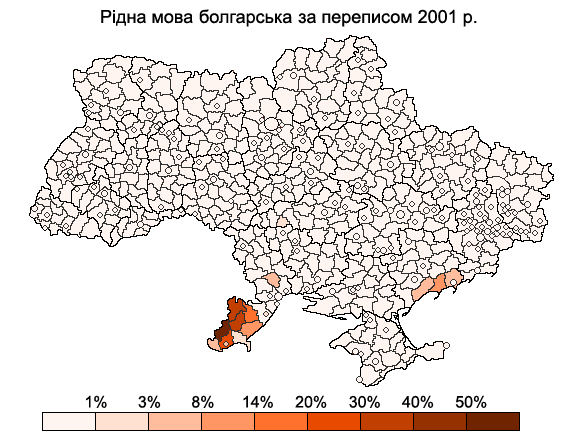
Bulgarian

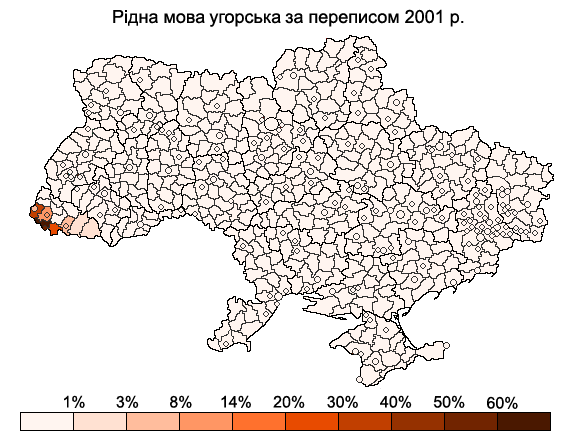
Hungarian

== Religion ==
A 2018 survey conducted by the Razumkov Centre found that 71.7% of the population declared themselves believers in any religion, while 4.7% declared themselves non-believers, and 3.0% declared themselves atheists. Of the total Ukrainian population, 87.4% declared they were Christians, comprising 67.3% who declared themselves Eastern Orthodox, 10.2% Catholics (split into 9.4% Ukrainian Greek Catholics and 0.8% Latin Catholics), 7.7% "Christians", and 2.2% Protestants. Judaism comprises 0.4% of the population. In earlier surveys, between 1 and 2% of the population stated that it adhered to Islam.

According to data from 2018, among those Ukrainians declaring themselves Orthodox Christians, 28.7% said they were members of the Ukrainian Orthodox Church of the Kyivan Patriarchate (incorporated as of 5 January 2019 into the Orthodox Church of Ukraine), while 12.8% said they were members of the Ukrainian Orthodox Church of the Moscow Patriarchate (an autonomous Eastern Orthodox church under the Russian Orthodox Church). A further 0.3% said they were members of the Ukrainian Autocephalous Orthodox Church, which, like the Kyivan Patriarchate, was incorporated in 2019 into the Orthodox Church of Ukraine. Among the remaining Orthodox Ukrainians, 23.4% declared themselves "simply Orthodox", without affiliation to any patriarchate, while a further 1.9% declared that they "did not know" which patriarchate or Orthodox church they belonged to.

== Regional differences ==
=== Regional differences in population change ===
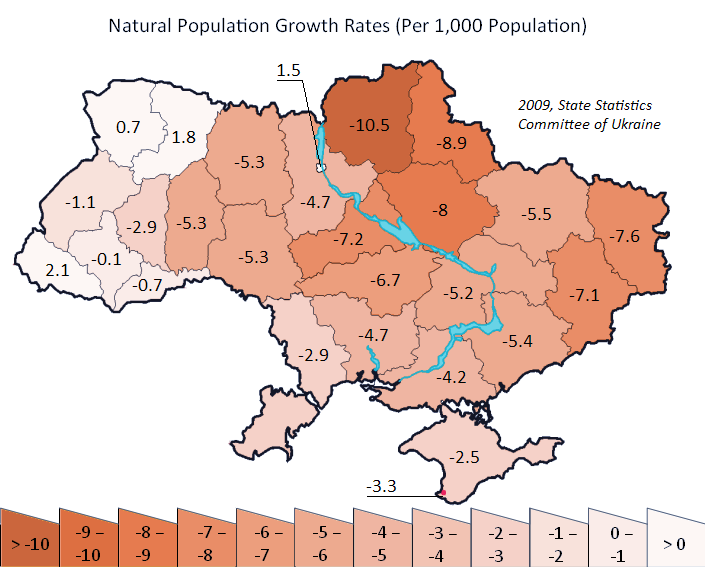
Natural population growth rates by oblast, 2009

Between the Soviet census of 1989 and the Ukrainian census of 2001, Ukraine's population declined from 51,706,600 to 48,457,020, a loss of 2,926,700 people, or 5.7% of the 1989 population. However, this trend was quite uneven and subject to regional variation. Two oblasts in western Ukraine, Rivne and Zakarpattia, saw slight population increases of 0.3% and 0.5%, respectively. A third western Ukrainian oblast, Volyn, lost less than 0.1% of its population between 1989 and 2001. Collectively, between 1989 and 2001, the seven westernmost Ukrainian oblasts lost 167,500 people, or 1.7% of their 1989 population. The total population of these oblasts in 2001 was 9,593,800.

Between 1989 and 2001, the population of Kyiv City increased by 0.3% due to positive net migration. Outside Kyiv, the central, southern and eastern oblasts experienced a severe population declines. Between 1989 and 2001, the Donetsk Oblast lost 491,300 people, or 9.2% of its 1989 population, while the neighbouring Luhansk Oblast lost 11% of its population. Chernihiv Oblast, in central Ukraine (northeast of Kyiv), lost 170,600 people, or 12% of its 1989 population, the highest percentage loss of any Ukrainian oblast. In southern Ukraine, Odesa Oblast lost 173,600 people, or 6.6% of its 1989 population.

By 2001, Crimea's population declined by 29,900, representing only a 1.4% loss of its 1989 population. This however was due to the influx of approximately 200,000 Crimean Tatars – equivalent to approximately 10% of Crimea's 1989 population – who arrived in Crimea after 1989 and whose population in that region increased by a factor of 6.4 (from 38,000 to 243,400 between 1989 and 2001). Collectively, the net population loss in Ukraine outside the westernmost oblasts was 2,759,200, or 6.6% of the 1989 population. The total population of these regions in 2001 was 39,186,100.

Overall in 1989–2001, the pattern of population change was one of slight growth in Kyiv, slight declines in western Ukraine, large declines in eastern, central and southern Ukraine, and a relatively small decline in Crimea due to a large influx of Crimean Tatars.

Natural population growth
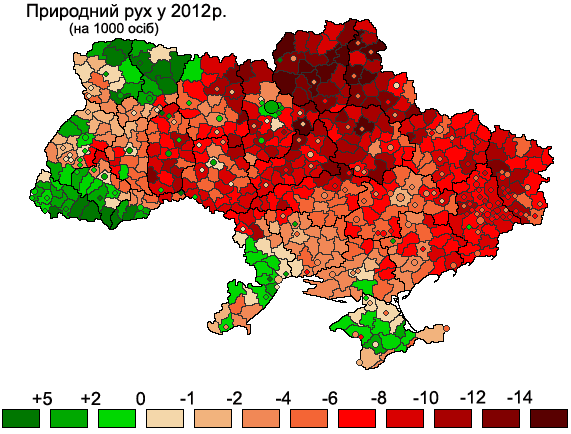
All population, 2012

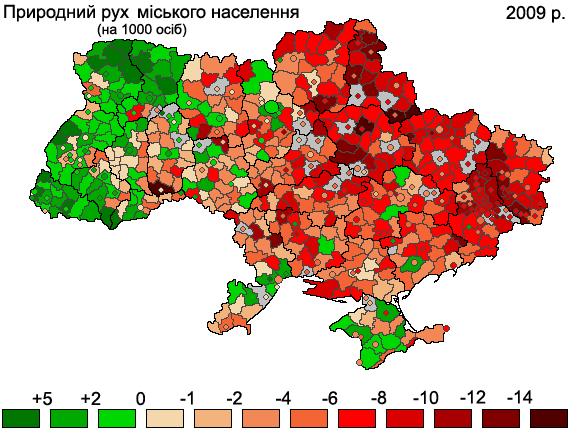
Urban population, 2009

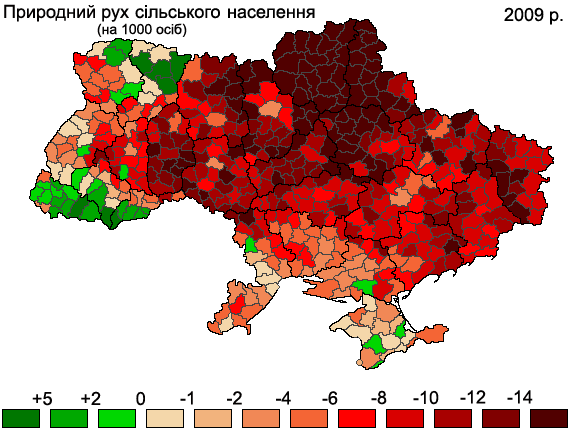
Rural population, 2009

=== Regional differences in birth and fertility rates ===
Ukraine's total fertility rate is one of the lowest in Europe. However, significant regional differences in birth rates may account for some of the demographic differences. In the third quarter of 2007, for instance, the highest birth rate among Ukrainian oblasts occurred in Volyn Oblast, with a birth rate of 13.4/1,000 people, compared to the Ukrainian countrywide average of 9.6/1,000 people. Volyn's birthrate was higher than the average birth rate of any European country except Iceland and Albania.

In 2007, for the first time since 1990, five Ukrainian oblasts (Zakarpattia, Rivne, Volyn, Lviv, and Kyiv oblasts) experienced more births than deaths. This demonstrated a positive trend of increasing birthrates in the preceding years throughout Ukraine. The ratio of births to deaths in those oblasts in 2007 was 119%, 117%, 110%, 100.7%, and 108%, respectively.

With the exception of the Kyiv Oblast, all of the oblasts with more births than deaths were in the less-industrially developed oblasts of western Ukraine. According to a spokesperson for Ukraine's Ministry of Justice, the overall ratio of births to deaths in Ukraine improved from 1 to 1.7 in 2004–2005 to 1 to 1.4 in 2008. However, the worst birth-to-death ratios in the country were in the eastern and central oblasts of Donetsk, Luhansk, Cherkasy and Poltava. These areas saw 2.1 deaths for every birth.

Notably, western Ukraine never experienced the Holodomor, as Poland, Czechoslovakia, and Romania ruled it at the time, helping to understand the more favorable demographic trends there, as the rural population was never devastated. Specifically, during the Holodomor, Poland ruled Ivano-Frankivsk, Lviv, Rivne, Ternopil, and Volyn oblasts, whereas Zakarpattia Oblast was under Czechoslovak rule, and Romania controlled Chernivtsi Oblast and the Budjak section of Odesa Oblast.

While abortion rates in the North, South, East and Center of Ukraine are relatively homogeneous, the Western region differs greatly. Overall, the abortion rate in western Ukraine is three times lower than in other regions. This is not due to increased use of modern contraceptive methods in the West, but to the fact that pregnant women in the Western regions are more likely to keep their babies. Donetsk and Dnipropetrovsk oblasts in eastern and central Ukraine have the country's highest abortion rate.

Natural population growth
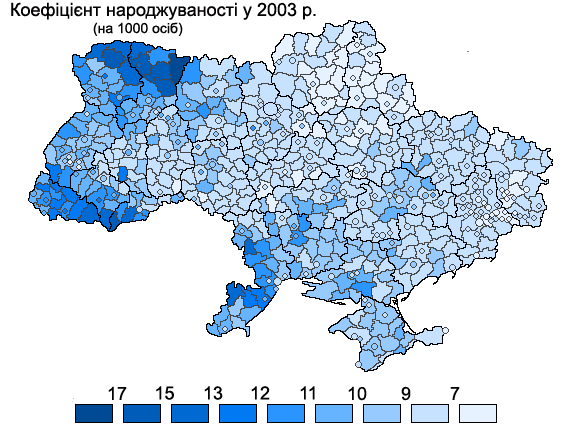
The birth rate in Ukraine, 2003.

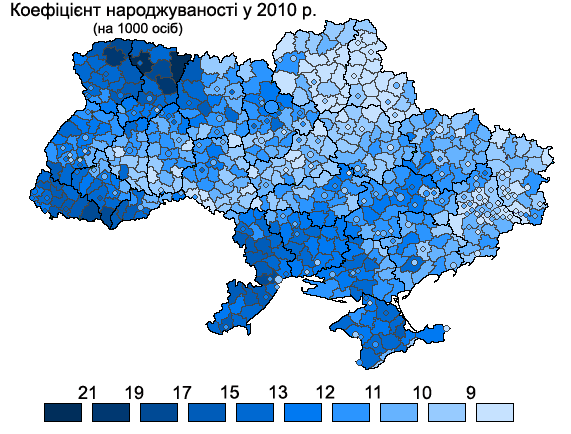
The birth rate in Ukraine, 2010.

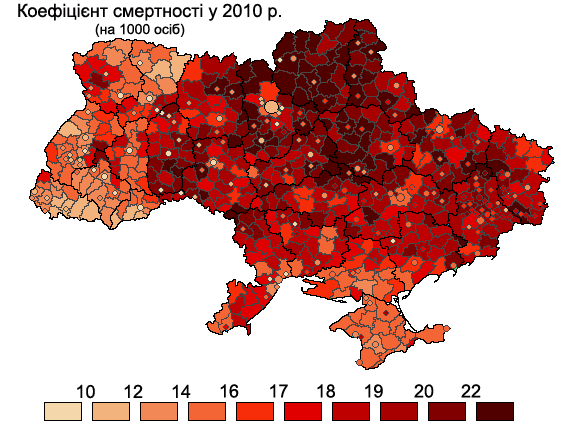
The death rate in Ukraine, 2010.

=== Regional differences in death rates and health ===
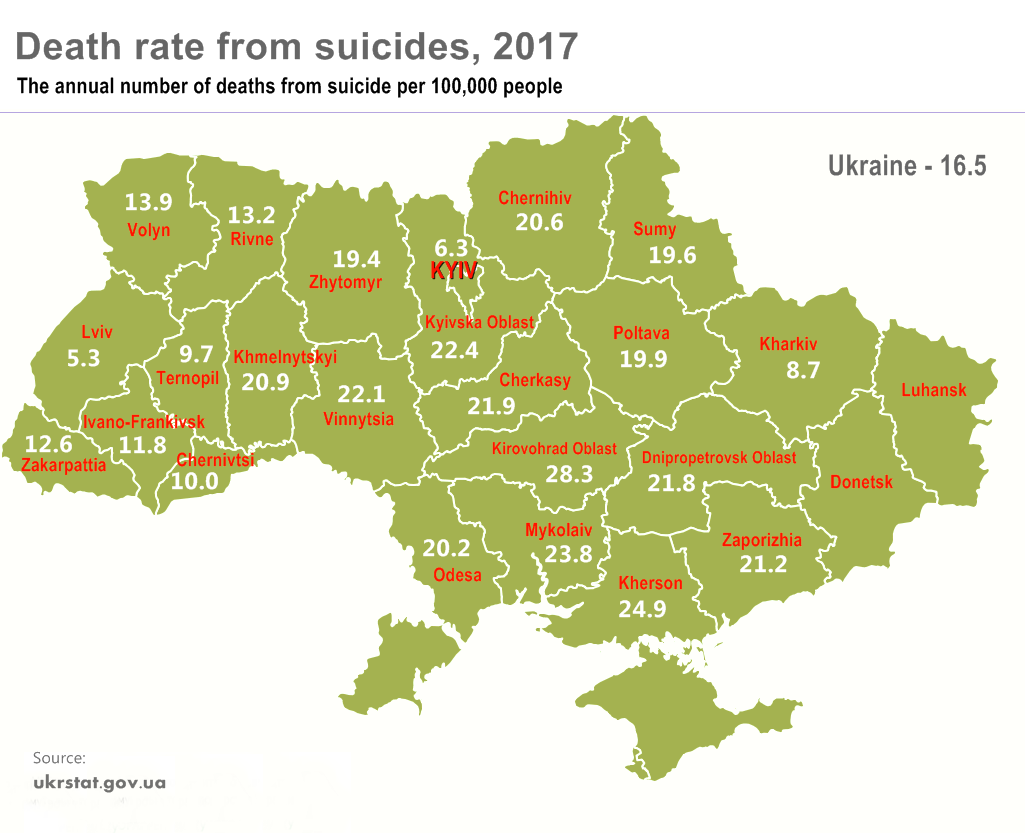
Death rate from suicides per 100.000 people

Death rates also vary widely by region; eastern and southern Ukraine have the highest death rates in the country, and the life expectancy for children born in Chernihiv, Dnipropetrovsk, Donetsk, Kherson, Kropyvnytskyi, Luhansk, Mykolaiv, and Odesa oblasts is 1.5 years lower than the national average.

Ukraine had a suicide rate of 16.5 per 100,000 population in 2017, a significant decrease from the suicide rate of 29.6 per 100,000 in 1998. Suicides were more frequent in the central part of the country (the highest suicide rate was in Kirovohrad Oblast); in western Ukraine, the suicide rate was lower than the national average. Lviv Oblast had the lowest suicide rate (5.3).

Southern and eastern Ukraine also suffered from the highest rates of HIV and AIDS, which impacts life expectancy. In late 2000, 60% of all AIDS cases in Ukraine were concentrated in the Odesa, Dnipropetrovsk, and Donetsk oblasts. A major reason behind the higher rates was that the urbanized and industrialized oblasts in the East and South of Ukraine suffered most from the economic crisis in the 1990s, leading to the increased spread of unemployment, alcoholism, and drug abuse, setting the conditions for a wider spread of the epidemic.

=== Regional differences in income ===
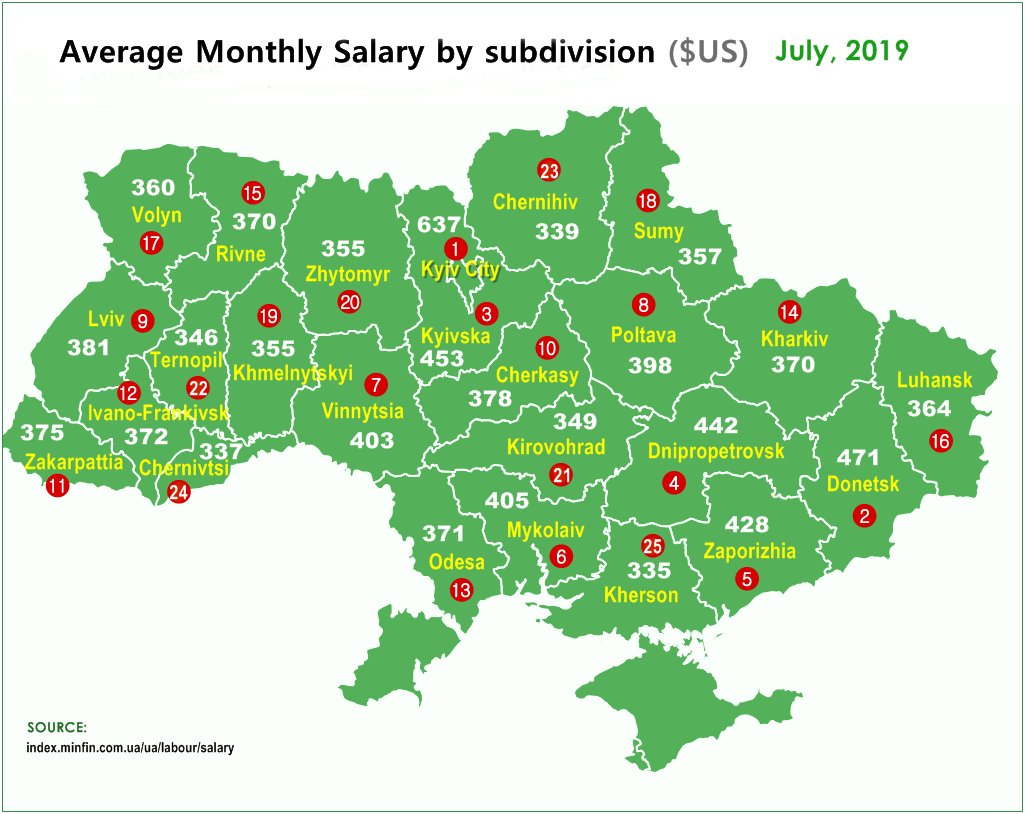
Average monthly salary by oblast in US dollars, 2019.

The western and central oblasts of Ukraine had lower GDP per capita than Kyiv and the industrialized eastern oblasts of Ukraine. In December 2019, the average monthly salary in Ukraine was 12,264 hryvnias (519 US dollars). Chernihiv Oblast (northern Ukraine) and Kirovohrad Oblast (central Ukraine) had the lowest monthly salary of 8,851 and 9,450 hryvnias, respectively. In contrast, the monthly wage in the city of Kyiv was 18,869 hryvnias per month, and in Kyiv Oblast, 13,259 per month. In 2013, outside of the capital city of Kyiv, the wealthiest oblast was Donetsk with an annual income of 31,048 hryvnias. But as of 2017, it ranked second poorest after Luhansk Oblast, with annual incomes 25,278 hryvnias and 16,416 hryvnias, respectively. Both are in eastern Ukraine and sustained direct losses as a consequence of military actions.

Ukraine recorded one of the sharpest declines in poverty of any transition economy in 2001–2016. The poverty rate, measured against an absolute poverty line (below $1.25 per day, based on World Bank numbers) fell from a high of 32 percent in 2001 to 8 percent in 2005. In terms of poverty rates, the central and northern oblasts have the country's highest poverty rates: 10.0%. The western and southern oblasts are 9.1% and 9%, respectively. Kyiv City had the lowest poverty rate: 1.4%. The percent of the population living under $5.50 a day was 19% in 2005 and dropped to 4.0 percent in 2018.

== Urbanization ==
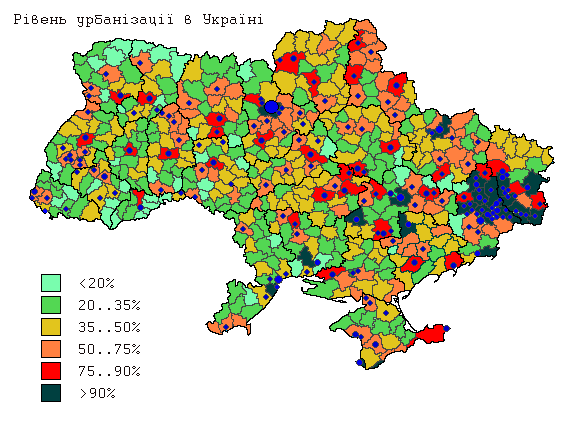
Urbanization rate, 2011

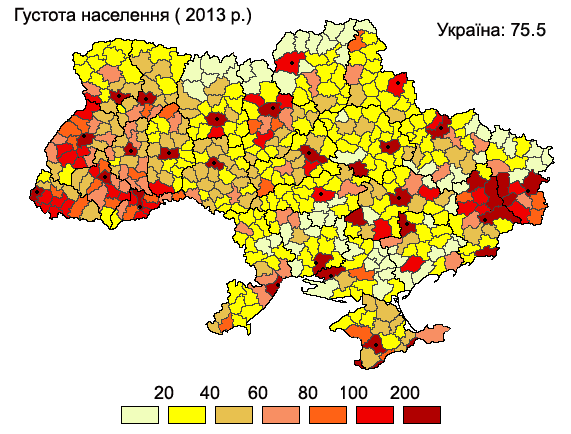
Population density, 2013

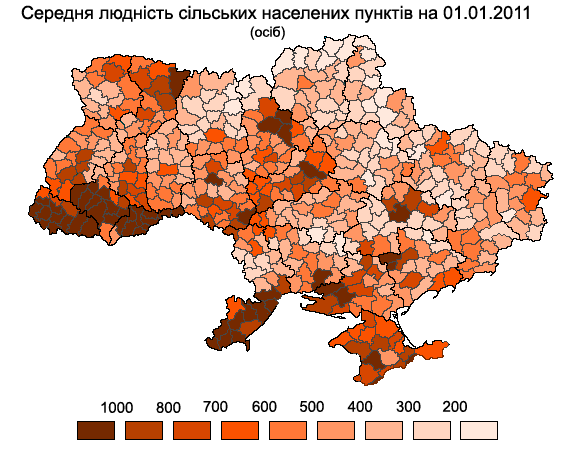
Median population of rural settlements, 2011

== Migration ==
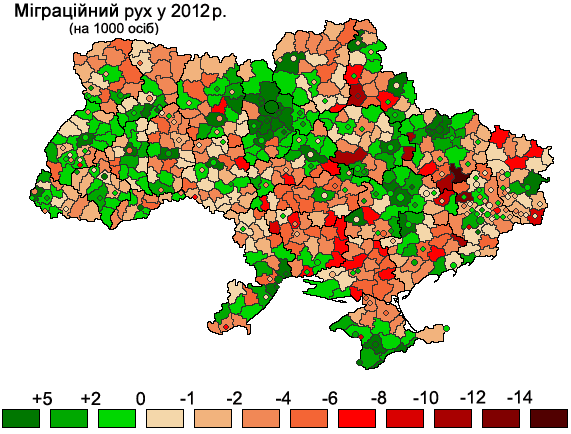
Migration growth rate per 1,000 people, 2012

=== Emigration ===
Ukraine is the major source of migrants for many EU member states. In the 1990s and early 2000s, Ukraine's sputtering economy and political instability contributed to rising emigration, especially to nearby Poland and Hungary, but also to other countries such as Italy, Portugal, Spain, Israel and Canada. Although estimates vary, approximately two to three million Ukrainian citizens were working abroad, in construction, service, housekeeping, and agriculture industries.

Between 1991 and 2004, the government counted 2,537,400 individuals who emigrated; 1,897,500 moved to other post-Soviet states, and 639,900 moved to other, mainly Western, states.

By the early 2000s, Ukrainian embassies reported that 300,000 Ukrainian citizens were working in Poland, 200,000 in Italy, approximately 200,000 in the Czech Republic, 150,000 in Portugal, 100,000 in Spain, 35,000 in Turkey, 20,000 in the United States and smaller but significant numbers in Austria, Belgium, France, Germany, Greece, Sweden, Switzerland and the United Kingdom. The largest number of Ukrainian workers abroad, about one million, were in Russia. Since 1992, 232,072 persons born in Ukraine have emigrated to the United States.

Yet absolute numbers are less relevant to the economic impact on host countries than the volume of immigration as a proportion of the native population. Italy had the highest rate of Ukrainian emigrants as a proportion of the native population, while the far more populous Russia had the largest absolute confirmed number of Ukrainian emigrants (excluding Poland, Portugal and the Czech Republic, for which there was conflicting data).

=== Immigration ===
Between 1991 and 2003, about 100,000 illegal immigrants were detained at the western borders of Ukraine. As of 2005, about 5,000 illegal immigrants were being detained yearly, mostly from China, India, Pakistan and Afghanistan. At the time, about 3,000 officially registered refugees resided in Ukraine, of whom most were Afghans.

Ukraine accepted some 62,000 refugees from Transnistria following its war in 1992. That same decade, thousands more were also accepted from other post-Soviet conflict zones in Abkhazia, Chechnya and Tajikistan.

Between the 1989 Soviet census and the 2001 census, an increased number of former CIS residents moved to Ukraine from war zones. The number of Armenians in Ukraine almost doubled to 99,900 people during this period, while the number of Georgians and Azerbaijanis also increased substantially.

As of April 2020, 1.4 million Ukrainians were internally displaced due to the war in Donbas.

== See also ==
- Health in Ukraine
- Demographic history of Crimea
- Ethnic groups in Ukraine

General:

- Ageing of Europe
