= Obesity in Ukraine =

Health issue in Ukraine

Obesity in Ukraine is a health issue. Overall, 53% are considered overweight and 20% meet the definition of obesity. The Donetsk and Poltava regions are considered the most overweight. The lack of a healthy diet has been cited as a cause of obesity.

== Overview ==
The percentage of overweight Ukrainians is at 53% of the population, and the percentage of those who meet the definition of obese is 20%. Statistics show that Ukrainians continue to gain weight. Doctors claim that the worst-affected regions are Donetsk and Poltava. Crimea is considered "the most slender region of the country", and the percentage of overweight people there is 49,7%; the percentage who meet the definition of obesity is 12,3%.

== Causes ==
The Ukrainian Health Ministry stated in late 2012 that 70% of Ukrainians do not eat enough fruits and vegetables. Eating the wrong food can "lead to a deficiency of essential nutrients in the body, digestive system and heart, obesity, diabetes and even cancer."

== See also ==
- Health in Ukraine
