= Health in Ukraine =

Historical development of life expectancy

In Ukraine, the Human Rights Measurement Initiative finds that country is fulfilling 79.4% of what they should be achieving for the right to health, based on their level on income.

== Health status ==
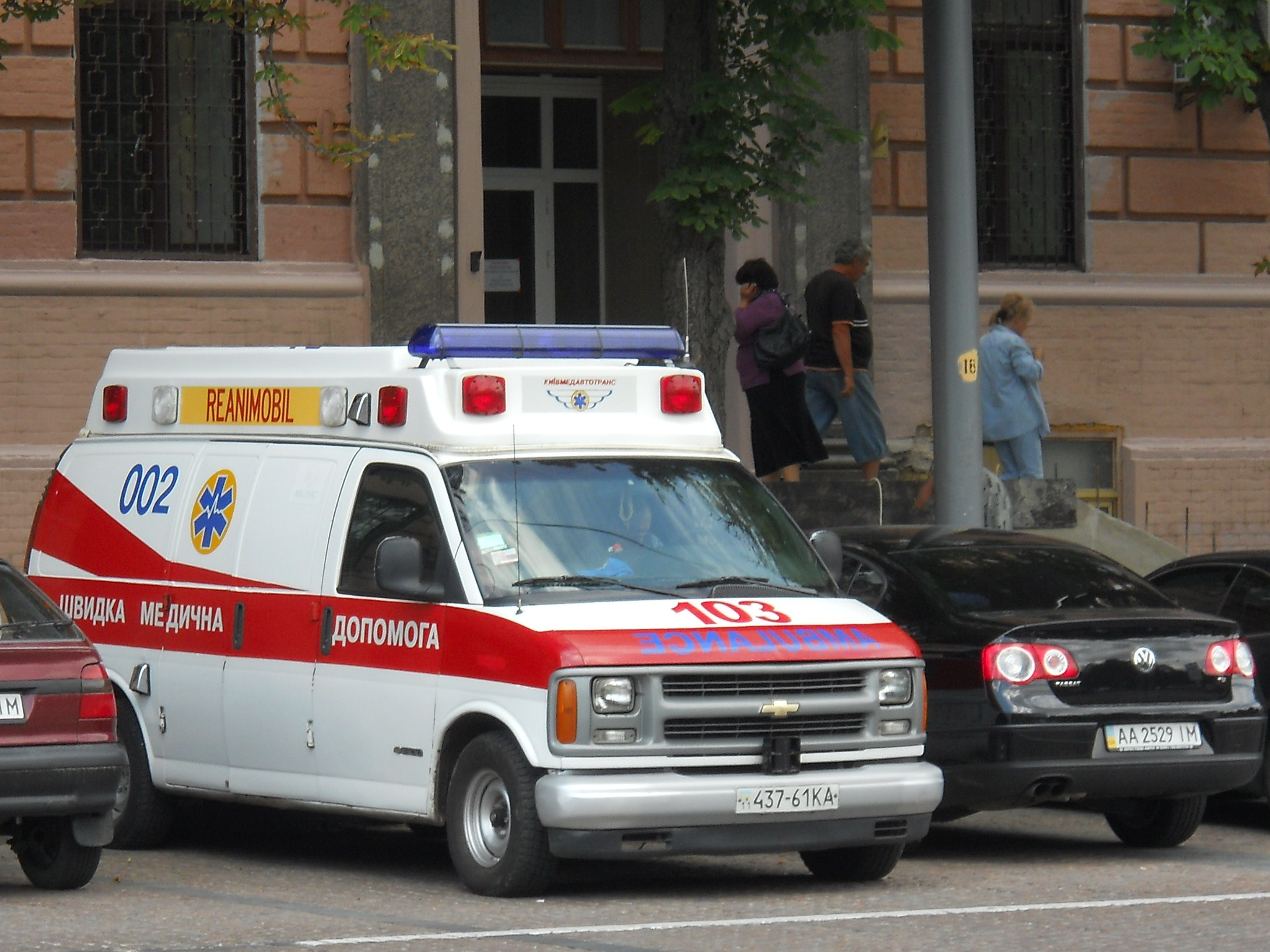
An ambulance in Kyiv.

=== Vaccinations ===
The crumbling, poorly financed healthcare system and rumours that children have fallen ill or even died after being immunised have led to a very poor vaccination rate. In August 2016, 30% of children in Ukraine were fully immunized against measles, 11%, against hepatitis B, and 3% of against diphtheria, pertussis and tetanus. At the time Ukraine had the lowest routine immunization rate in the world.

As of June 2019, Ukraine is suffering one of the world's worst measles epidemics with more than 100,000 cases since 2017, with 16 deaths in 2018. In 2016 only 31% of the population had been immunised with the MMR vaccine. Various reasons are given for the low rate of vaccination including: a distrust of the state in the 1990s, a failure to keep vaccine supplies reliably refrigerated leading to ineffectiveness, a poorly informed medical profession and a high level of vaccine distrust in the wider population. Children are required to be vaccinated before entering the school system, but Unicef estimates that as many as 30% of vaccination certificates are falsified.

=== High blood pressure and obesity ===
According to a study, entitled "Main reasons for the high death rate in Ukraine" conducted by the World Bank and released in December 2010 every third Ukrainian aged 18–65, including every fifth aged 18–25, had a high blood pressure. Almost 29% of the respondents suffered from being overweight, and 20% suffered from obesity.

=== Smoking ===
According to the above-mentioned 2010 World Bank study 36% (28.6% is the average in Europe) of Ukrainians smoke tobacco, including 31% of those who smoke every day. Men with primary education and women with higher education are inclined to smoking. Some 80% of daily smokers are men. The average age that daily smokers start the habit is decreasing, and at present is 16 years. In the younger age group there are four times as many smokers as in the older age group. The smallest percentage of smokers is to be found in the west of the country (24.6%), while the largest is in the east (34%).

=== Disability ===
2.7 million people in Ukraine (6%) were reported as having a disability in 2014. This number did not include the (reportedly) 1.5% of people with temporary disabilities. In 2014, 35% of people aged 60–70 had some age-related disability. For people aged over 80 years, this number grew to 50%.

Ukraine is notoriously "disability unfriendly". For example, in the capital Kyiv only 4% of infrastructure is considered to be "disability friendly".

=== HIV/AIDS ===
Ukraine has one of the fastest growing HIV/AIDS epidemics in the world. About 1.63 percent of Ukrainian adults, or about 756,300 citizens, were estimated to be living with HIV/AIDS in 2007, up from 1.46 percent of the population in 2005, or 685,600 citizens, according to UNAIDS. The statistics only reflect official cases, while those infected is likely higher according to UNAIDS. The number of HIV/AIDS cases in Ukraine reduced by 200 or 3.9% to 4,900 in the period of January–November 2008, compared with the corresponding period of last year. Ukraine has one of the highest rates of increase of HIV/AIDS cases in Eastern Europe.

=== Mental health ===
A 2017 article in The Independent reports that due to its mainly macho, patriarchal culture there is great resistance to psychotherapy in Ukraine. Weak mechanisms for licensing effective counsellors aggravates this resistance and a shame fostered by the years Ukraine was part of the Soviet Union (Note: As the Ukrainian SSR Ukraine was part of the Soviet Union since 1920 until Ukraine declared its independence from the Soviet Union on 24 August 1991.) compounds the problem, owing to Soviet authorities rendering psychiatry a tool for punishment (by imprisoning political dissidents in asylums) demonised mental health issues further.

== Mortality ==
2007 and 2008 — 16.4 cases per 1,000 population. At the same time, a number of oblasts have much higher mortality rates: Chernihiv — 21,1 %, Sumy and Kirovohrad — 18,6, Donetsk — 18,1, Luhansk — 17,9 %. Negative natural increase in 2008 was observed in all regions of Ukraine, except Zakarpattia and Rivne regions and Kyiv.

Structure of causes of death in 2008:

diseases of the circulatory system — 63.7%

- neoplasms — 12.0%,
- external causes of death — 8.0%.
- Infant and maternal mortality rates in 2008:
- 10.3 per 1,000 live births, which is 6.3% less than in 2007.
- 76 cases of maternal death, amounting to 14.9 per 100 thousand live births. The level of maternal losses in Sumy region is 36.9, in Chernivtsi region — 36, in Mykolaiv region — 29.9, in Kirovograd region — 28.4, in Kyiv region — 24.7 and in the Autonomous Republic of Crimea — 25.8.

== Demographic decline ==
Ukraine is considered to be in a demographic crisis due to its high death rate and a low birth rate. The current Ukrainian birth rate is 11 births/1,000 population, and the death rate is 16.3 deaths/1,000 population. A factor contributing to the relatively high death is a high mortality rate among working-age males from preventable causes such as alcohol poisoning and smoking.

In 2008, the country's population was one of the fastest declining in the world at -5% growth. The UN warned that Ukraine's population could fall by as much as 10 million by 2050 if trends did not improve.

== See also ==
- Healthcare in Ukraine
- 2009 flu pandemic in Ukraine
- Obesity in Ukraine
- COVID-19 pandemic in Ukraine
- Suicide in Ukraine
