= Emergency medicine reform in Ukraine since 2016 =

Government improvements to emergency medical care

Emergency medicine reform in Ukraine has been part of Ukraine's healthcare reform program since its launch in 2016. Managed by the Ministry of Healthcare of Ukraine, the program is meant to improve the quality and speed of Ukraine's emergency medical care.

== General information ==
Ukraine has a Franco-German model of emergency medical service, in which ambulances are staffed by physicians. Some ambulances are staffed by feldshers. As of 2016, in Ukraine, about one-third of staff positions on emergency medical teams were vacant. Young doctors did not frequently join EMS teams so the majority of doctors were those of pre-retirement age. There was a lack of ambulances and some were not fully equipped. Some brigades had staff without proper education.

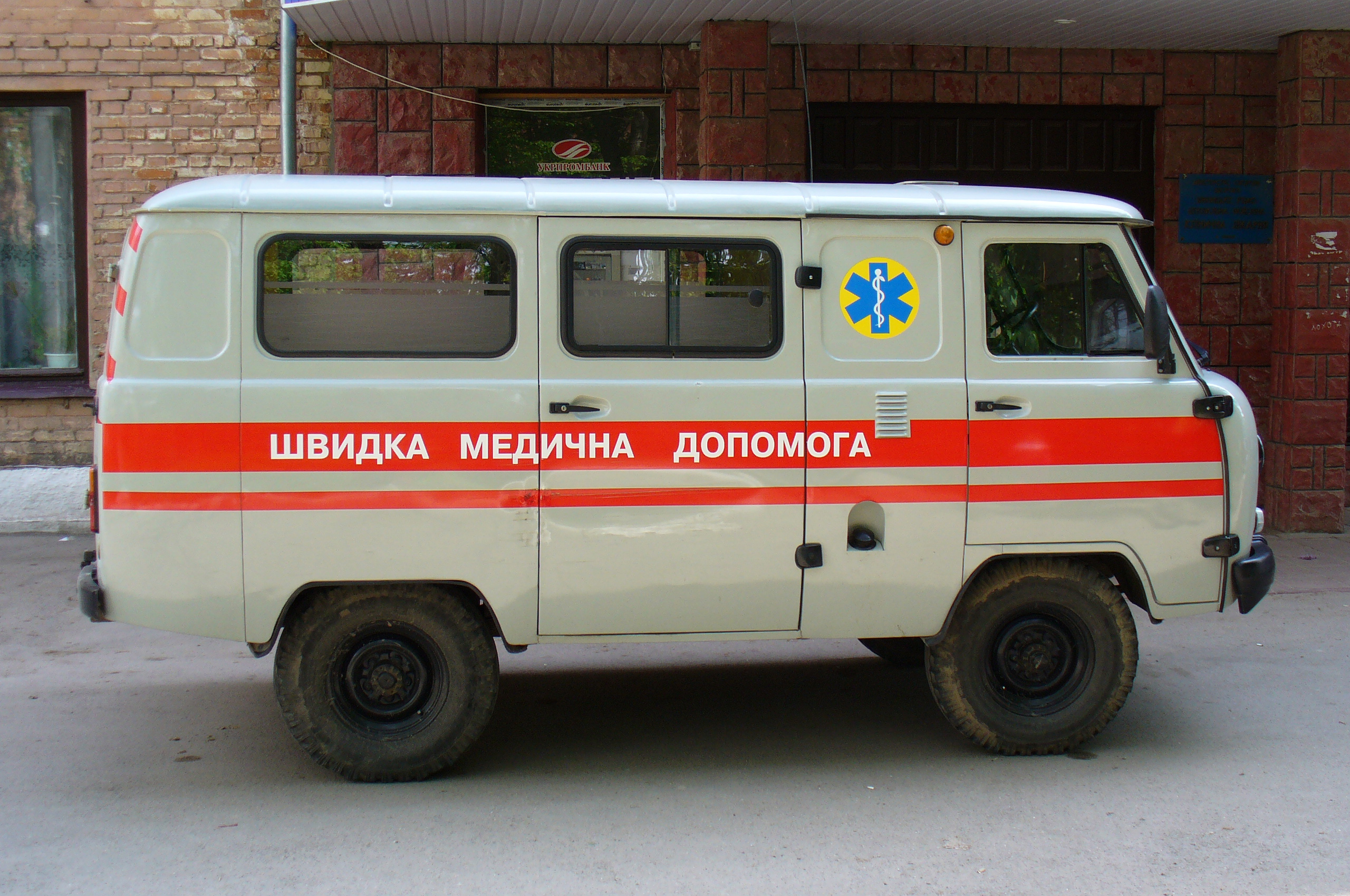
UAZ-396295 (modification of UAZ-3962). Used in emergency medical services (EMS). Ukraine.

The US faced a similar issue in the 1960s. The United States National Academy of Sciences published an influential report "Accidental Death and Disability: The Neglected Disease of Modern Society" in 1966. The report concluded that both the public and government were "insensitive to the magnitude of the problem of accidental death and injury" in the US. The standards to which an ambulance service were held were diverse and "often low" and "most ambulances used in this country are unsuitable, have incomplete... equipment, carry inadequate supplies and are manned by untrained attendants." The reforms inaugurated by the publication of "The White Paper" led to higher quality care provided on-scene and in transit by trained paramedics and EMTs.

Active reforming of emergency medical care was initiated right after the appointment of Ulana Suprun as head of the Ministry of Healthcare of Ukraine. There were several main areas of this reform:

- Improvement of the non-medical person training,
- Standardisation of medical care on the principles of evidence-based medicine,
- Introduction of EMTs and paramedics into the Ukrainian emergency medical service system,
- Training of personnel by new programs,
- Improvement of medical dispatching and
- Introduction of emergency departments.

== Improvement of non-medical persons training ==
To improve a patient's survival from preventable causes of death, it was necessary to strengthen the whole chain of survival. There are several levels in pre-hospital care in Ukraine:

- Persons obliged to provide care for those in emergency conditions (the equivalent of the international term "Emergency Medical Responder"),
- Emergency medical technicians,
- Paramedics and
- Emergency medicine physicians.

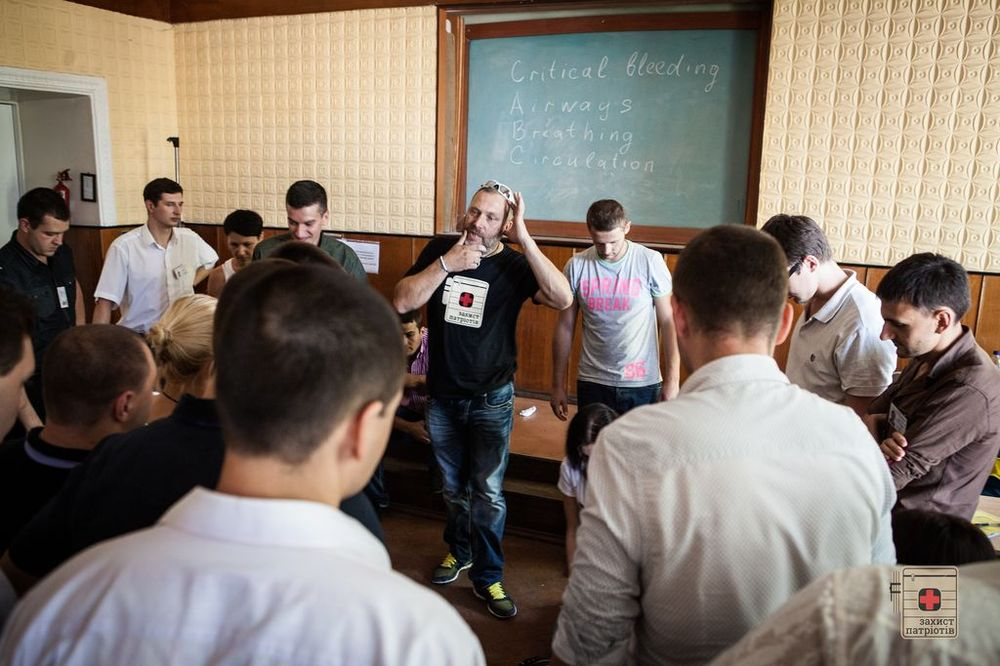
Patriot Defense instructors train policemen in emergency care.

According to Ukrainian legislation, there were no official terms for "emergency medical responder" or "first responder." There were, though, equivalents to these positions:

- Rescuers of emergency rescue service,
- State fire brigade workers,
- Police officers,
- Pharmaceutical workers,
- Conductors of passenger trains,
- Flight attendants and
- Other persons who did not have a medical education, but in their official duties they provided practical skills for premedical care.

After police reform, National Police officers were obliged to provide emergency medical care to those who suffered as a result of offenses or accidents as well as to those who were in a helpless condition or face dangers to their life or health.

In March 2017, the Ministry of Healthcare of Ukraine approved new training programs for those who were obliged to provide emergency medical assistance and introduced two new specialties of medical instructors: pre-hospital care instructors and first aid instructors.

The MOH of Ukraine introduced new standards for supplying vehicle first aid kits. In Ukraine there were about 554 traffic accidents every day. Mortality was higher there than in other European countries. At the same time, the first-aid kit standards had not changed since 1997. These new standards were based on evidence-based medicine and Western practices.

== Standardisation of medical care ==
=== New clinical guidelines ===
Research by the Better Regulation Delivery Office showed that Ukraine's regulatory landscape for providing medical care was "clogged up," with more than a third of the acts deemed "obsolete, irrelevant and ineffective."

In April 2017, the Ministry of Healthcare allowed Ukrainian doctors to use international clinical guidelines to provide medical care according to world standards. Prior to this, clinical guidelines were adapted from international clinical guidelines or in some cases, based on the clinical experience of group members. Some were created on the old Soviet evidence base. In addition, Ukraine's clinical guidelines contained trade names for certain drugs, which led to lobbying of the relevant pharmaceutical companies.

With the same order, the Health Ministry eliminated the need for implementation of local clinical protocols. Previously, each medical facility was forced to individually develop such documents. Often, they were based on outdated information and on the individual clinical experience of the authors. At the same time, they were much more important legally than global guidelines. The Ministry allowed each institution to translate international protocols based on evidence-based medicine. It defined a clear list of international sources for such translation and approval.

=== HeRAMS Ukraine ===
In autumn 2017, the World Health Organization launched the HeRAMS Ukraine project in cooperation with the MOH of Ukraine.

HeRAMS (Health Resources Availability Mapping System) is an electronic system for monitoring medical resources. It is a WHO tool for standardising and assessing the availability of medical services in different countries. It is mostly used for emergency response. When conducting programs using HeRAMS, information is collected from health facilities in a specific region pertaining to four aspects:

- Health care establishments (number, type...),
- Resources for the provision of services (water supply, cold chain...),
- Availability of medical services in certain spheres (emergency medicine at the pre-hospital and hospital stages, trauma care...) and
- Reasons for the lack of medical services (lack of medical staff, poor training...).

From this data, analytical reports are prepared to guide further management and allow for periodic monitoring.

At first, the HeRAMS project was launched only in Donetsk and Luhansk regions.

=== Military emergency medicine ===
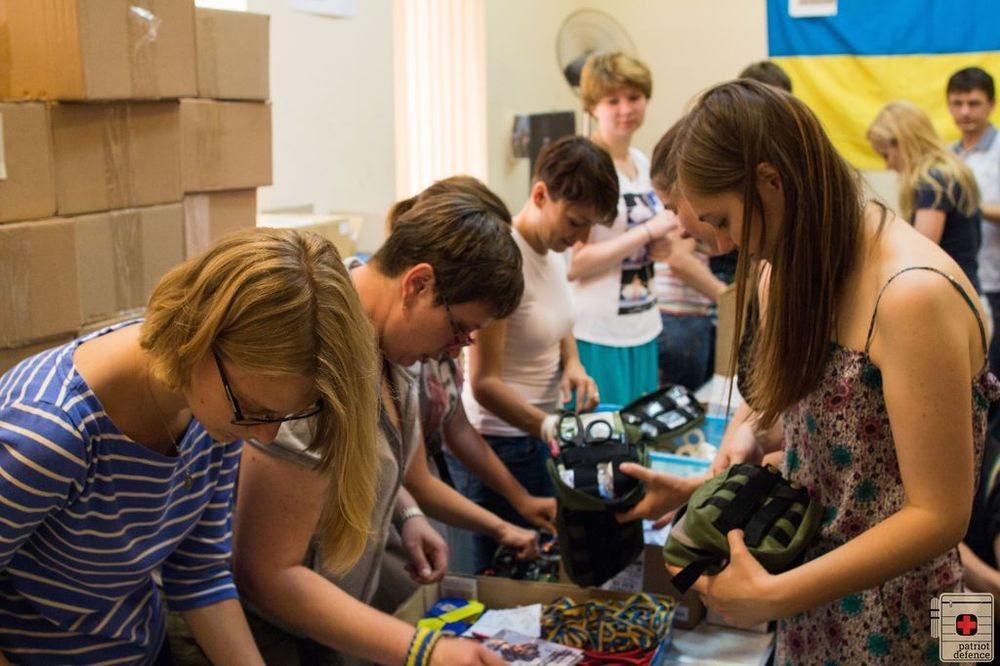
Compiling of military first aid kits by Patriot Defence volunteers for Ukrainian soldiers in Eastern Ukraine. 2015.

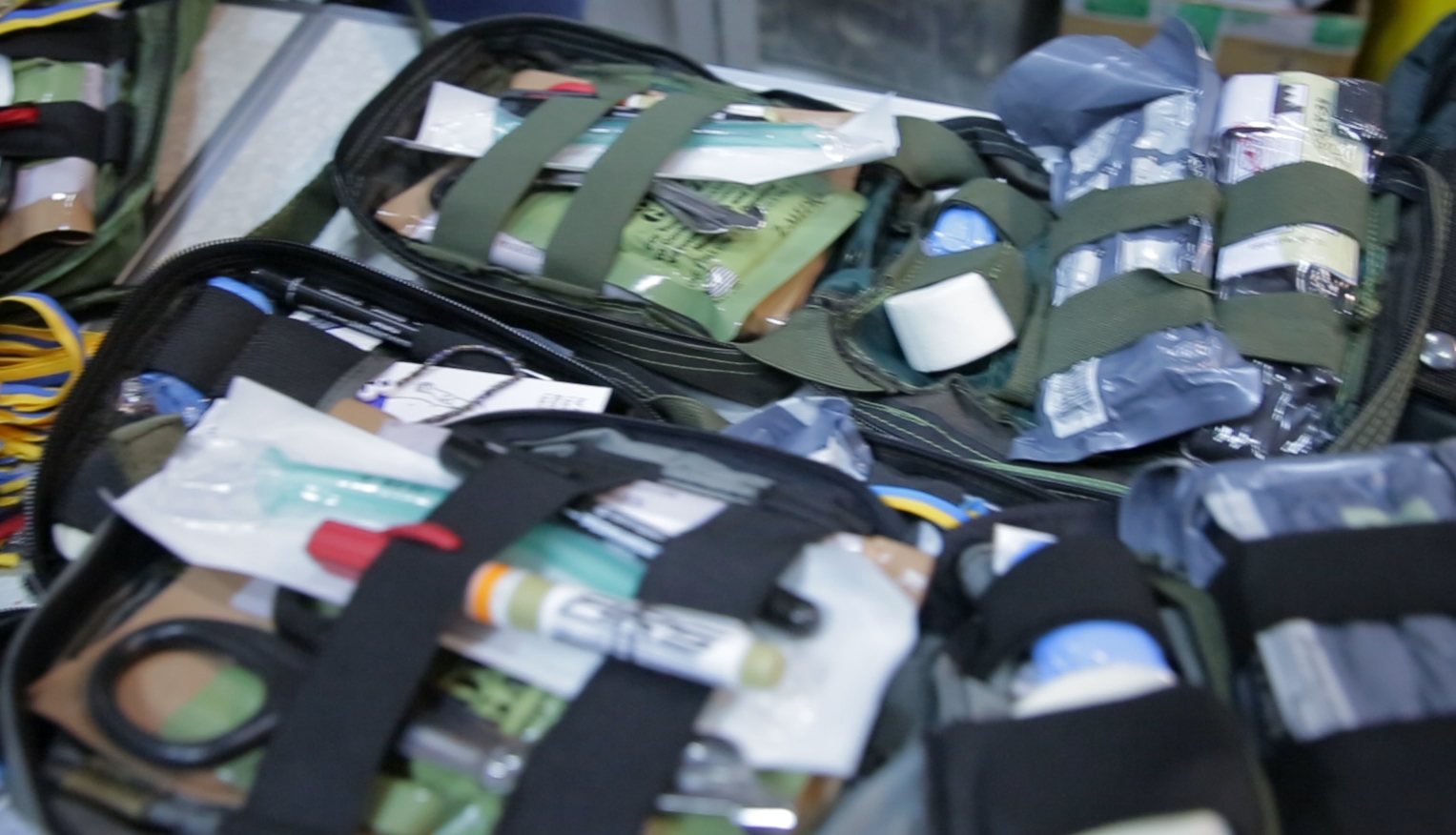
Volunteer military IFAKs.

In January 2017, the MOH of Ukraine approved a modern military first aid kit, a military car first aid kit and backpacks for field medics. Their contents are selected in accordance with the Tactical Combat Casualty Care guidelines.

The MOH and Ministry of Defense of Ukraine established standards for medical support of the Armed Forces at every level except large hospitals. Drugs with no proven efficiency were excluded, for example. Each medical facility or military unit will have the same equipment and medicine provide consistent, high quality medical care.

There is a lack of medical staff in the majority of hospitals in Lugansk and Donetsk region. To improve this situation, medical volunteers from other regions are allowed by MOH order to work there. The government believes that this measure will not only improve health and save lives for local populations but for soldiers who are treated in these hospitals.

== Introduction of EMT and paramedics ==
In 2017, the MOH of Ukraine introduced two specialties: paramedics and emergency medical technicians.

=== Paramedic ===
In Ukraine, paramedics are people with a level of education not lower than a junior bachelor in the field of healthcare and the corresponding specialisation. For example, after 11 years of school, a student needs to study for another 3 years to become a paramedic. For a person with basic 9-year education, training lasts 4 years.

In Ukraine, paramedics provide an ALS level of care. Qualifying requirements for paramedics are higher than those for a feldsher. The paramedic training program is more focused on providing emergency medical care. They have more advanced requirements for professional skills in this area. In September 2018, the first classes of paramedic candidates began study in medical colleges.

Feldshers working in emergency medical teams will be able to become paramedics after undergoing advanced training at the paramedic level. The MOH has defined a transitional period of 5 years for training and certification of feldshers to the paramedic level. During this time they may work on EMS teams.

During the transition period, emergency medicine physicians will still work in ambulances. Currently, physicians often attend to simple cases that do not require their high qualifications; at the end of the transition period, they should be engaged only in severe cases, as it is in many developed countries. Most are expected to work in emergency departments to take advantage of the expanded medical and professional opportunities.

=== Emergency medical technician ===
In Ukraine, ambulances are driven by ambulance drivers. In the past, these employees were not trained in emergency care, so a new speciality, emergency medical technician (EMT), was introduced. Personnel will continue to work during a 5-year transition period until certified.

New EMT professionals correspond to the EMT-Basic professionals in the US. In Ukraine, an EMT:

- Works under the guidance of a physician or paramedic,
- Provides care in the EMS team,
- Assists the emergency department staff;
- Interacts with other medical services,
- Evaluates the environment regarding possible threats to him or other people,
- Participates in triage,
- Assesses the patient's condition,
- Examines the patient for urgent conditions,
- Conducts CPR,
- Provides care in case of adverse reactions to medicines,
- Assists in transporting patients and transports patients to health care facilities,
- Provides basic medical support during large events and
- Drives and prepares the ambulance for emergency care.

The minimum professional requirements for an EMT in Ukraine are:

- Full secondary EMT education and training,
- Possession of a certificate of EMT training and
- A driver's license appropriate for driving an ambulance.

The training term to become an EMT lasts about a month and includes classroom and practical skills training.

== New training programs for emergency staff ==
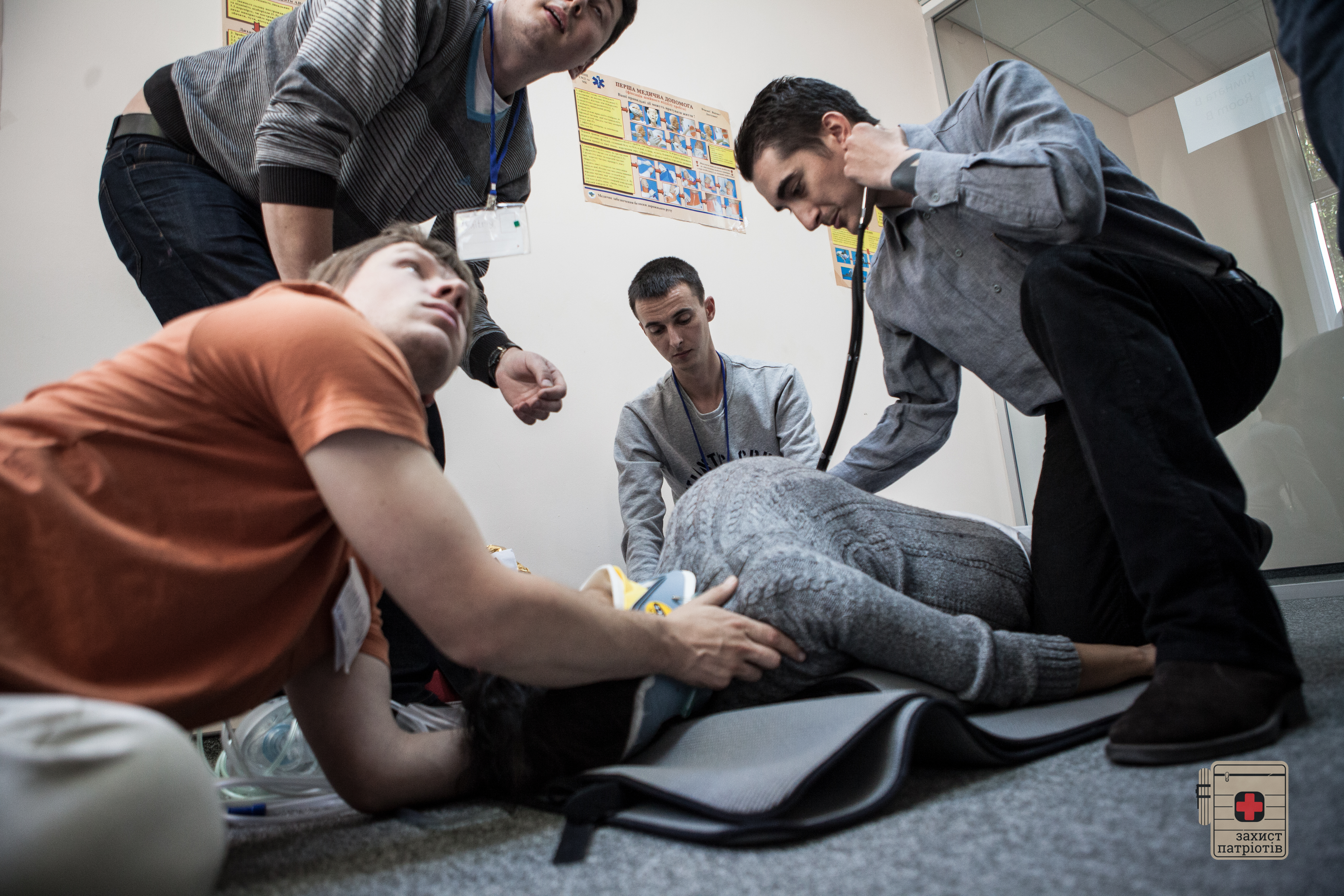
Teaching modern principles of trauma care. Photo by Patriot Defence.

With the participation of British and American physicians, a six-day training course called "Ukrainian Trauma Life Support" (UTLS) was developed. The course is intended for physicians providing emergency medical care, including surgeons, anesthesiologists, traumatologists and emergency medicine doctors.

The program incorporates the main requirements of the relevant international counterparts such as PHTLS, ALS and ATLS. It uses seminars, workshops and simulations.

In October 2017, at the NMAPE Academic Council meeting, the curriculum of the on-site training cycle of thematic improvement "Supporting life during injuries—Ukrainian program" was discussed and approved.

== Improvement of medical dispatching ==
In most oblasts of Ukraine, raions or cities have their own emergency medical dispatch centres. They coordinate teams from only their own station and typically send teams out only within their area of responsibility. As a result, if accidents take place near the border of a neighboring area, the dispatcher may not be able to see it. Consequently, the dispatcher may not be able to send ambulances even if they are nearby. In some raions, calls are taken by doctors or untrained nurses. centralised dispatch centres that take calls and coordinate EMS teams of the entire oblast exist only in a few regional centres.

With the introduction of modern centralised dispatch centres, specially trained dispatchers at the oblast level will take calls from the whole region. Using the dispatch protocols, a dispatcher determines whether there is an urgent need to send an ambulance. Additionally, all ambulances are to be equipped with GPS trackers. Using the modern system allows the dispatcher to see both the location of all calls and EMS teams in real-time on an interactive map. The dispatcher can then direct the nearest crew to the emergency. This technology optimizes the provision of timely medical care even with limited resources.

== Introduction of emergency departments ==
An emergency department (ED) is where emergency medical care is provided in a hospital or primary care centre. Patients needing such care arrive by their own means or via ambulance, most often without a prior appointment.

Currently, most hospitals in Ukraine have reception departments (Ukrainian: приймальне відділення, IPA: [ˈprɪjmɐlʲne wiˈd⁽ʲ⁾ːilenʲːɐ]). There are often no beds for patients to stay and no conditions for providing high quality care. Moreover, there is often no physician for a full day, and at times, there are on-duty physicians from non-emergency specialties that cannot provide proper emergency care.

According to the healthcare reform, an ED should be a standard part of a multi-profile hospital. Only specially trained doctors of emergency medicine should work in EDs to provide a better quality of patient care.

== Russian invasion of Ukraine ==
The Russian invasion of Ukraine has left countless without proper medical care. See more Russian strikes on hospitals during the Russian invasion of Ukraine.

== See also ==
- Healthcare in Ukraine
- Russian invasion of Ukraine
