= Heorhii Mankovskyi =

Ukrainian cardiologist (born 1987)

- Георгій Маньковський
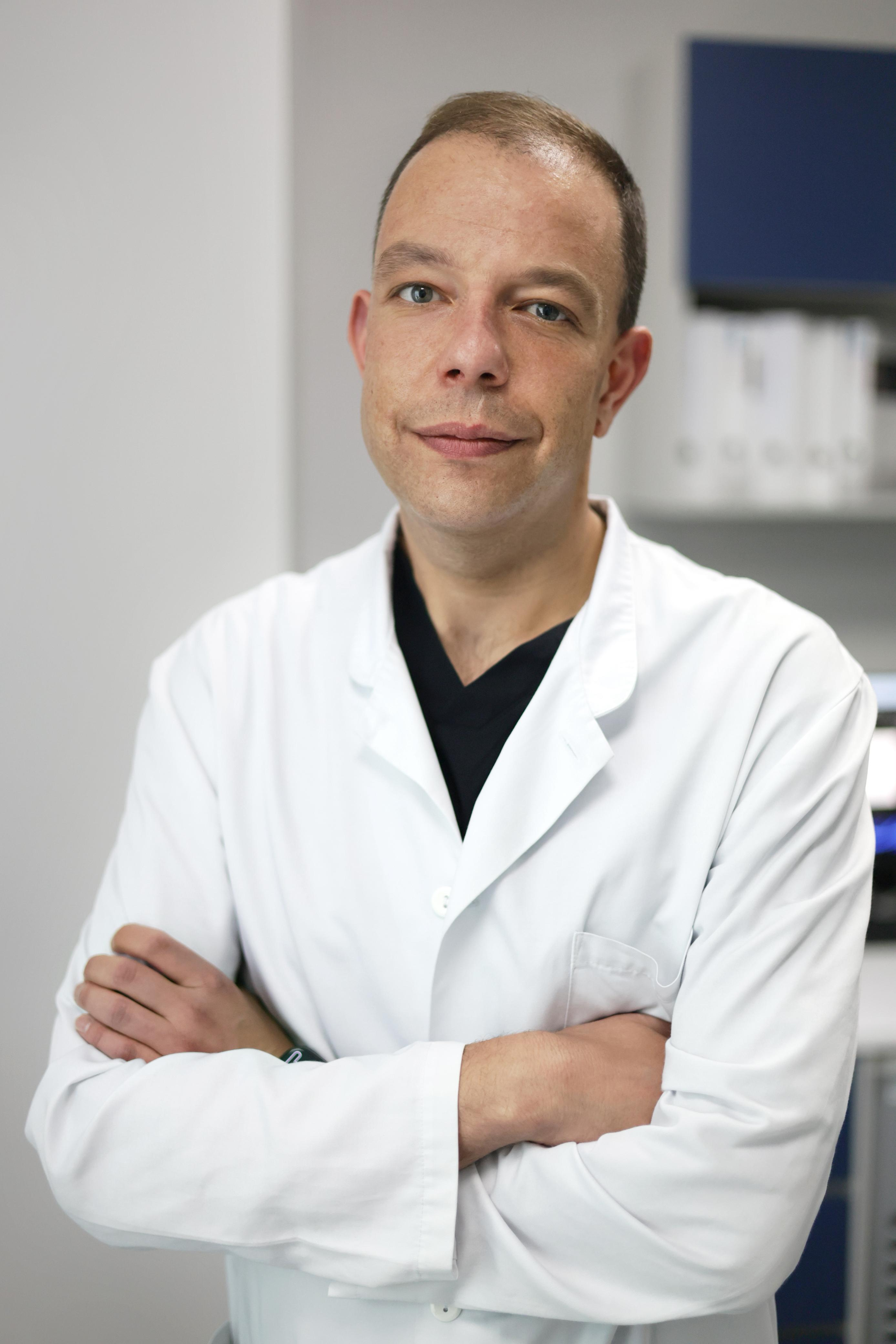
- Born: Heorhii Borysovych Mankovskyi; 21 March 1987 (age 39); Kyiv, Ukrainian SSR, Soviet Union
- Citizenship: Ukraine
- Education: Bogomolets National Medical University; National University of Pharmacy
- Awards: Order of Prince Yaroslav the Wise, fifth class (2026); Order of Merit, third class (2024); Honored Doctor of Ukraine (2021)
- Scientific career
- Fields: Cardiology; Interventional cardiology Cardiovascular surgery
- Workplaces: Center for Cardiology and Cardiac Surgery, Ministry of Health of Ukraine
- Academic advisors: Illia Yemets (Candidate of Sciences)

Heorhii Borysovych Mankovskyi (Ukrainian: Георгій Борисович Маньковський; born 21 March 1987) is a Ukrainian cardiologist and specialist in interventional cardiology. He holds a Doctor of Medical Sciences degree (2026). Since 12 January 2026, he has served as director general of the Center for Cardiology and Cardiac Surgery of the Ministry of Health of Ukraine, formerly the Scientific and Practical Medical Center for Pediatric Cardiology and Cardiac Surgery. He received the honorary title of Honored Doctor of Ukraine in 2021.

== Early life and education ==
Mankovskyi earned a bachelor's degree in marketing from the National University of Pharmacy in 2008 and a master's degree in the same subject in 2010. Also in 2010, he graduated with honours from Bogomolets National Medical University with a qualification in general medicine.

He completed an internship in internal medicine at the Department of Therapy and Rheumatology of the Shupyk National Medical Academy of Postgraduate Education and qualified in cardiology in 2012. From 2012 to 2014, he undertook a clinical residency at the Department of Interventional Cardiology and X-ray Surgery of the Strazhesko Institute of Cardiology, part of the National Academy of Medical Sciences of Ukraine. In 2023, he completed specialist training in healthcare organisation and management at the Ukrainian Military Medical Academy.

== Career ==
Mankovskyi began working in interventional cardiology during his internship in the department headed by Yurii Sokolov at the Strazhesko Institute of Cardiology. From 2012 to 2015, he worked as a cardiologist in the institute's Department of Coronary and Endovascular Surgery. In 2014, he also worked in the corresponding department at Batumi Referral Hospital in Batumi, Georgia. He undertook further clinical training at Hirslanden Klinik Im Park in Zurich in 2015 and at the German Heart Center Munich in 2016.

In 2015, he joined the Scientific and Practical Medical Center for Pediatric Cardiology and Cardiac Surgery of the Ministry of Health of Ukraine as a cardiologist in its emergency interventional department. He headed the department from 2016 to 2019. He served as deputy director for scientific and clinical work from 2019 to 2023 and as medical director from 2023 to 2025. In 2023, he became an expert adviser to the Ministry of Health on cardiology and cardiac surgery.

On 12 January 2026, he was appointed director general of the centre.

=== Reorganisation of the centre ===
In late March 2026, the Ministry of Health decided to reorganise the centre. The plans included transferring its Clinical Building No. 1 to Okhmatdyt and converting the centre into a state-owned non-commercial company. The centre's founder, Illia Yemets, criticised the decision, arguing that the reorganisation would effectively destroy the institution. Hlib Yemets, a former department head, warned that approximately one-third of the staff could lose their jobs. Paediatric cardiac surgeons from hospitals in the United States and Europe also expressed support for the centre.

Mankovskyi denied that the centre was being closed, stating that no employees had been dismissed and that the institution was being converted into a state-owned non-commercial company through the same process as other healthcare institutions.

== Research ==
On 5 March 2019, Mankovskyi defended his Candidate of Medical Sciences dissertation, entitled "Long-term outcomes of myocardial revascularisation in patients with coronary artery disease and disorders of carbohydrate metabolism", at the Amosov National Institute of Cardiovascular Surgery of the National Academy of Medical Sciences of Ukraine. His academic supervisor was Illia Yemets.

On 9 January 2026, he defended his Doctor of Medical Sciences dissertation at the same institution. Entitled "Interventional treatment of coronary artery disease in patients with cardiorenal metabolic syndrome: a differentiated approach to the selection of management strategies", it was submitted in the specialty of cardiovascular surgery (14.01.04).

In 2024, the Ministry of Education and Science of Ukraine awarded him the academic title of senior researcher in medicine (specialty 222). According to his institutional biography, he has authored or co-authored 70 scientific publications and inventions, including 45 articles in specialist journals and two utility model patents. His research interests include coronary artery disease and myocardial revascularisation in patients with disorders of carbohydrate metabolism and cardiorenal metabolic syndrome.

== Awards and honours ==
- Order of Prince Yaroslav the Wise, fifth class (22 January 2026).
- Order of Merit, third class (26 July 2024).
- Honorary title of Honored Doctor of Ukraine (18 June 2021).
- Certificate of Merit (2024) and Honorary Certificate of Merit (2025) of the Verkhovna Rada.
- Departmental awards from the Ministry of Defence, Security Service of Ukraine, State Border Guard Service of Ukraine, National Guard of Ukraine, National Academy of Medical Sciences of Ukraine and other institutions.

== Personal life ==
Mankovskyi is married.
