= Oleksandr Linchevskyi =

Ukrainian thoracic surgeon and government official (born 1975)

Oleksandr Linchevskyy
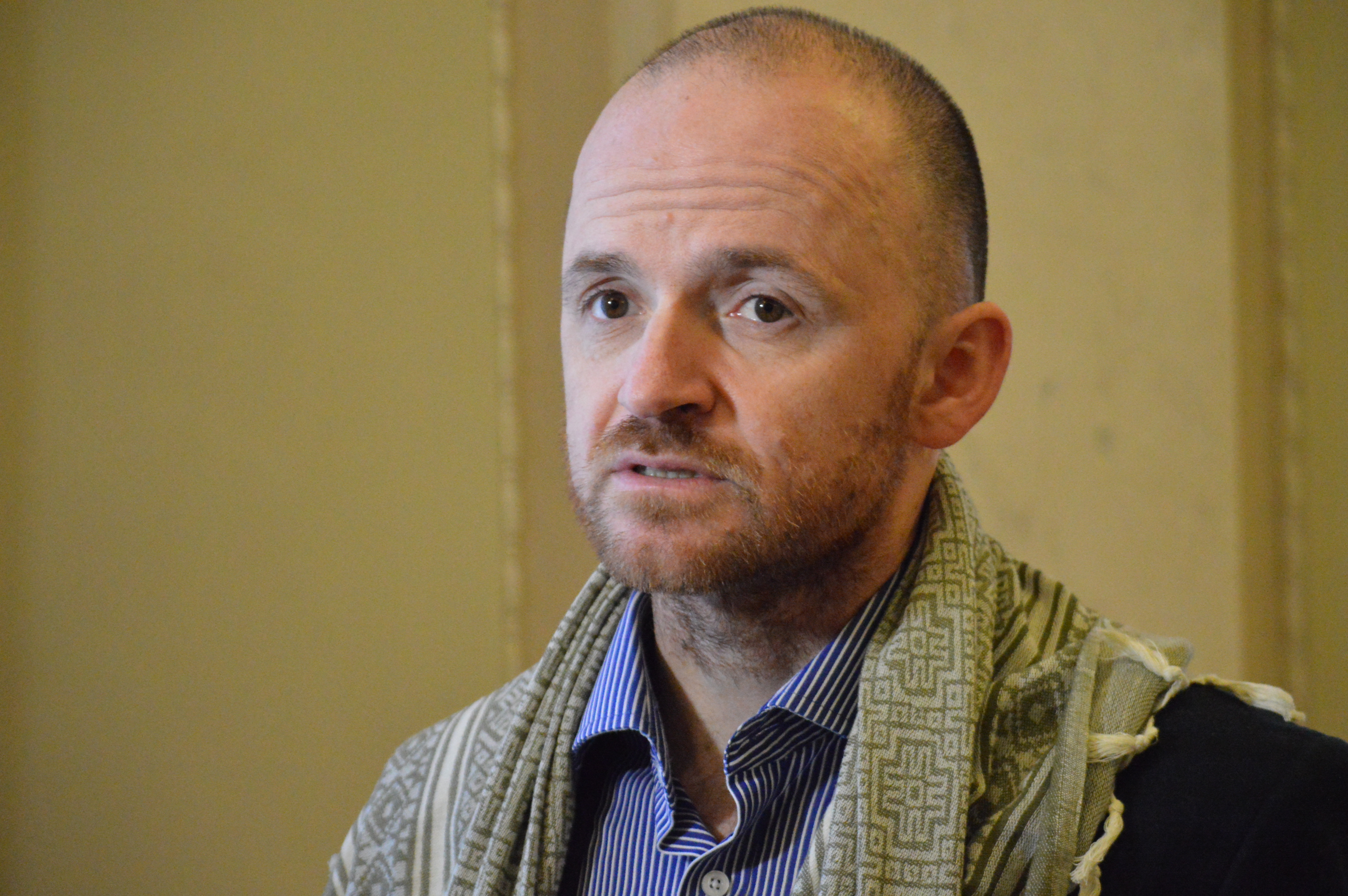
- Born: October 1975 (age 50); Kyiv, Soviet Union
- Occupations: Thoracic surgeon, Former Deputy Minister of Health of Ukraine
- Organization: Minister of Healthcare of Ukraine

Oleksandr Linchevskyy (born October 25, 1975, in Kyiv, Soviet Union) is a Ukrainian thoracic surgeon and former Deputy Minister of Health of Ukraine, First Deputy Director of Medical Centre "Oberig" in Kyiv. At the Ministry of Health, Oleksandr Linchevskyy was responsible for the reform of medical education, introduced the principles of evidence-based medicine in Ukraine, coordinated the work of the Directorate of Medical Services.

== Career ==
1999-2019: thoracic and trauma surgery / departments of general thoracic surgery and polytrauma department of Kyiv Clinical Hospital #17.

1999-2001: general surgery / department of general surgery, City Centre of gastrointestinal bleeding, Clinical Hospital #12 in Kyiv.

2011-2019: assistant professor of the Department of Thoracic Surgery and Pulmonology at the P.L. Shupyk National Medical Academy of Postgraduate Education.

2014-2016: war surgery – Medical director of “Patriot Defence” – tactical medicine training (combat lifesaver courses (CLS), Long range patrol medic courses (LRPM), Safe management and resuscitation of trauma (SMART course for hospital trauma care providers).

2016-2019: as Deputy Minister of Health of Ukraine launched the medical education reform in Ukraine: adopted the Government's Strategy for Medical Education Development, introduced minimal admission requirements to enter medical university, the new independent unified state qualification exam, the system of continuing professional development for healthcare workers; conducted International monitoring and evaluation of the quality of medical education in Ukraine. He also initiated the Ministry's Order that allowed doctors to use evidence-based guidelines from foreign countries in their medical practice. Oleksandr Linchevskyy launched a government program to build a network of cardio centers (regional reperfusion network) and free stenting for acute myocardial infarction.

From 2019: First Deputy Director of Medical Centre "Oberig" in Kyiv.

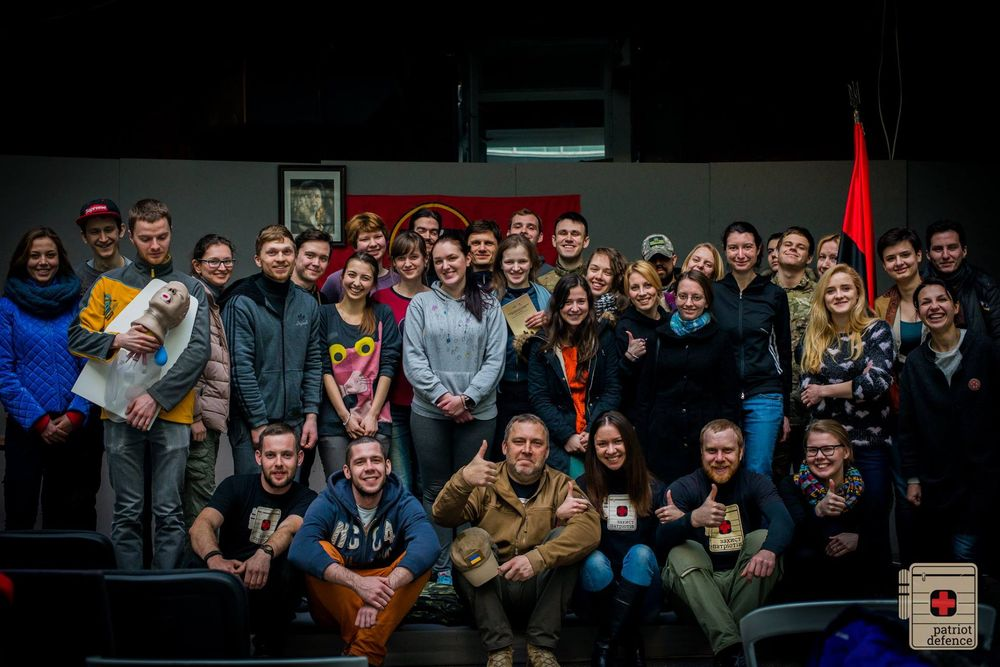
Patriot Defence team. 2015 year, when Oleksandr worked as the medical director.

== Biography and education ==
Oleksandr Linchevskyy was born in Kyiv. From 1990 to1993 he studied at Kyiv Medical College No. 4. From 1993 to 1999 he studied at the Bogomolets National Medical University.

1999-2001: he had been studying at the Internship in Surgery at the P.L. Shupyk National Medical Academy of Postgraduate Education.

2002: Internship in general and thoracic surgery department / University Hospital Centre; Assistant of a surgeon/ general thoracic department, R. Kaswin, Du Pre Clinic. Le Mans, France.

2007: Thoracic course, Level 1, European School for Cardio-Thoracic Surgery. Bergamo, Italy. Oncology training, Laboratories Perouse. Paris, France. Salzburg Weill Cornell seminar in Trauma and Emergency Surgery. Salzburg, Austria.

2008: Thoracic course, Level 2, European School for Cardio-Thoracic Surgery. Bergamo, Italy. ESTS School of Thoracic Surgery, (Theoretical course). Antalya, Turkey.

2009: European Multidisciplinary Conference in Thoracic Oncology. Lugano, Switzerland.

2011: ESTS Fellowship – “Hopital Nord” (Pr. P.Thomas). Marseille, France. ESTS School of Thoracic Surgery, (Practical course). Elancourt, France.

2012: ESTS School of Thoracic Surgery, (Practical course). Elancourt, France. The Salzburg Weill Cornell seminar in Trauma and Emergency Surgery. Salzburg, Austria.

2013: Advanced Course on Thoracoscopic Surgery, IRCAD. Strasbourg, France. 2nd VATS Lobectomy Symposium. Innsbruck, Austria.

2014: Combat Lifesaver (Instructor course). Kyiv, Ukraine. ATLS Provider course. Brighton, United Kingdom.

2015: International Combat Lifesaver course. Wiesbaden, Germany.Combat Support Hospital deployment exercise – observership. Rammstein, Germany.Special Operations Surgical Team Development Course at NATO Special Operations Headquarters, SHAPE, Belgium.

2017: RHCE Spring Medical Surgical CME Training. Munich, Germany.

2018: American Safety & Health Institute Advanced Cardiac Life Support - ASHI ACLS.

2019: WADEM Congress, Brisbane, Australia. 20th European Congress of Trauma & Emergency Surgery, Prague, Czech Republic. WFME World Conference, Seoul, South Korea.

Participant in military operations. "For participation in the anti-terrorist operation" Award of the President of Ukraine. The Order of Courage.
