= Serhiy Kuzminykh =

Ukrainian philanthropist and politician

- Сергій Кузьміних
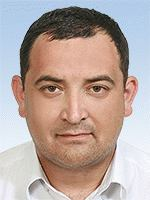
- Official portrait, 2019

People's Deputy of Ukraine
- Incumbent
- Assumed office 29 August 2019
- Preceded by: Viktor Razvadovsky
- Constituency: Zhytomyr Oblast, No. 67

Personal details
- Born: 17 January 1983 (age 43) Zhytomyr, Ukrainian SSR, Soviet Union (now Ukraine)
- Party: Servant of the People
- Other political affiliations: Independent

Serhiy Volodymyrovych Kuzminykh (Ukrainian: Сергій Володимирович Кузьміних; born 17 January 1983) is a Ukrainian philanthropist and politician currently serving as a People's Deputy of Ukraine from Ukraine's 67th electoral district since 29 August 2019.

== Early life and career ==
Serhiy Volodymyrovych Kuzminykh was born on 17 January 1983 in Zhytomyr, within the Ukrainian Soviet Socialist Republic of the Soviet Union. He is a graduate of the Zhytomyr Military Institute, with a specialisation in system engineering. His brother is Oleh Kuzminykh, a member of the Cyborgs that fought at the Second Battle of Donetsk Airport.

Prior to his political career, Kuzminykh was active in charity, founding the International Charitable Foundation of the Kuzminykh Brothers, an organisation dedicated to providing healthcare to wounded veterans of the war in Donbas. Rehabilitation centres of the International Charitable Foundation of the Kuzminykh Brothers were opened in Zhytomyr, Cherkasy, and Kyiv. Kuzminykh was also a member of the Public Council of the Ministry of Health of Ukraine.

== Political career ==
Kuzminykh ran in the 2019 Ukrainian parliamentary election as the candidate of Servant of the People in Ukraine's 67th electoral district. At the time of his campaign, he was an independent. He was ultimately successful, defeating incumbent People's Deputy Viktor Razvadovsky with 36.35% of the vote compared to Razvadovsky's 34.29%. He is a member of the Verkhovna Rada National Health, Healthcare, and Health Insurance Committee, as well as the party faction of Servant of the People within the Verkhovna Rada (Ukraine's parliament).

=== Criminal proceedings ===
On 28 January 2022, it was announced by the National Anti-Corruption Bureau of Ukraine (NABU) that Kuzminykh had been caught accepting a bribe of ₴558,000. Suspilne, Ukraine's public broadcaster, reported that it was connected to the conclusion of contracts between private companies and a hospital in Zhytomyr Oblast. On 1 February 2022, it was additionally stated by NABU's press service that he had ignored three prior subpoenas. Six days later, Kuzminykh was detained by NABU on charges of hiding from law enforcement officers, according to NABU and Kuzminykh's lawyer. However, Kuzminykh denied this, claiming he had turned himself in. However, he still refused to appear before court, leading for the head of the High Anti-Corruption Court, Oleh Tkachenko, to initiate a forced arraignment on 24 February 2022.

On 1 February 2022, prior to his arrest, Kuzminykh requested to Davyd Arakhamia, head of Servant of the People faction in the Verkhovna Rada, that he be removed from the party faction with the possibility of returning if he was found innocent. On 21 February 2022, the party faction began to collect signatures for the removal of both Kuzminykh and Oleksandr Trukhin, who is accused of attempting to bribe police officers following a traffic accident. Kuzminykh has rejected any notion of guilt, and claimed that the charges were motivated by his vote in favour of the dismissal of Zoriana Skaletska, then director of NABU and Minister of Health of Ukraine. His defence lawyer has additionally claimed that his actions fell under the umbrella of his duties as a People's Deputy.
