= Illia Yemets =

Ukrainian physician and politician

- Ілля Ємець
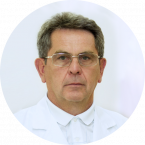

Minister of Healthcare
- In office 4 March 2020 – 30 March 2020
- President: Volodymyr Zelenskyy
- Prime Minister: Denys Shmyhal
- Preceded by: Zoriana Skaletska
- Succeeded by: Maksym Stepanov
- In office 21 December 2010 – 17 May 2011
- President: Viktor Yanukovych
- Prime Minister: Mykola Azarov
- Preceded by: Zynoviy Mytnyk
- Succeeded by: Oleksandr Anishchenko

Personal details
- Born: 21 February 1956 (age 70) Vorkuta, Russian SFSR, Soviet Union (now Russia)
- Party: Ukraine – Forward!
- Education: Kyiv Medical Institute
- Occupation: Physician politician

Illia Mykolayovych Yemets (Ukrainian: Ілля Миколайович Ємець; born 21 February 1956) is a Ukrainian physician and politician and twice appointed Minister of Healthcare.

During his tenure as Minister of Health, Yemets faced strong criticism over controversial statements about elderly people during the COVID-19 pandemic in Ukraine and allegations that he delayed centralized procurement of protective equipment and medicines. In subsequent years, he became the subject of journalistic investigations concerning his wealth, financial declarations, acquisition of real estate abroad during the Russian invasion of Ukraine, and possible conflicts of interest. In 2026, Yemets became the subject of further public controversies involving allegations of sexual harassment of female employees, as well as media reports regarding his departure from Ukraine at the beginning of the Russian invasion of Ukraine and his family’s assets.

== Biography ==
In 1979, he graduated from the Kyiv Medical Institute with a degree in Pediatrics. Doctor of Medical Sciences, professor.

From 1985 to 2003, Yemets worked as a pediatric heart surgeon and was the head of the department at the Institute of Cardiovascular Surgery of the Academy of Medical Sciences.

In 2003, he was appointed director of the State Institution "Scientific and Practical Medical Center for Pediatric Cardiology and Cardiac Surgery of the Ministry of Healthcare."

From December 2010 to May 2011, Yemets served as Minister of Healthcare.

On 4 March 2020 Yemets was again appointed Minister of Healthcare. Ukraine's Parliament dismissed him on 30 March 2020.

Honored Doctor of Ukraine. Laureate of the State Prize in Science and Technology.

== Criticism ==
Yemets was repeatedly criticized during his tenure as Minister of Health of Ukraine in March 2020, particularly for his public statements and actions (or alleged inaction) during the early stage of the COVID-19 pandemic in Ukraine.

=== Statements about elderly people ===
During a meeting of the Verkhovna Rada Committee on Public Health, Yemets stated that “all pensioners will die” from COVID-19.

The statement caused widespread public attention and criticism.

Particular outrage was sparked by comments he made during the television program Velyke Interv’yu (“The Big Interview”) on the pro-Russian television channel 112 Ukraine, owned by Viktor Medvedchuk, a political ally of Russian President Vladimir Putin.

Yemets urged businesses and financiers to support younger Ukrainians in combating the virus rather than spending money on treating people over the age of 65. He stated that the average life expectancy of Ukrainian men was approximately 65 years and called for authorities to “calculate how much funding should be allocated to living people, not corpses”.

These remarks were widely criticized by the public, activists and politicians. Anti-corruption activist Oleksandr Liemienov described the statements as “disgusting” and suggested adding the then 64-year-old minister himself to the list of people who should not be treated. Yemets was also criticized by members of the Servant of the People parliamentary faction and the Office of the President of Ukraine, who argued that his communication fueled panic instead of informing the public.

Former acting Minister of Health Ulana Suprun responded by stating that no other country had experienced 100% mortality among elderly COVID-19 patients, contradicting Yemets’ remarks.

=== Procurement during the COVID-19 pandemic ===
Yemets was accused of significantly delaying centralized procurement of personal protective equipment, COVID-19 tests and other medical equipment during the early stages of the epidemic.

On 19 February 2020, before any cases of COVID-19 had been officially recorded in Ukraine, the government allocated UAH 67 million for emergency procurement. However, the agreement with Crown Agents Ukraine was signed only on 26 March 2020, more than five weeks later. During this period, doctors reportedly had to purchase protective equipment themselves, while local authorities, businesses and volunteers partially covered the shortages.

Holos MP Oleksandra Ustinova accused Yemets of deliberately delaying the signing of the contract for three weeks because he wanted to appoint “his own supervisor” to oversee procurement for possible personal enrichment. According to Ustinova, while centralized procurement was blocked, local governments had to spend money from their own budgets.

Arsen Zhumadilov, Director General of the state enterprise Medical Procurement of Ukraine, publicly accused Yemets of blocking the procurement of medicines worth approximately UAH 10 billion, including drugs for cancer, tuberculosis and HIV patients. Zhumadilov claimed that the conflict arose after he refused to appoint a person trusted by the minister as his deputy, alleging that the individual had a criminal record. Former acting Health Minister Ulana Suprun also supported these allegations.

The dispute resulted in police investigations involving Zhumadilov, which critics described as pressure against him. In response, Yemets initiated an internal investigation.

These controversies became one of the main reasons for Yemets’ rapid dismissal at the end of March 2020 after serving as minister for approximately four weeks.

=== Criticism of management of the Children’s Cardiology Center ===
After Ilya Yemets was dismissed from the position of director of the Scientific and Practical Medical Center for Pediatric Cardiology and Cardiac Surgery of the Ministry of Health of Ukraine in 2025–2026, new materials appeared in the media regarding the management of the institution during his leadership. According to the investigation, during the full-scale Russian invasion of Ukraine, part of the equipment and patients were evacuated to Lviv.

However, after the return, questions arose about exactly what equipment was taken out, what was returned to the center, and why some of the equipment had not been used for its intended purpose for a long time. In particular, the angiographic X-ray system Siemens Artis zee ceiling (manufactured in 2019, original cost — ₴32.3 million, residual value — over ₴21.5 million), which only in 2026 was being prepared for transfer to the balance sheet of another medical facility in Kramatorsk, was mentioned.

It was also reported that a significant amount of equipment was transferred to other institutions: 33 units to the Odesa National Medical University (worth over ₴8.69 million) and 5 units to Okhmatdyt (worth over ₴9.25 million). The authors of the material raise questions about the effectiveness of management decisions and responsibility for the downtime of expensive equipment.

In addition, sources of the publication claim that after the change in leadership, Yemets’ former team allegedly tried to maintain influence on the processes in the center, spread disinformation among patients, and resisted reforms.

== Journalistic investigations ==
Illia Yemets has repeatedly been mentioned in journalistic investigations concerning his wealth, financial declarations, family business, and activities while serving as Minister of Health.

=== Family wealth and financial declarations ===
In 2020, shortly before being appointed Minister of Health, Yemets purchased a mansion in Kozyn, Kyiv Oblast, with an area of more than 400 m² together with a land plot for approximately UAH 12.5 million. According to his financial declaration, the funds were obtained as a loan from the co-owners of the Salcom law firm. Journalists questioned whether such a loan could realistically be repaid in light of Yemets’ officially declared income, which had amounted to approximately UAH 2 million over the preceding years.

A 2020 investigation by Slidstvo.Info reported that Yemets’ family owned substantial assets. His son, Hlib Yemets, received an apartment in Kyiv and apartments in Bukovel as gifts from his grandmother, who was nearly 90 years old at the time, and also became a co-owner of a hotel complex through the company Prymula Resort. Journalists identified his business partner as Vasyl Chudnov, former head of the Ivano-Frankivsk Oblast State Administration during the presidency of Viktor Yanukovych.

In 2022, Yemets declared record income exceeding UAH 13.7 million, a significant portion of which consisted of fees paid by the Georgian company Max Express LLC.

During the Russian invasion of Ukraine, between 2023 and 2025, Yemets declared the purchase of a residential house in Greece (273 m² with a land plot of more than 4,000 m²), substantial “gifts” from family members (nearly UAH 1.9 million in 2023), and the use of a 2022 Lexus LX 500D provided through the Children’s Heart charitable foundation, which had been established on his initiative. His wife declared significant foreign currency savings despite reporting only minimal official income. Journalists drew attention to what they described as possible inconsistencies between the family’s declared income and assets.

In addition, according to journalists, during the war Yemets’ son purchased real estate in Odesa and a 2025 Subaru Outback valued at approximately $50,000.

=== Sexual harassment allegations ===
In June 2026, Illia Yemets became the subject of a public controversy following allegations of sexual harassment involving female employees of a medical institution.

On 13 June 2026, the anti-corruption outlet StopCor reported that the Telegram channel Harley Quinn had published video footage which, according to the publication, originated from surveillance cameras. One video allegedly shows a man resembling Yemets embracing and kissing a woman. Another reportedly shows conduct that the publication characterized as inappropriate toward a subordinate.

According to the investigation, Yemets allegedly used his official position over an extended period of time—including influence over work schedules, vacations, days off, and personnel decisions—to pressure female subordinates into unwanted contact. The report further alleged that women who refused such advances faced unfavorable working conditions. It also stated that one employee had been left in a severe psychological condition.

=== Departure from Ukraine and alleged ties to Russia ===
In June 2026, journalists published new allegations concerning Illia Yemets regarding his reported departure from Ukraine shortly before the beginning of the Russian invasion of Ukraine on 24 February 2022 and his family’s alleged connections to Russia.

According to UNIAN, Yemets, who at the time headed the Scientific and Practical Medical Center of Pediatric Cardiology and Cardiac Surgery of the Ministry of Health of Ukraine, left Ukraine four days before the start of the invasion, leaving the institution and its patients behind, and remained abroad while Kyiv was under threat. The publication reported that he later returned to Ukraine. As of the publication of the report, there had been no official confirmation of these allegations.

The publication also drew attention to members of Yemets’ family. According to the report, his son, while employed in public service, maintained his social media accounts in the Russian language. Yemets’ wife, Oleksandra Telehuzova, a physician, was reported to have studied at a university in Moscow. The report also noted that Telehuzova’s father had previously appeared in media reports in connection with his detention on suspicion of accepting a bribe of UAH 2.5 million.

== See also ==
- First Azarov government
- Shmyhal Government
