= National Health Service of Ukraine =

Government agency of Ukraine

Coordinates: 50.4901830°N 30.4917253°E

- Національна служба здоров'я України

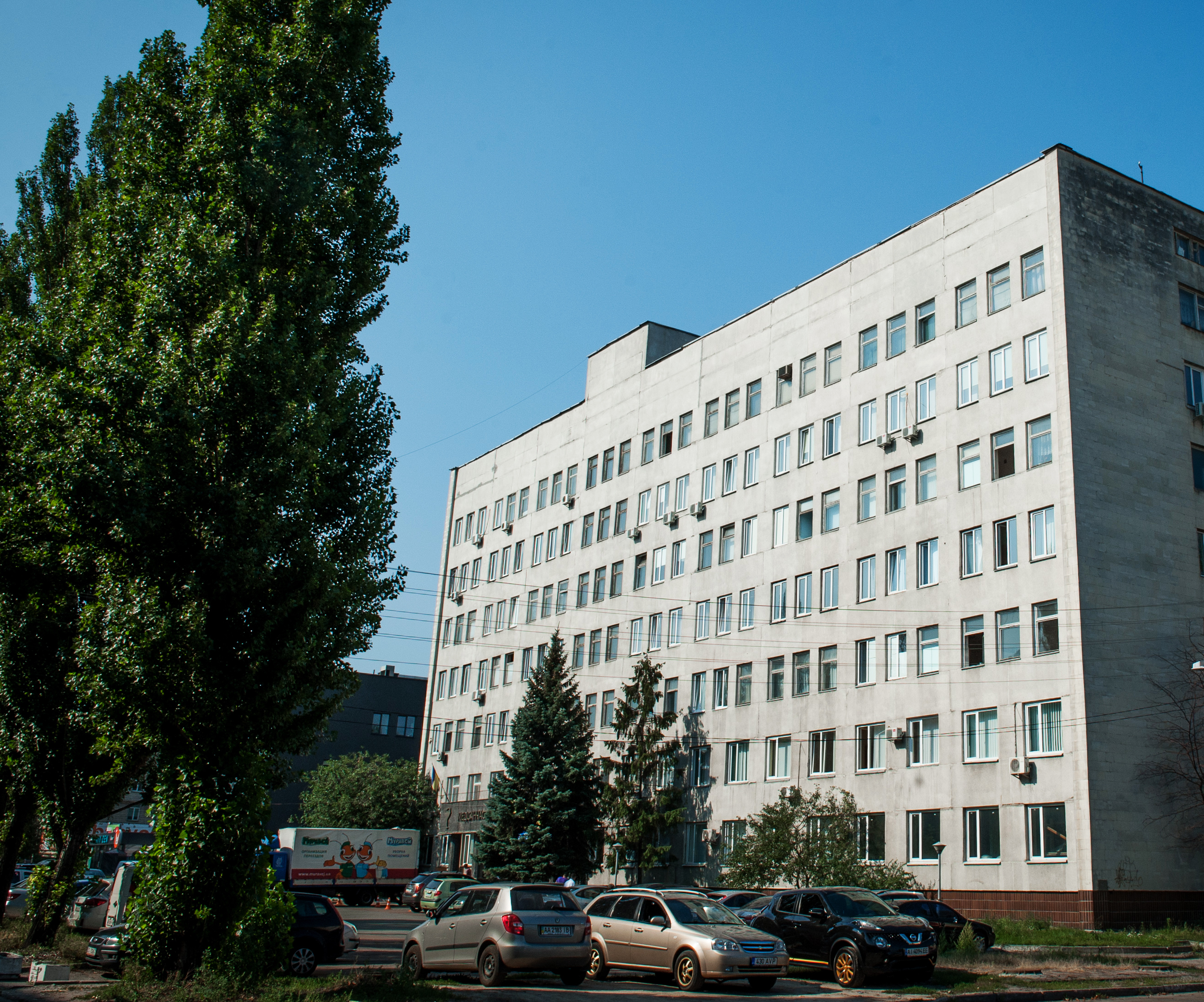

Agency overview
- Formed: 27 December 2017
- Preceding agency: State Treasury of Ukraine
- Jurisdiction: Government of Ukraine
- Headquarters: Kyiv, Ukraine
- Employees: 1,060
- Annual budget: ₴142,928,785,000
- Agency executive: Natalia Husak
- Parent agency: Ministry of Health

National Health Service of Ukraine (Ukrainian: Національна служба здоров'я України, romanized: Natsionalna sluzhba zdorovia Ukrainy; abbrev: Ukrainian: НСЗУ, lit. 'NSZU', English: NHSU) is the central body of the executive power, which implements state policy in the field of state financial guarantees of medical care for the population under the program of medical guarantees. NHSU is a national insurer that concludes contracts with health care institutions and purchases medical services from them. Additionally, it monitors compliance with the terms of contracts and makes direct payments to institutions for services provided.

== Tasks ==
Under the medical guarantee policy, the NHSU serves as the single national consumer of drugs and medical services. The money it uses to pay for medical services on behalf of the state (more than 100 billion hryvnias annually) is maintained in treasury accounts. The service neither owns nor oversees any healthcare facilities (the principle of separation of functions of the customer and the provider of medical services). In accordance with the law, the main tasks of NHSU are:

- Implementation of state policy in the field of state financial guarantees of medical care of the population under the program of medical guarantees
- Monitoring, analysis and forecasting of the needs of the population of Ukraine in medical services and medicines
- Performing the functions of the customer of medical services and medicines under the medical guarantee program
- Development of the project of the medical guarantee program, introduction of proposals on tariffs
- Concluding, changing and terminating contracts on medical care of the population and contracts on reimbursement
- Verification of compliance by medical service providers with the requirements established by the procedure for the use of funds of the medical guarantee program and contracts on medical care of the population
- Ensuring the functioning of eHealth, an electronic health care system.

NSHU is an organization recognized by public law. To ensure openness and public oversight of the Service's operations, the Council of Public Control is contemplated.

== History ==
Ulana Suprun, Ukraine's acting minister of health, has been implementing medical reform since 2016. The Law "On State Financial Guarantees of Medical Services of the People", which was based on the new Concept of Health Care Funding Reform, was approved by the Verkhovna Rada on 19 October 2017, and it went into effect on 30 January 2018. One of the main components of the health care finance reform is handled by a new organization called the National Health Service of Ukraine.

On 27 December 2017, the Cabinet of Ministers approved the creation of the service and its regulations. The election to lead the NHSU was won on 27 February 2018, by Oleg Petrenko, the deputy director of a private Kyiv clinic. He was chosen for the position by the Cabinet of Ministers on 28 March. On 30 March 2018, NHSU was registered with the Ministry of Justice.

== Structure ==
=== Divisions ===
In order to improve the NHSU's functioning in the regions, regional divisions without the legal status of an entity are scheduled to open in 2019:

City	Name	Oblasts
Kyiv	Central Interregional Department	Kyiv; Zhytomyr; Vinnytsia; Cherkassy
Odesa	Southern Interregional Department	Odesa; Kherson; Mykolaiv; Crimea
Dnipro	Eastern Interregional Department	Dnipro; Donetsk; Luhansk; Zaporizhzhia; Kirovohrad
Kharkiv	Northern Interregional Department	Kharkiv; Chernihiv; Sumy; Poltava
Lviv	Western Interregional Department	Lviv; Rivne; Ternopil; Volyn; Khmelnytskyi; Ivano-Frankivsk; Zakarpattia; Chernivtsi

=== Management ===
The initial head of the Service was Oleg Petrenko (from 28 March 2018 to 4 December 2019). Natalia Ryabtseva and Oksana Movchan served as his deputies. After the Health Minister was replaced, Petrenko filed a request for dismissal, which the Government accepted on 4 December 2019. Oksana Movchan is in charge of temporarily carrying out duties. The cap on staff is established at 1,060 individuals, with 250 working in the central office and 810 in territorial organizations.

== Activities ==
The NHSU released its first notice regarding the completion of contracts with healthcare organizations at the end of May 2018, marking the start of the so-called "first wave" of contract signing with primary care organizations. According to its findings, since July, 149 primary care medical facilities, 7 private medical facilities, and 7 doctors who are also businesses have shifted to the new method of financing. At the Kaluga hospital, where declarations were made outside of the electronic system and without patient signatures, payments under the new order were first suspended in July 2018. A later incident of widespread declaration falsification occurred at the Irpin primary healthcare center. On July 25, the second round of contract signing was announced. It continued until August 15. Contracts were signed as a result with 33 FOP doctors, 40 private institutions, and 389 communally owned institutions. The third wave lasted from 26 November to 20 December 2018. As of 10 September 2018, the NHSU paid out ₴809.9 million to health care institutions, and at the end of the year with ₴3.5 billion.

A trial program for the new model of paying for patient care in inpatient departments, which will be implemented across all of Ukraine, was started in the Poltava Oblast on 1 April 2019. It will be a test project till the end of 2019. The core of the new approach is paying institutions for specific patient hospitalization and treatment cases rather than paying for "bed-places." The NHSU will get accurate data on the volume and makeup of hospitalizations by developing a new funding model. As of 1 July 2019, 54 diagnostic and treatment services were supposed to be paid for. The program includes 12 different tests, mammography, 5 types of x-rays, 4 types of biopsies under ultrasound control, removal of neoplasms, as well as endoscopic examinations and same-day operations. However, the implementation of this program called "Free diagnostics" was delayed due to the technological unreadiness of institutions of various levels. Additionally being implemented in 2019 are an electronic medical card and an electronic prescription. The country's first automated data exchange using the Trembita system between the National Health Service and the State Service for Medicines and Drug Control went live in May 2019.

The medical guarantee program for 2020 offers financing for pregnancy, cancer early detection, and other medical expenses. The annual program has been given a budget of ₴72 billion, or 64% of the total budget for the medical sector. The Medical Guarantee Program will now cover all forms of care, including primary, specialist, highly specialized, emergency, palliative, medical rehabilitation, and drug reimbursement, as part of the second phase of the health care system's restructuring, which began on 1 April 2020. The state will pay for the services through NSHU.

== See also ==
- Health in Ukraine
