= Ukrainian profanity =

Strong obscene profanity in Ukrainian

Ukrainian profanities (Ukrainian: лайливі слова, romanized: lailyvi slova) are words and expressions that are considered improper or even rude in everyday language. Like many other languages, the profanities in Ukrainian are also based on sexuality or the human body. Unlike the Russian profanities, the ones in Ukrainian tend to lean on the human body.

== History ==
For the most part, the Ukrainian profanities come from the same stem as Russian. This is dues to the fact the two are very closely related languages. Some of the Ukrainian profanities come from the Polish language. Under Russian rule, there were strict rules in order to restrict the use of swearing. These restrictions were eased up, first in the 1960s as the illegal literature became more widespread, and later during the 1990s when the overall censorship became less prevalent.

In 2019 the Ukrainian parliament started debating a bill that would make it illegal for public figures to use profanities in the media under penalty of a fine. Ukraine's then acting minister of public health Ulana Suprun was against this and said that swearing is not harmful.

After Russia's full-scale invasion of Ukraine in 2022, the usage of profanities has become more and more acceptable in Ukraine, and the country has distanced itself from the linguistic puritanism that comes from Russia. An example of this was when president Volodymyr Zelenskyy used informal you when addressing Putin directly.

== Selection of profanities ==
Profanities that correspond to the word ‘ass’ include hepa (гепа), mandryka (мандрика), huzno (гузно), sraka (срака).

=== Haspyd ===
Haspyd (гаспид) can be translated as ‘devil’ and ‘damn’ but also as ‘snake’ or ‘lizard’.

=== Kurva ===
Kurva (курва; Polish: Kurwa) is a Polish loan word and can mean both ‘shit’ and ‘whore’.

=== Pohan ===
Pohan (погань) means a morally lowly or classless person, often criminals. A variant of this is pokydky (покидьки).

=== Durbelyk ===
Durbelyk (дурбелик) can be translated as ‘fool’. A variant of this is lokh (лох).

=== Blyat ===
Blyat (Блять) translated means both 'shit' and whore's. A variant/used with Kurva.

=== Suka ===
Suka (Сука) means 'bitch' or a female pupil. Similar to Blyad' (blyat) and Kurva.

=== Yibaty ===
Yibaty (Їбати) translated to 'to fuck'; Used for aggressive phrases such as "їбати в рот" (to fuck in the mouth).
