= State Service for Medications and Drugs Control =

State Drugs and Medications Control Service State Narco-control

Agency overview
- Formed: September 10, 2014
- Preceding agency: State Service for the Control of the Circulation of Narcotics

Jurisdictional structure
- Operations jurisdiction: UKR
- Legal jurisdiction: Ukraine
- Governing body: Ministry of Healthcare

Operational structure
- Headquarters: Kyiv, Ukraine

Notables
- Programme: Drugs regulation and Law Enforcement

Website
- narko.gov.ua

The State Drugs and Medications Control Service (Ukrainian: Державна служба України з лікарських засобів та контролю за наркотиками, romanized: Derzhavna sluzhba Ukrainy z likarskykh zasobiv ta kontroliu za narkotykamy) is a national law enforcement agency of executive authority in Ukraine responsible for drafting state policy, legal regulation, control and monitoring in combating trafficking drugs, psychotropic substances, medications and their precursors. The Service is specially authorized to address and solve problems relating to traffic in narcotic drugs, psychotropic substances, and their precursors; the Service is also authorized to combat the illicit drug trafficking. Commonly was known as The Drugs Control Service (Derzhavna Sluzhba Narcocontrolya).

The Service was formed on September 10, 2014 by Cabinet Resolution No. 442 by the merge of the State Service for Drugs Control (Державна слу́жба Украї́ни з контро́лю за нарко́тиками) and the State Service of Medicines (Державна служба України з лікарських засобів).

The service is formed for implementation of state policy in the areas of:

- quality and safety of medical products, including medical immuno-biological drugs, medical equipment and medical products that are in circulation and / or used in the health sector, approved for implementation in pharmacy institutions and their structural units;
- licensing of economic activities for the production of drugs, importing drugs, wholesale and retail sale of medicines;
- trafficking in narcotic drugs, psychotropic substances, their analogues and precursors, combating illicit trafficking.

The activities of this body is directed and coordinated by the Cabinet of Ministers of Ukraine, directly and through the Minister of Healthcare.

== See also ==
- Main Directorate for Drugs Control, the Russian equivalent, successor of Federal Drugs Control Agency
- DEA, the US counterpart
- United Nations Office on Drugs and Crime
- Anti-Narcotics Force
