= Zoriana Skaletska =

Ukrainian politician

- Зоряна Скалецька
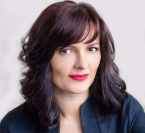

20th Minister of Healthcare of Ukraine
- In office 29 August 2019 – 4 March 2020
- President: Volodymyr Zelenskyy
- Prime Minister: Oleksiy Honcharuk
- Preceded by: Ulana Suprun (Acting)
- Succeeded by: Illia Yemets

Personal details
- Born: Zoriana Stepanivna Skaletska; 9 August 1980 (age 46) Lviv, Ukrainian SSR, Soviet Union
- Party: Servant of the People
- Education: National University of Kyiv-Mohyla Academy; Maria Curie-Skłodowska University
- Occupation: lawyer activist politician

Zoriana Stepanivna Skaletska (Ukrainian: Зоряна Степанівна Скалецька, née Chernenko (Черненко); born 9 August 1980) is a Ukrainian lawyer, activist and politician and former Minister of Healthcare of Ukraine.

== Biography ==
Skaletska graduated from the National University of Kyiv-Mohyla Academy (2002). She studied at the Maria Curie-Skłodowska University (2002–2006), Doctor of Law.

Skaletska taught law at the National University of Kyiv-Mohyla Academy.

Skaletska is an expert in the Reanimation Reform Package organization. She was also an expert at the Center for Support of Reforms under the Cabinet of Ministers. Skaletska is the director of the public organization "Health Forum" and a member of the World Association of Medical Law.

On 29 August 2019, Skaletska was appointed the Minister of Healthcare of Ukraine in the Honcharuk Government. According to Ukrayinska Pravda, President Volodymyr Zelenskyy continued to hold interviews with candidates for Minister of Healthcare on 29 August 2019, the same day the Honcharuk Government was appointed with Skaletska being appointed Minister of Healthcare. On 31 August 2019, Servant of the People faction leader Davyd Arakhamia stated on ZIK channel that most likely (Healthcare Minister) Skaletska, would be replaced by Mykhailo Radutskyi (who according to Arakhamia needed "about three months to prepare" for the post).

On 4 March 2020 the Honcharuk Government was replaced by the Shmyhal Government in which Illia Yemets replaced Skaletska as Minister of Healthcare.

Skaletska is a candidate (number 10 on the election list) for the Kyiv City Council of the party Servant of the People in the 2020 Kyiv local election set for 25 October 2020.

Skaletska is the former wife of Oleksandr Chernenko, a former MP for the Petro Poroshenko Bloc. Chairman of the Board of the Ukrainian Medical-Legal Association, member of the Board of the Ukrainian League for the Promotion of Palliative and Hospice Care, Director of the Health Forum and member of the World Association of Medical Law.
