= HeRAMS =

Electronic system for monitoring medical resources

Health Resources Availability Mapping System

General information
- Abbreviation: HeRAMS
- Type: Monitoring program
- Field: Emergency medicine, Public Health

Organization
- Organizer: WHO
- Co-organizer (s): Local Ministries of Health

Locations and dates
- Sudan: 2008 — 2011
- Mali: 2013
- Philippines: 2014
- CAR: 2014, 2016
- Syria: 2014, 2015
- Fiji: 2016
- Nigeria: 2016
- Yemen: 2016
- Iraq: 2017
- Ukraine: 2017 — 2018

HeRAMS (Health Resources Availability Mapping System) is an electronic system for monitoring medical resources, a WHO tool for standardizing and assessing the availability of medical services, mostly used for emergency response. This method to date has mostly been implemented as cross-sectional surveys, but should instead be used as a real-time monitoring system. Acute and protracted crises have grave immediate and long-term effects on population health and health systems, which is particularly evident in low-income countries. Assessing the availability of health services is essential in understanding the disrupted health systems' capacities and weaknesses. HeRAMS enables health sector stakeholders to make managerial decisions and to implement effective planning in the field of health care in time, especially crucial during humanitarian emergencies or healthcare optimization. These decisions save lives and reduce suffering, especially in response to emergencies. Health sector evaluations assessing the effectiveness and applicability of HeRAMS were conducted in Sudan, Mali, Philippines, Central African Republic, Syria, Fiji, Nigeria, Yemen, Iraq and Ukraine.

== General information ==
The need to identify the right investments in health development, corresponding with public health demands is one of the most pressing global public health challenges. The significant gaps in the availability of essential health information still existed in recent, large, armed conflicts and natural disasters. HeRAMS was developed by WHO and the Global Health Cluster (the humanitarian cluster approach is the main coordination mechanism for crises: in the case of crises usually one humanitarian cluster is activated for each sector of the response — eg, nutrition, health or WASH).

When conducting programs using HeRAMS, information is collected about each health facility in a specific area. Then the analysis of the received data is carried out. Updating and georeferencing the database of health facilities in the crisis-affected area is a key step in HeRAMS implementation. It should arguably be done as part of emergency preparedness. It is also needed for health management information systems.

HeRAMS data need to be updated a few times. These information will provide a guide to the progress of reconstruction and revitalization of health facilities.

Based on the findings, WHO, in collaboration with local health ministries, makes analytical reports and develops possible measures to improve the situation. The approach allows to display data on a geographic background. This visualization helps to better understand the situation. It is possible to find the gaps in the medical system that are invisible under the usual approach. Such an opportunity to show a deep understanding of the state of affairs promotes effective communication with stakeholders.

== HeRAMS in Nigeria ==
With the Boko Haram insurgency and the later activation of the conflict in 2013, the humanitarian crisis has been continuing in the northeast part of Nigeria since then. In 2016 WHO started initial assessments in Borno State with local Ministry of Health. Previously HeRAMS has been conducted in Adamawa and Yobe states. WHO planned to update the HeRAMS data three times in 2017/8 across these tree states. This information will lead to a more effective recovery of the medical infrastructure.

In 2017 in Adamawa 1120 health facilities were assessed, which included 1 tertiary and 28 secondary hospitals, 363 primary health care centers and 336 primary health care clinics. 12% of them were completely destroyed, 34% – partially damaged and 54% – not damaged. 20% of the 379 partially damaged facilities were fully functional, 63% were partially functional, and 16% were non-functional.

The Yobe State survey, conducted in 593 health facilities, including 2 tertiary hospitals, 16 secondary ones and 113 primary health care centers, showed that 10% of them were completely destroyed. 70% of the partially damaged (183) and undamaged (347) facilities were fully functional and 17% were partially functional.

The worst situation was in Borno State. According to HeRAMS findings on 2017 about 35% of the 743 health facilities were completely destroyed, about 30% were partially damaged. Significant water supply problems were also identified: three-fourths of facilities did not have a sufficient number of appropriate disinfectants, more than half did not have safe water access.

== HeRAMS in Yemen ==
Yemen is in ongoing conflict that began in 2015 HeRAMS assessment in 2016 covered 3,507 facilities in 16 governorates. 45% of the surveyed health facilities were fully functional.

== HeRAMS in Iraq ==
During Mosul crisis in 2017 five teams from Ninewa Directorate of Health were selected from east Mosul, Qayara and Al-Hamdaniya districts. They were trained on HeRAMS for assessing availability of medical resources and services in the healthcare facilities within the area of their origin.

253 healthcare facilities were surveyed. According to collected data, published in analytical report in 2018, 14% of health houses, 22% of primary health care centres and 48% of referral hospitals were not-functioning. But all 5 field hospitals were fully functioning and most of mobile medical clinic were fully or partially functioning.

== HeRAMS in Ukraine ==
In response to prolonged military intervention, in Ukraine a new Ministry of Temporarily Occupied Territories was founded and central units of the executive branch of Ukraine created relevant divisions. In the Ministry of Social Policy operates Divilion for social adaptation of ATO participants and retired servicemen, in the Ministry of Health – Division of coordination and providing medical care during anti-terrorist operations, emergency and martial law.

In cooperation with it World Health Organization launched the HeRAMS Ukraine project in 2017. Primarily initial assessment was conducted only on the territory of Donetsk and Luhansk regions.
