= Viktor Razvadovskyi =

Ukrainian politician and police officer

Viktor Razvadovsky
- Віктор Развадовський
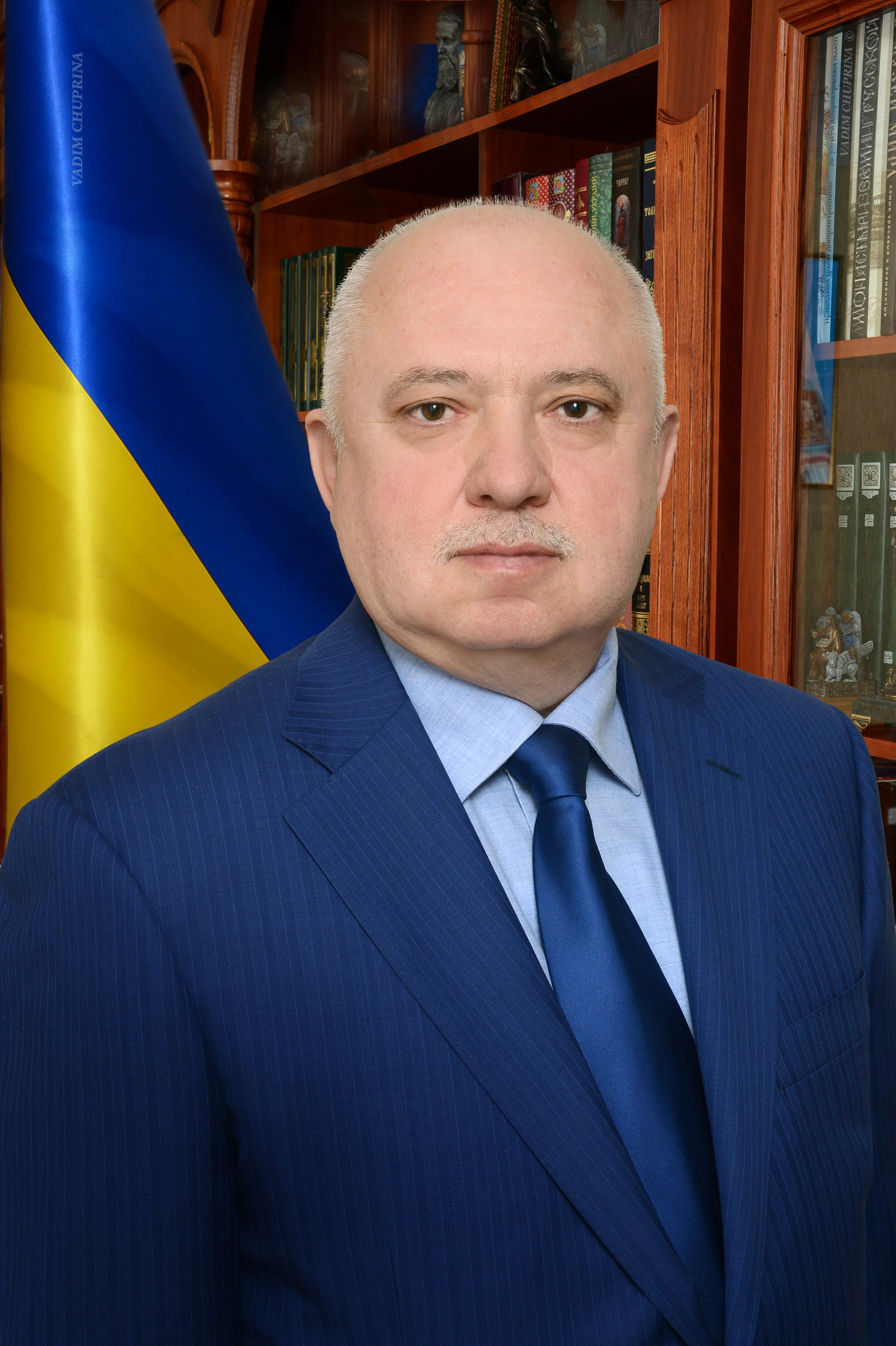

People's Deputy of Ukraine
- In office 12 December 2012 – 29 August 2019
- Preceded by: Constituency re-established
- Succeeded by: Serhiy Kuzminykh
- Constituency: Zhytomyr Oblast, No. 67
- In office 29 March 1998 – 26 March 2006
- Preceded by: Serhiy Melnyk
- Succeeded by: Constituency abolished
- Constituency: Zhytomyr Oblast, No. 69

Personal details
- Born: 3 June 1959 (age 67) Dzerzhynsk, Ukrainian SSR, Soviet Union (now Romaniv, Ukraine)
- Party: Independent
- Education: Taras Shevchenko National University of Kyiv

Military service
- Allegiance: Soviet Union
- Battles/wars: Soviet–Afghan War

Viktor Yosypovych Razvadovsky (Ukrainian: Віктор Йосипович Развадовський; born 3 June 1959) is a Ukrainian politician and police officer who served as a People's Deputy of Ukraine from 29 March 1998 to 26 March 2006 and then again from 12 December 2012 to 29 August 2019. General-colonel of police, Doctor of Law Science, professor, Honoured Lawyer of Ukraine.

== Education ==
Taras Shevchenko National University of Kyiv (1983—1989), a lawyer; postgraduate department there (1989—1992) PhD thesis «Administrative responsibility for breaker of norms, rules and standards providing traffic safety»

- National University “Odesa Academy of Law”, (1998) Doctor of Science thesis «State regulation of Ukrainian transport system (administrative-law problems and the ways of their solving)»
- National Academy of Internal Affairs of Ukraine, 2004).

== Working activity ==
- November 1977 — September 1987 — service in the army
- September 1987 — June 1988 — state traffic control police inspector
- June 1988 — February 1989 — inspector
- February — July 1989 — chief inspector
- July, 1989 — July 1991 — a deputy chief
- July, 1991— July 1992 — a chief of Road Patrol Service Department
- July, 1992 — March 1995 — a deputy chief of Administration of State Traffic Police of Ukraine in Kyiv
- March — July 1995 — a deputy chief of administration of public order maintenance of the Head Office of the Ministry of Internal Affairs of Ukraine in Kyiv.
- July 1995 — December 1996 — a deputy chief of administration of State Traffic Police of the Head Office of the Ministry of Internal Affairs of Ukraine in Kyiv.
- December 1996 — March 1998 — a deputy chief,
- March — May 1998 — the first a deputy chief of the Main Tax Militia Administration of the State Tax Administration of Ukraine.
- August — September 2006 — a deputy chief of Information Defense Department,
- September — October 2006 — a deputy chief of Law Department of the State Tax Administration of Ukraine.
- October 2006 — April 2007 — Ukraine's МВД Minister's consultant on cooperation with the Bodies of State Power.
- April 2007 — June 2008 — consultant of the Chairman of State Tax Administration of Ukraine.
- July 2008 — September 2009 — the chief of the Ministry of Internal Affairs of Ukraine in Kharkiv Oblast.
- Since September 2009 — the chief of Transit Polite Department of the Ministry of Internal Affairs of Ukraine.

== Participant ==
- Combat veteran in Afghanistan.
- Post-accident clean-up participant in Chernobyl Nuclear Power Plant.

== Public-political activity ==
- People's Deputy of Ukraine of the IIIrd convocation since March 1998 to April 2002, election district No. 69, Zhytomyr Oblast. During elections: a chief deputy of the Main Tax Militia Administration of the State Tax Administration of Ukraine, non-party. A chief deputy of the committee on legal support and control over the activity of special bodies in the sphere of corruption prevention and counteraction (July 1998 — February 2000), a deputy chief of the Committee on Corruption Prevention and Counteraction (since February 2000).
- People's Deputy of Ukraine of the IVth convocation since April 2002 to April 2006, election district No. 69, Zhytomyr Oblast, self-nomination. A chairman of subcommittee on legal support and control over the activity of special bodies in the sphere of corruption prevention and counteraction on the control on secret expenses and cooperation with Audit Chamber of the committee on corruption prevention and counteraction (since June, 2002).
- People's deputy of Ukraine of the VIIth convocation since December 2012, election district No. 67, Zhytomyr Oblast, self-nomination. During the elections: a chief of Department of transit police МВД of Ukraine, non-party.
- People's deputy of Ukraine of the VIII convocation. Since October 2014, a deputy in election district No. 67, Zhytomyr Oblast, a self-nominated candidate. Having been elected the deputy, participated a deputy group «People’s Will».

== Honours ==
- Honoured Lawyer of Ukraine (July 1997).
- General-colonel.
- 20 state awards, including Certificate of the Presidium of the Supreme Soviet of the USSR . Certificate of Honour of Cabinet of Ministers of Ukraine. Certificate of Honour of the Verkhovna Rada of Ukraine. Order «For Courage» III stage. Danylo Galitsky Order.
- 6 awards of the Ukrainian Orthodox Church of Moscow Patriarchy.

== Family ==
- Daughter Margaryta (1981)
- Grandsons Arthur, Victor
