= Healthcare in Ukraine =

National Health Service of Ukraine

Healthcare in Ukraine is part of a universal health care system largely built up as a successor of the Soviet healthcare system otherwise dismantled in 1991. The Ministry of Healthcare implements the state policy in the country in the field of medicine and healthcare.

== History ==
As of March 2009, the Ukrainian government planned on reforming the health care system, by the creation of a national network of family doctors and improvements in the medical emergency services. Ukrainian Prime Minister Yulia Tymoshenko wanted (in November 2009) to start introducing a public healthcare system based on health insurance in the spring of 2010.

Further reform was promised by Health Minister Alexander Kvitashvili in 2014 but proposals failed to make political progress and he offered his resignation - which was not accepted. State funding for hospitals cover only the electricity and meager staff salaries, leading to widespread bribery. Even hot water is a problem. Charitable donations are needed to buy even basic medicines or fuel needed to visit patients.

Although some companies (in their collective agreement) supply their employees insurance medicine Ukraine doesn't. But it is making a switch to insurance medicine, a transformation that will start in 2017 and will last until 2020.

Ukrainian healthcare should be free to citizens according to law, but in practice patients contribute to the cost of most aspects of healthcare.

== Medical institutions ==
Flag of the Ministry of Health Care

As of March 2015:

- The Ministry of Health of Ukraine has about 3050 medical institutions (almost 91% of the total number in Ukraine).
- The Department of Corrections has 114 institutions (almost 3%).
- The Academy of Medical Sciences has 41 medical institutions (1%).

== Indicators ==
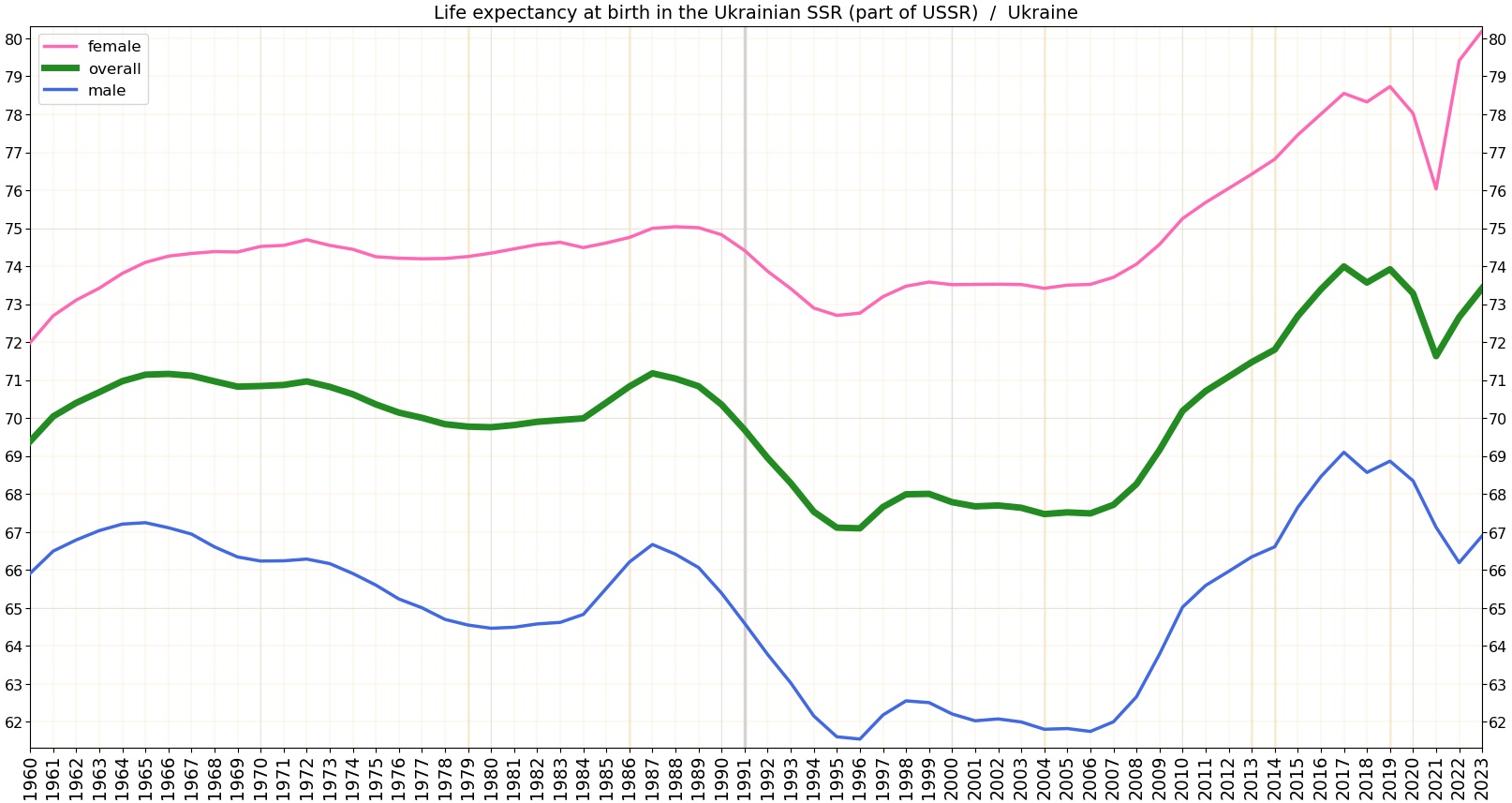
Life expectancy at birth in Ukraine

As of March 2009:

- The capacity of [hospital] institutions in all ministries and [departments] today is 436.4 thousand beds.
- Institutions have 403 thousand beds,
- Department of Corrections, has 11 thousand beds,
- 7.5 thousand beds are subordinated to the Academy of Medical Sciences.
- Outpatient clinics are designed for 957.1 thousand visits per shift.
- The Ministry of Health has a network of outpatient clinics, which are designed for 890.7 thousand visits per shift.
- The institutions of the Academy of Medical Sciences can consult about 5 thousand patients per shift.

A total of 207.9 thousand doctors worked in health care in 2008, 82% of them in the Ministry of Health, and the rest in departmental medicine. The shortage of medical staff reached 48 thousand people. Provision of doctors in the field - 45.2 per 10 thousand population. Of these, 26.7 doctors (per 10,000 population) directly provide medical care, which is much lower than the European average.

== Medical reform in Ukraine ==
- November 30, 2016 - The Cabinet of Ministers of Ukraine approved the Concept of Health Care Reform. The Ministry of Health was instructed to develop an action plan for its implementation.
- October 19, 2017 -VRU adopted the medical reform, it was supported by 240 deputies.
- January 1, 2018 - the bill comes into force. The state must pay for medical services under the program of medical guarantees to institutions from August 1, 2018.
- July 2, 2018 - An updated list of services primary health care came into force in Ukraine.
- January 1, 2020 - reimbursement prices of medicines from the state guaranteed package are introduced. It is proposed to create about 100 Hospital Districts by 2018.

== See also ==
- Emergency Medicine Reform in Ukraine since 2016
- Health in Ukraine
