= Ulana Suprun =

Ukrainian-American physician, activist

- Уляна Супрун
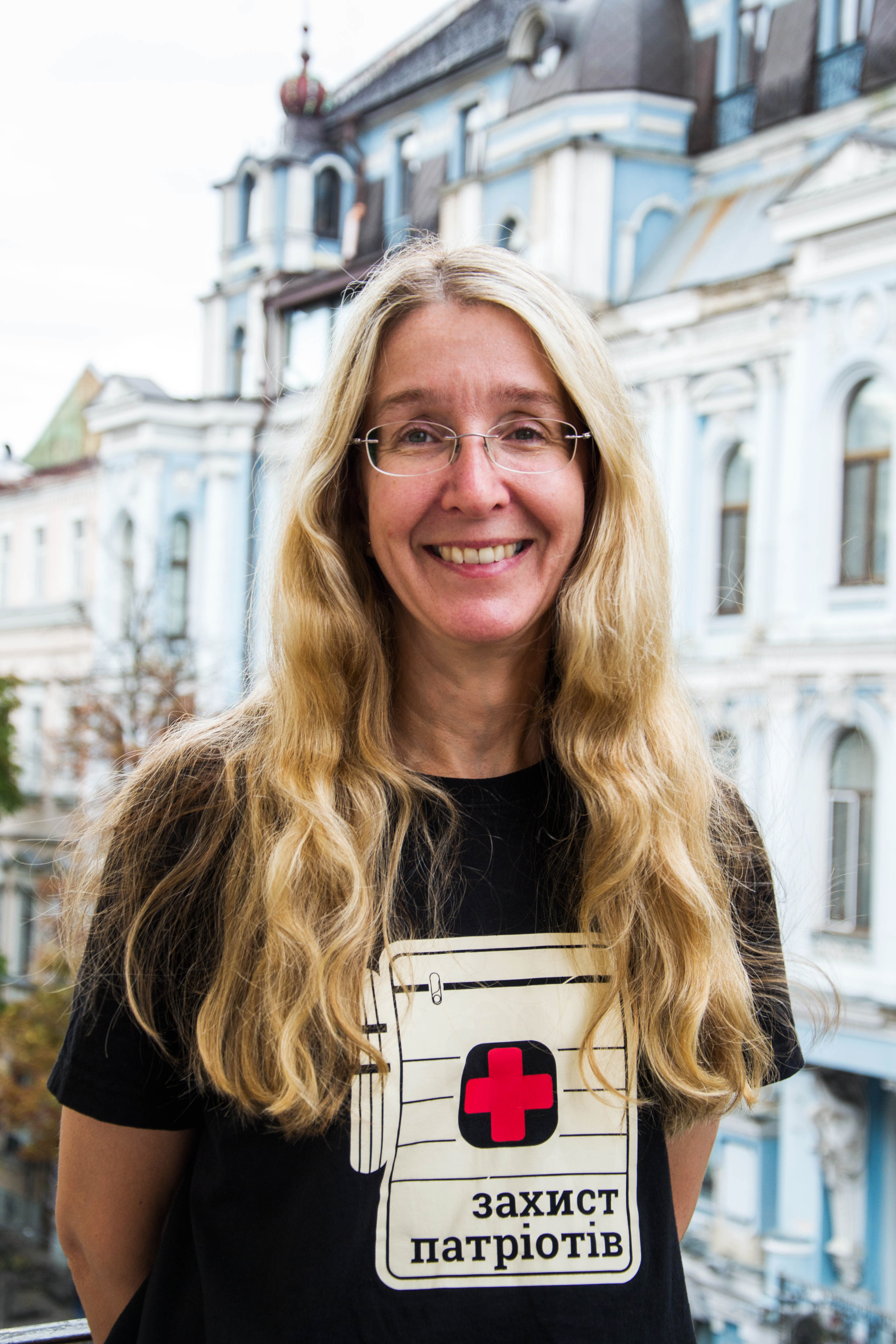

Acting Minister of Healthcare
- In office 27 July 2016 – 29 August 2019
- Prime Minister: Volodymyr Groysman
- Preceded by: Viktor Shafransky (Acting)
- Succeeded by: Zoriana Skaletska

Deputy Minister of Healthcare
- In office 22 July 2016 – 27 July 2016
- Prime Minister: Volodymyr Groysman

Personal details
- Born: Ulana Nadia Jurkiw; 30 January 1963 (age 63) Detroit Michigan, U.S.
- Citizenship: United States; Ukraine
- Spouse: Marko Suprun
- Education: Wayne State University (BS); Michigan State University College of Human Medicine (MD)

Ulana Nadia Suprun (Note: Ukrainian: Уляна Надія Супрун, romanized: Uliana Nadiia Suprun) (born 30 January 1963, née Jurkiw) (Note: Ukrainian: Юрків, romanized: Yurkiv) is a Ukrainian-American physician, activist, and philanthropist who served as the acting Minister of Healthcare from 2016 to 2019. Prior to her government career, Suprun served as Director of Humanitarian Initiatives for the Ukrainian World Congress.

Suprun is the founder of the nongovernmental organization Patriot Defence, which is devoted to developing tactical and emergency medical care in Ukraine. After moving from the United States to Ukraine in 2013, she was appointed Director of the School of Rehabilitation Medicine at Ukrainian Catholic University and became an advisor to the Committee on Health of the Verkhovna Rada in 2015. On 22 July 2016, she was nominated First Deputy Minister of Healthcare by Prime Minister Volodymyr Groysman; the nomination was supported by President Petro Poroshenko and confirmed by the Cabinet of Ministers. A week after taking office as Deputy Minister, Suprun was elevated to acting Minister of Healthcare due to the position's longstanding vacancy.

Ukrainian citizenship was conferred upon Suprun by Poroshenko in July 2015 and Ukraine's Immigration Service has repeatedly stated that her citizenship status is not under question.

== Early life and education ==
Suprun was born on 30 January 1963 in Detroit, Michigan to parents George Harry and Zenovia Jurkiw, of Ukrainian descent. She has a sister named Lydia. Suprun attended Immaculate Conception Ukrainian Catholic School in Warren, Michigan. In her youth, Suprun was a member of Plast. After finishing high school, Suprun enrolled in Wayne State University in Detroit. She graduated with a bachelor of science degree in biology in 1985.

Following her graduation from university, Suprun attended Michigan State University College of Human Medicine in East Lansing, Michigan, where she graduated with her Doctor of Medicine degree in 1989. Afterwards, Suprun completed her intermediate residency with the Oakwood Health System in Detroit, and later worked as a diagnostic radiology resident at Icahn School of Medicine at Mount Sinai in New York City. From 1994 to 1995, Suprun undertook postgraduate research in mammography and tomographic radiology at Henry Ford Hospital in Detroit. She is board certified in radiology.

== Career ==
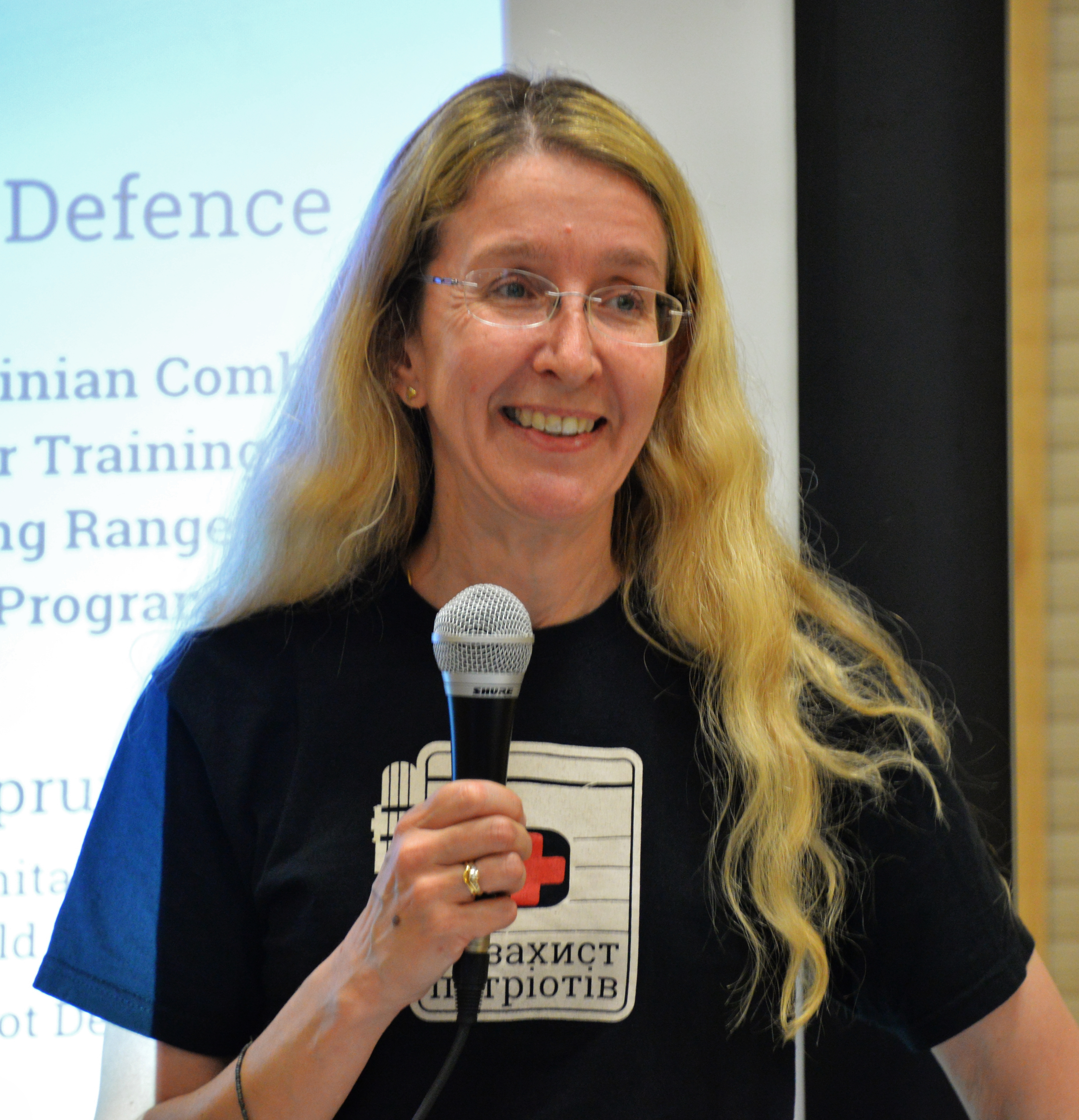
Suprun speaking in Toronto in 2015.

In 1995, Suprun began working at a women's medical imaging center in New York City. She left this position in 1999, after being named acting Director of Women's Imaging at Henry Ford Hospital in Detroit. In 2000, she returned to the New York medical imaging center when she became deputy chief physician-radiologist. Suprun later became deputy medical director and partner at the medical center. She left the position in 2009.

While in the United States, Suprun was active in a number of medical and Ukrainian-American organizations. She has served as a member of the supervisory boards of the First Volunteer Mobile Hospital (FVMH) and the Ukrainian Congress Committee of America (1990–present), as director of the Council of Humanitarian Aid for Ukrainians (UCCA) from 1997 to 1999, and as president of the Ukrainian American Civil Liberties Association from 2000 to 2009.

In 2013, Suprun and her husband left the United States and moved to Ukraine. They became active in the 2014 Ukrainian revolution, and Suprun performed medical procedures for those injured during Euromaidan. This led to her being named Director of Humanitarian Initiatives for the Ukrainian World Congress. Suprun later founded Patriot Defence, a nongovernmental organization (NGO) that provides tactical medical training and distributes NATO first aid kits to Ukrainian servicemen. Following her work during Euromaidan, Suprun became the founder and was appointed director of the School of Rehabilitation Medicine at Ukrainian Catholic University in Lviv.

== Minister of Healthcare ==
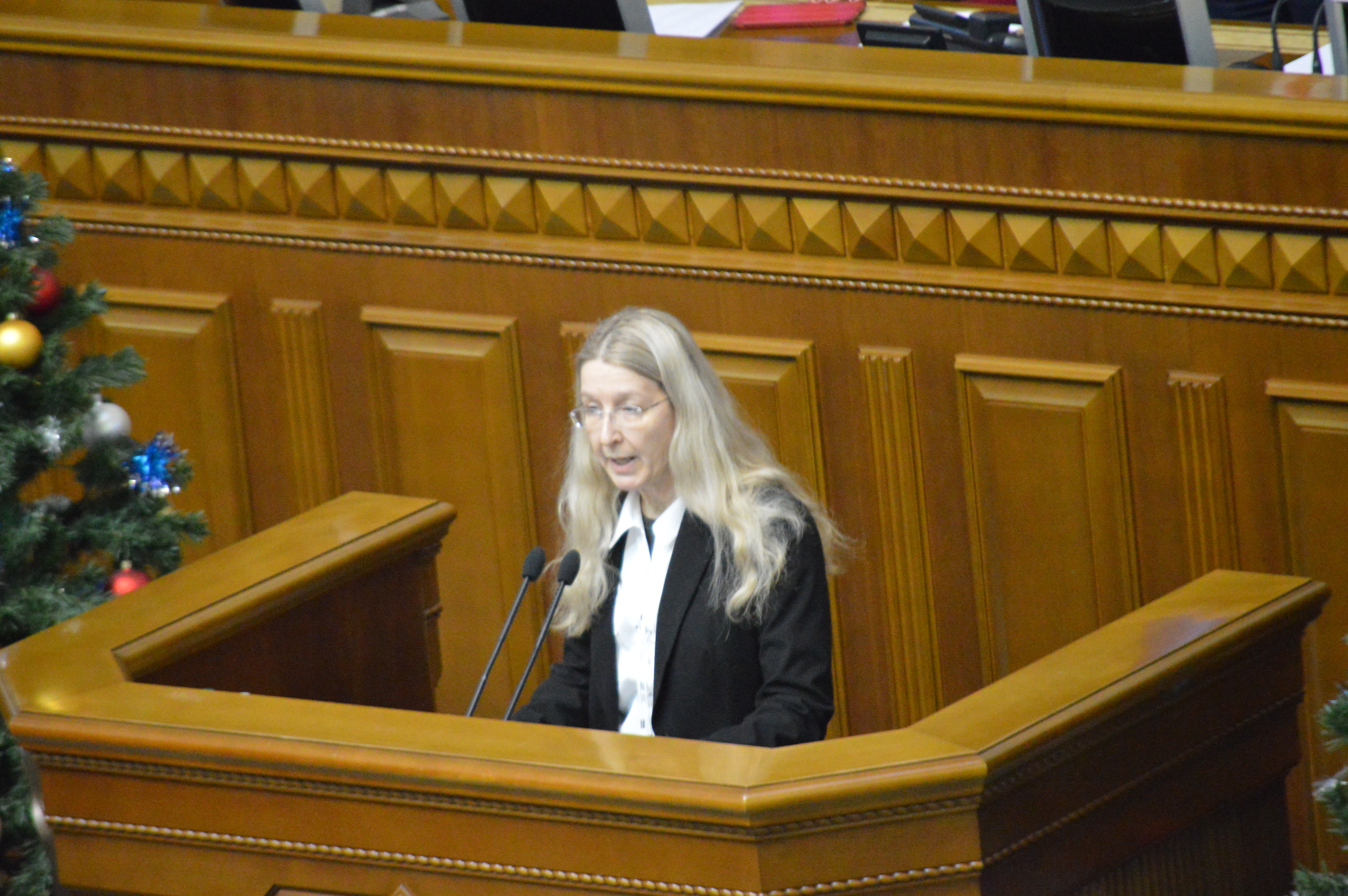
Suprun speaking before the Verkhovna Rada in 2018.

On 12 July 2016, President Petro Poroshenko announced his support for a proposal by Prime Minister Volodymyr Groysman to appoint Suprun as First Deputy Minister of Healthcare. She had previously been serving as an advisor to the Committee on Health of the Verkhovna Rada since 2015. After serving for a week, Suprun was elevated to the position of acting Minister of Healthcare. She was succeeded as Deputy Minister by Pavlo Kovtonyuk, Oleksandr Linchevsky, and Oksana Syvak.

On 30 November 2016, ten resolutions regarding laying the foundations for reforming the Ukrainian healthcare system, as well as resolving operational issues in the management of the medical sector were adopted by the Government. Specifically, the resolutions focused on healthcare financing reform, development of a national health strategy, establishment of hospital districts, approving of licensing conditions for the conduct of economic activities for the production of medicinal products, as well as two resolutions which allocated more than ₴867 million to healthcare reform.

On 1 April 2017, the Government and the Ministry of Healthcare launched the Affordable Medicines program, and allocated ₴500 million to the program. Through the program, patients would receive medications for cardiovascular disease, type 2 diabetes, and bronchial asthma for free or with a small surcharge. By that July, 6,179 pharmacies had begun taking part in the program. By August, the program was allocated an additional ₴20 million for further growth. On 8 June 2017, the Verkhovna Rada adopted the Draft-Law #6327, which would introduce a new model of financing the healthcare system in Ukraine. On 19 October, the Verkhovna Rada passed the law on its second reading. It went into effect on 30 January 2018.

After being conferred Ukrainian citizenship, and submitting all necessary paperwork in compliance with Ukrainian law, Ukraine's immigration service has confirmed several times that her citizenship status does not violate Ukrainian law. Ihor Mosiychuk, a former deputy of the Verkhovna Rada, filed a nuisance case against Suprun which argued that she could no longer remain an acting minister for more than a month due to concerns around her citizenship status. On 5 February 2019, a Kyiv court ruled that Suprun could not sign documents but could remain an acting minister because of this. On 14 February, the court reversed their own decision, allowing Suprun to continue serving as acting Minister of Healthcare. Mosiychuk's case has since been dismissed.

Critics opposed to the medical reforms began referring to Suprun derogatorily, employing the moniker "Dr. Death" (Ukrainian: лікар-смерть). It continues to reappear in several websites. She left the position on 29 August 2019, after Zoriana Skaletska was appointed Minister of Healthcare in the Honcharuk Government.

== Personal life ==
On 11 July 2016, Ukrainian citizenship was conferred upon Suprun and her husband by President Petro Poroshenko. Poroshenko stated that her "efforts saved thousands of lives", and that the decree awarding citizenship were deemed "in the state's best interests".

== Notes ==
Political offices
Preceded by Viktor Shafransky	Minister of Healthcare; Acting; 2016–2019	Succeeded by Zoriana Skaletska
