= Patriot Defence =

Ukrainian non-governmental organization

Patriot Defence/Захист Патріотів
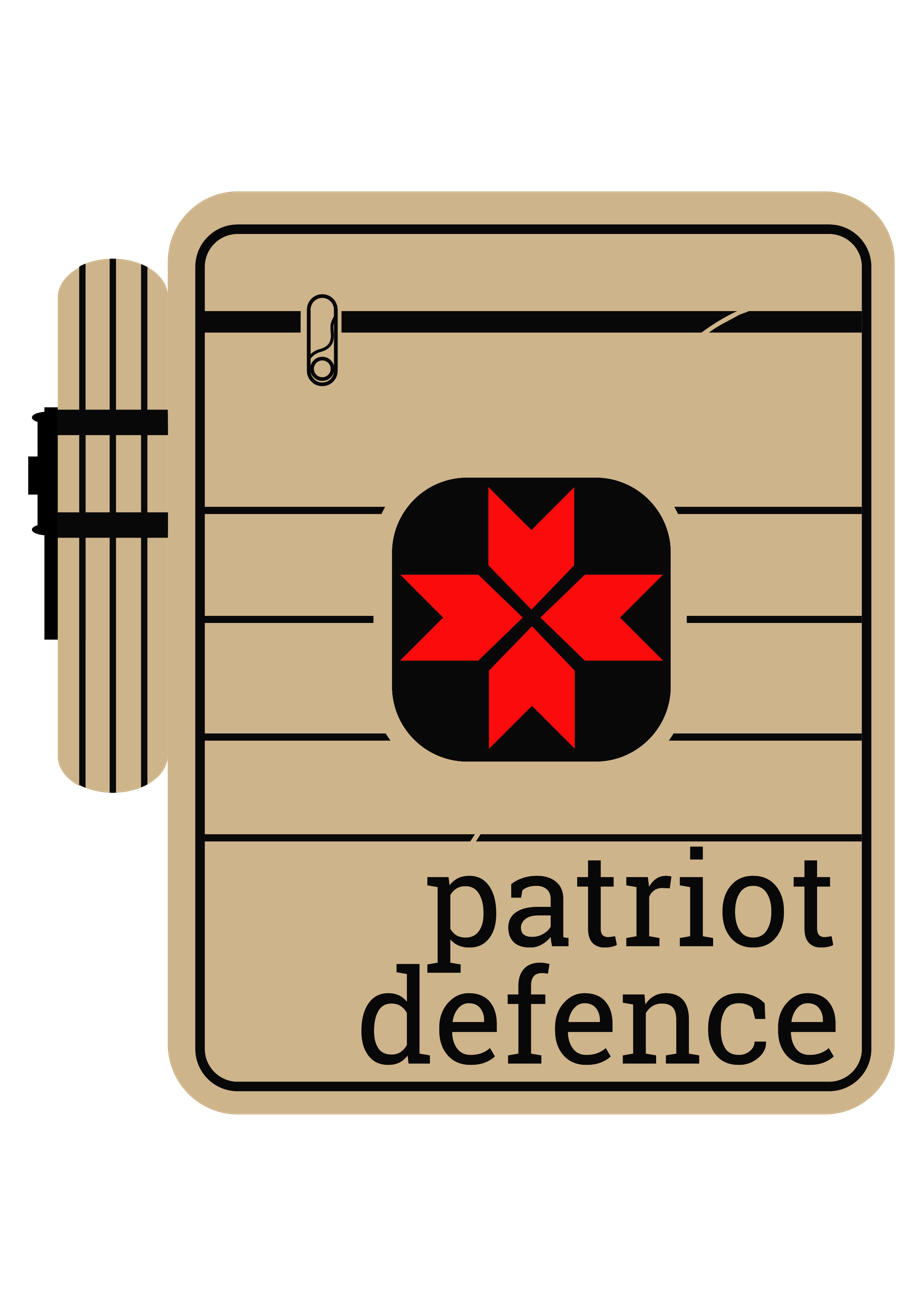
- Founded: May 2014
- Location: Kyiv, Ukraine
- Official language: UkraineUnited States
- Key people: Dr. Ulana Suprun (Founder & former Executive Director) Marko Suprun (current Executive Director) Dr. Alexander Linchevskiy (former Medical Director)
- Website: http://www.patriotdefence.org

Patriot Defence (Ukrainian: Захист Патріотів, romanized: Zakhyst Patriotiv) is a non-governmental organization (NGO) founded in May 2014 as a humanitarian initiative of the Ukrainian World Congress, for consistent development of tactical and emergency medical care in Ukraine. Its headquarters is in Kyiv, Ukraine, although various medical training programs are conducted all around the country.

== History ==
Ulana Suprun (founder and former executive director of Patriot Defence) and husband Marko Suprun (current executive director) arrived in Ukraine in the fall of 2013. Both were on the Maidan during the Revolution of Dignity in Kyiv (2014 Ukrainian revolution) from November 29. Ulana worked in the medical services of the Euromaidan while Marko helped rescue injured individuals as well as translated for foreign journalists. This activism subsequently led to Ulana's position as the Director of Humanitarian Initiatives of the Ukrainian World Congress and ultimately the creation of Patriot Defence in May 2014.

It was evident from the onset of the war in Donbas (referred to by the Ukrainian government as the Anti-Terrorist Operation zone (ATO zone) in Donetsk, Luhansk and (a small part of) Kharkiv oblast) that the Ukrainian troops were ill-prepared for the war. Overall the medical support and training provided to troops was insufficient however there was a palpable lack of knowledge about battlefield medicine. Soldiers were given no medical training to prepare for battle, while they either received a Soviet era medical kit with old bandages and rubber tourniquets or nothing. Patriot Defence combats these problems with a holistic approach; providing medical supplies in the form of NATO standard individual first aid kits (IFAKS) and medical training for soldiers, civilians and doctors.

== Activities ==
Patriot Defence is a team of coordinators and world class instructors, led by Director and founder Dr. Ulana Suprun and medical director Dr. Alexander Linchevskiy. In early July 2016, Prime Minister Volodymyr Groysman approached Ulana about becoming the new Deputy Minister of Health of Ukraine and on July 22, 2016, Ulana was appointed by Ukraine's Cabinet of Ministers. On July 27, 2016, Ulana was appointed acting Minister of Healthcare in Ukraine by Ukraine's Cabinet of Ministers. Patriot Defence's activities are organized in cooperation with various institutions and public organizations in Ukraine and abroad. Patriot Defence has signed Memorandums of cooperation with the Security Service of Ukraine, the Ministry of Internal Affairs, the National Guard, the State Border Service, the Ministry of Defense of Ukraine, the Armed Forces of Ukraine, and Highly Mobile Amphibious Landing Units of the Armed Forces of Ukraine. A number of Patriot Defence programs have been implemented thanks to the support of both the Canadian Embassy and the Australian Embassy, as well as the support of the Government of Canada.

=== Military training ===
Patriot Defence provides training for Ukrainian soldiers through the Combat Lifesaver course (CLS) and also supplies each soldier trained with a NATO standard individual first aid kit (IFAK). Instructors at Patriot Defence are certified in accordance with international medical standards in order to carry out professional training in evidence based medicine. This is directed and developed through the international protocols of Tactical Combat Casualty Care (TCCC), the US Military standard. CLS training is taught to all member state soldiers of NATO. Patriot Defence instructors hold two or three day courses where the skills learned are practiced through combat simulations. The instructors also ensure that all soldiers know how to use the components of their IFAKs.

Patriot Defence worked with former military personnel from the United Kingdom to develop the Ukrainian Long Range Patrol Medic (ULRP) course for special forces units who work in the Ukrainian Military and state services in 2014. The course prepares one patrol medic per special unit in order to provide qualitative and timely preparation in case emergency medical intervention is needed. Upon completion of the course, each military medic receives a medical backpack for special forces which contains the equipment needed to save lives in extreme situations.

=== Training doctors ===
In 2015, Patriot Defence assembled a team of qualified Ukrainian and international instructors who started a new course to increase the knowledge and skills of Ukrainian doctors to raise their qualifications to international standards. The Ukrainian Trauma Life Support (UTLS) program is based on modern approaches to treat trauma. The course instructors are professionals who studied and worked in the West; some are former military professionals from the United States, Great Britain as well as Canada who served in the most critical conflict areas worldwide.

=== Civilian training ===
Patriot Defence partnered with “MotoHelp" to begin training the new police forces in Ukraine. The specially adapted course was developed modeling international standards, the Tactical Emergency Casualty Care (TECC). The new patrol in Kyiv began its work with 2,000 first aid kits and 210 medical bags for patrol cars, in part with the support of the Embassy of Australia in Ukraine. Training for the police force is continuing in other cities all around Ukraine.

Patriot Defence also taught 587 students and 133 'Plastuny' (youth members of the Ukrainian Scouting Organization PLAST) first aid courses. Patriot Defence regularly conducts civilian training for Basic First Aid (BFA) and CPR. Patriot Defence also conducts Emergency Medical Responder (EMR) training for civilians from organizations that provide emergency medical care for the government, corporations, police, fire brigades, penitentiaries and private security firms.

== Other initiatives ==
Results as of July, 2016
| Training Programs & Products | Output |
|---|---|
| Combat Lifesaver (CLS) training | 26,524 soldiers 4,317 cadets |
| Long Range Patrol Medic (LRPM) training | 261 soldiers 180 tactical medical bags |
| Ukrainian Trauma Life Support (UTLS) training | 97 military doctors 82 civilian doctors |
| Individual First Aid Kits (IFAKs) distributed | 21,500 IFAKs |

=== Cooperation with War in Donbas veterans ===
Patriot Defence includes Ukrainian War in Donbas veterans in their training operations, specifically in the “Ukrainian Long Range Patrol Medic” course (ULRPM). Wounded ATO veterans play the role of injured victims during training simulations for military doctors and medics of the special forces. Simulations with injured veterans allows soldiers to sharpen their skills and mentally prepare them for what actually occurs in the ATO zone.

=== Conference on Tactical Medicine ===
Patriot Defence organizes international conferences on tactical medicine in Ukraine with the goal of elevating domestic tactical medicine with international standards. Partners and participants include domestic and international experts on tactical medicine, representatives of NATO member states as well as the internal agencies and ministries dealing with security and their respective training institutions. The first conference on Tactical Medicine was held in January 2015, while the second was held in March 2016. The conferences include theoretical panels and practical training.
