= P.L. Shupyk National Medical Academy of Postgraduate Education =

Public university in Kyiv, Ukraine

Coordinates: 50.4698°N 30.4490°E

Shupyk National Healthcare University of Ukraine
- Національний університет охорони здоров’я України імені П.Л.Шупика; Nat︠s︡ionalʹnyĭ universytet okhorony zdorov'i︠a︡ Ukraïny imeni P.L.Shupyka
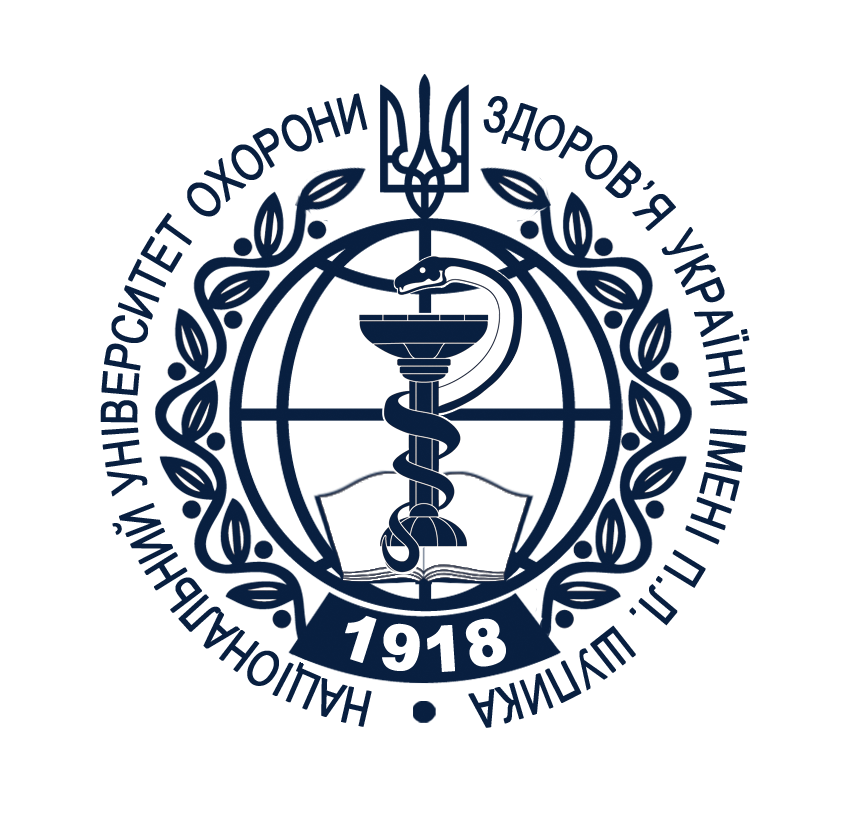
- Type: public university, research center, medical university
- Established: 1918
- Accreditation: Ministry of Education and Science of Ukraine
- Affiliations: Ministry of Health of Ukraine
- Rector: Viacheslav Kaminskyi
- Location: Kyiv, Ukraine
- Campus: Suburban
- Website: www.nuozu.edu.ua
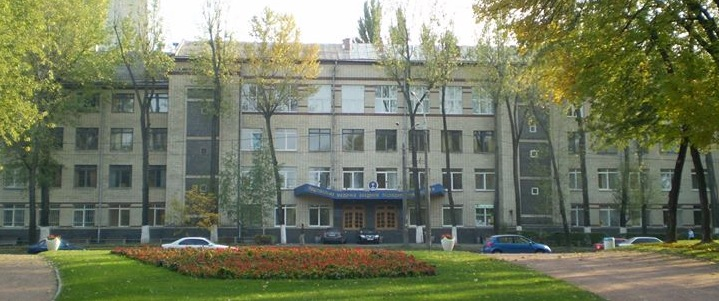

The Platon L. Shupyk National Healthcare University of Ukraine (abbr. SNHUU) is a higher education institute in Kyiv, the capital of Ukraine. For decades, the institute has established itself as a higher educational, methodological, and research centre.

== History ==
The Shupyk National Healthcare University of Ukraine (SNHUU) began as the Kiev Institute of Advanced Training of Physicians, which was established in 1918 during under the Ukrainian State system, and which is recognised as an early academic and research institutions in Ukraine, contributing to the revival and development of Ukrainian education, science, and technology.

The Institute received a new status in the year of the fifth anniversary of Ukrainian independence after the Cabinet of Ministers of Ukraine issued the Resolution "On the formation of Kiev Medical Academy of Postgraduate Education" (13 May 1996). This resolution recognised the academy as an educational institution of a distinct nature, granting it a higher, level IV accreditation.

In 1998, in accordance with a resolution by the Cabinet of Ministers of Ukraine, the Academy was named after Platon L. Shupyk, a distinguished statesman and scientist who had served as the Minister of Health of Ukraine on two occasions. Professor Shupyk made significant contributions to the development of the academy's material, educational, and scientific infrastructure.

In 2006, the Academy was granted national institution status by the president of Ukraine.

In 2018, the Academy celebrated its 100th anniversary.

On February 10, 2021, the Academy was renamed as the Shupyk National Healthcare University of Ukraine by order No.225 of the Ministry of Health of Ukraine.

== Academics ==
Throughout its existence the SNHUU has become a leading institution of postgraduate medical education, as well as an important research centre, with 5 faculties—of surgery, therapy, pediatrics, medico-prophylactic, and pharmaceutical faculty—advanced faculty staff training, the Institute of Family Medicine, the Ukrainian State Institute of Reproductology, and the Institute of Dentistry. There are 79 Departments. Today, the University employs: 8 members of the National Academy of Sciences of Ukraine, 3 members of the Academy of Sciences of the Higher School of Ukraine, 1 corresponding member of the National Academy of Sciences of Ukraine, 15 corresponding members of the National Academy of Medical Sciences of Ukraine, 30 Honoured Workers of Science and Technology of Ukraine, 35 winners of the State Prize of Ukraine in Science and Technology, 80 Honoured Doctors of Ukraine, 3 Honoured Workers of Education of Ukraine, 3 Honoured Rationalizers and Inventors of Ukraine, 9 Honoured Workers of Healthcare of Ukraine, and 2 Honoured Workers of Pharmacy of Ukraine.

SNHUU is a leading centre of work in postgraduate fields and is authorized by the Ministry of Health of Ukraine to develop the majority of standard programs in courses of precertification training and traineeship in computer attestation programs, to be used by all medical institutions and faculties of postgraduate education.

70 curricula and programs of advanced training are developed and updated annually. Among them these are the original programs: "Digital technology in radiology", "Topical questions of quality maintenance and prevention of medicines adulteration", "Chemists' work at the market", "Untraditional methods of dental diseases treatment", "Financing and management in health care in Ukraine", "Modern technologies in interventional cardiology", "Ultrasound diagnosis of close defects of cardial septa", etc.

The Department of Medical Information Technology, in particular, is an initiator, organizer, and founder of a form of distance education. Since 2006, the academic and methodological centre of distance education has been at the SNHUU.

In 2016, the Simulation Training Center was established with the aim of introducing simulation learning methods into the educational process, in accordance with modern world practices in medical education, to ensure maximum safety of patients and doctors during training in, and performing of, invasive medical and diagnostic procedures.

Physicians' post-graduate education is composed of internship, master's courses, specialization, topical advanced training. and precertification courses.

Over 20,000 physicians and pharmacists are trained at the SNHUU annually.

Scientific and research work at the university is an integral part in training highly qualified specialists and is performed in accordance with the generalized plan of scientific and research activity. The plan includes the scientific and research activity in foreground trends that have purpose investment (funding scientific and technical programs, government orders, fundamental and applied scientific and research activity in the field of preventive and clinical medicine), initiative and competitive (department) extrabudget (state contractual) dissertations (doctor's and candidate's).

The number of clinical bases of all property forms is 248.

Annually, over 14,000 surgical interventions are performed, 146,000 consultations are made, and 93,000 patients are treated clinically. SNHUU staff members implement up-to-date methods of prophylaxis, diagnosis, and treatment of disease.

Within the framework of the Ukrainian Emergency Medical Care system, SNHUU staff members constantly go to regions of Ukraine to consult with, and give medical care to, patients with the most severe pathologies.

== Honorable doctors and famous alumni ==
The following prominent scientists are member-correspondents of the Academy of Sciences:

- V.H. Vasylenko
- B.M. Man'kovskyi
- M.M. Amosov
- O.O. Shalimov
- D.F. Chobotariov
- F.Yu. Bohdanov
- L.I. Medvid'
- O.M. Marzeiev
- D.M. Kaliuzhnyi
- O.I. Arutiunov
- B.P. Komisarenko
- V.D. Bratus'
- L.V. Tymoshenko
- M.H. Shandala
- E.L. Macheret
- M.D. Strazhesko
- M.S. Kolomiichenko
- L.A. Pyrih
- V.I. Koziavkin
- M.M. Sergiienko

At different times in Ukraine the founders of new schools became scientists of the university, such as:

- M.M. Amosov
- Yu.P. Vdovychenko
- Yu.V. Voronenko
- I.M. Hanzha
- O.A. Yevdoshchenko
- Ye.V. Kohanevych
- E.L. Macheret
- O.P. Mintser
- M.Ye. Polishchyk
- M.M. Sergiienko
- L.V. Tymoshenko
- A.I. Trishchuns'kyi
- O.O. Shalimov.

Member-correspondents of the National Academy of Science and National Academy of Medical Science, such as:

- Yu.V. Voronenko
- O.K. Tolstanov
- Yu.I. Feshchenko
- S.O. Vozianov
- V.V. Kaminskyi
- M.Ye. Polishyk
- V.V. Kovalenko
- M. D. Tronko
- V.V. Lazoryshynets
- O.Iu. Usenko
- N.H. Horovenko
- S.O. Rykov
- H.V. Beketova
- B.M. Mankovskyi
- N.M. Rudenko
- B.M. Todurov
- N.V. Kharchenko
- Ye.Ie. Shunko

== International relations ==
The university has organized the Department of International Relations and Scientific-Pedagogical Work with Foreign Subjects. The major purpose of the department is to participate in developing and realizing international educational, scientific, clinical, and humanitarian programs.

The relation of the university with foreign countries develops from year to year. Annually, over 30–50 foreign delegations visit the university. A number of agreements of cooperation with many countries have been signed.

Over 70 scientists visit other countries annually. Training visits are aimed at on-site training in the leading clinics, exchanging experience, establishing cooperative relations, and participating in congresses and symposia. Young scientists take traineeships in leading clinics of the West.

Leading scientists of Germany, Greece, Sweden, Austria, and the UK are honorary professors of the university.

The university's partners include:

- the University of Colorado (United States)
- Jagiellonian University (Poland)
- Scottish Royal College of General Practitioners (United Kingdom)
- German Academy of Development Rehabilitation (Munich)
- University of Bari (Italy)
- Medical University of Lublin (Poland)
- Slovak Medical University
- LMU Munich (Germany)
- University of Maastricht (The Netherlands)
- Medical University of Silesia (Poland)
- International Academy of Classical Homeopathy (Greece)

Great attention is paid at the university to training foreign citizens. Almost 400 foreigners from 54 countries are trained at SNHUU annually. Young scientists of the university take traineeships in leading clinics of France, Sweden, Poland, the United Kingdom, the United States, Switzerland, etc.

== See also ==
- List of universities in Ukraine
- List of medical universities in Ukraine
