= Ministry of Health (Ukraine) =

Government ministry

Ministry of health of Ukraine
- Міністерство охорони здоров'я України
- Logo Ministry of Health

- Flag of Ministry of Health

Agency overview
- Formed: 1991
- Preceding agencies: Ministry of Health of Ukrainian Soviet Socialist Republic; People's Commissariat of Health of Ukrainian Soviet Socialist Republic; Ministry of Public Health and Welfare of Directorate of Ukraine
- Jurisdiction: Government of Ukraine
- Headquarters: 7, M. Hrushevsky street, Kyiv, 01601
- Employees: app. 200
- Annual budget: 174 bln. ₴ (2023)
- Agency executive: Viktor Liashko, Minister of Health of Ukraine
- Parent department: Cabinet of Ministers of Ukraine
- Child agencies: State Service for Medications and Drugs Control; National Health Service of Ukraine
- Website: moz.gov.ua

The Ministry of Health of Ukraine (Ukrainian: Міністерство охорони здоров'я України, romanized: Ministerstvo okhorony zdorovia Ukrainy, МОЗ) is the main healthcare body in the system of central government of Ukraine. It is based on former Ministries of Healthcare.

The ministry consists of the central body headed the Minister of Healthcare and deputies to assist the minister. Ministry deputies elect several state healthcare administrations employees that specialize in certain field and coordinate operation of the government companies.

== Central executive authorities ==
- State Service for Medications and Drugs Control
- National Health Service of Ukraine

== See also ==
- Cabinet of Ministers of Ukraine
- Minister of Healthcare (Ukraine)
- Healthcare in Ukraine
