= COVID-19 vaccination in Ukraine =

Plan to immunize against COVID-19

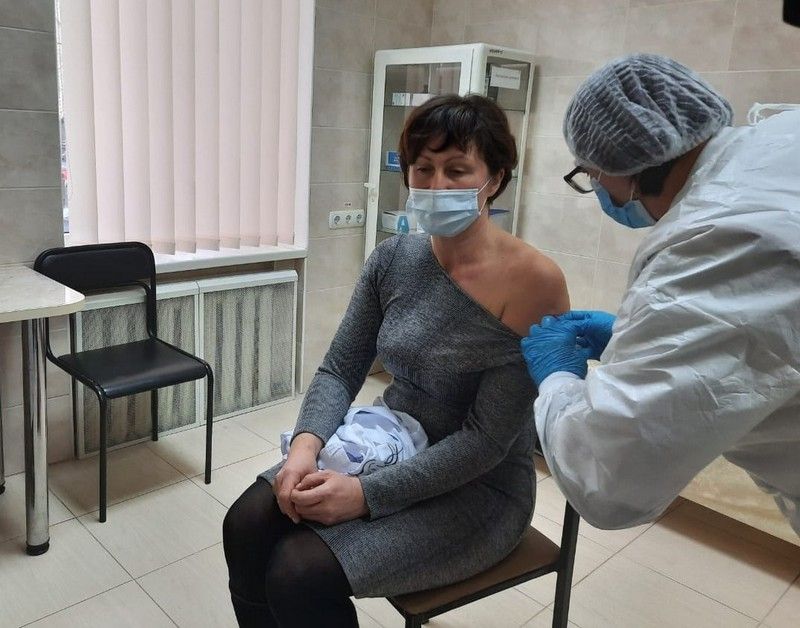
Doctor Lyudmyla Boyko receiving the first vaccination in Vinnytsia Oblast (February 2021)

The COVID-19 vaccination campaign in Ukraine is an ongoing mass immunization campaign for the COVID-19 pandemic in Ukraine. Ukraine's vaccination program started on 24 February 2021 and from that day to 12 September 2021 18% of the adult population of Ukraine had been vaccinated against COVID-19. (About 44% of those vaccinated had been fully vaccinated.) On 7 January 2022, the Ministry of Health announced that 44.9% of the adult population had undergone a full course of vaccination. By 2022, the Ministry of Health plans to vaccinate 70% of the country's adult population, including 80% of the elderly.

Ukraine has used vaccines from four different manufacturers. As for November 3, 2021, 17.2% were vaccinated with AstraZeneca, 29.6% - Coronovac, 41.7% - with Pfizer-BioNTech, 11.5% - with Moderna. By late May 2022 Ukrainians were vaccinated with (only) Coronovac and Pfizer-BioNTech.

In March 2021, about half of the population did not plan to get vaccinated. In an August 2021 poll, 56% of Ukrainians did not plan to be vaccinated. (Note: A June 2021 poll stated 43% of Ukrainians did not intend to be vaccinated against coronavirus.)

After the 24 February 2022 Russian invasion of Ukraine, the Ukrainian vaccination program continued, although on a much smaller scale with by late May 2022 50-60 thousand people being vaccinated in a week. By late May 2022, vaccination continued in all regions of Ukraine, except in Luhansk and Donetsk Oblast. In September 2022, a third dose of the vaccine was offered to everyone who had his last vaccination four months ago.

== Background ==
The worldwide COVID-19 pandemic arrived in Ukraine in March 2020. In 2020 infections began to rise sharply from July which began to top 10,000 cases a day by November. In 2021 new infections and deaths started to break records by late October. By then a total of 2.8 million coronavirus cases and 64,936 COVID-19 related deaths had occurred in Ukraine.

Vaccination against COVID-19 in Ukraine started on 24 February 2021. Ukraine uses vaccines from four different manufacturers.

=== Public opinion ===
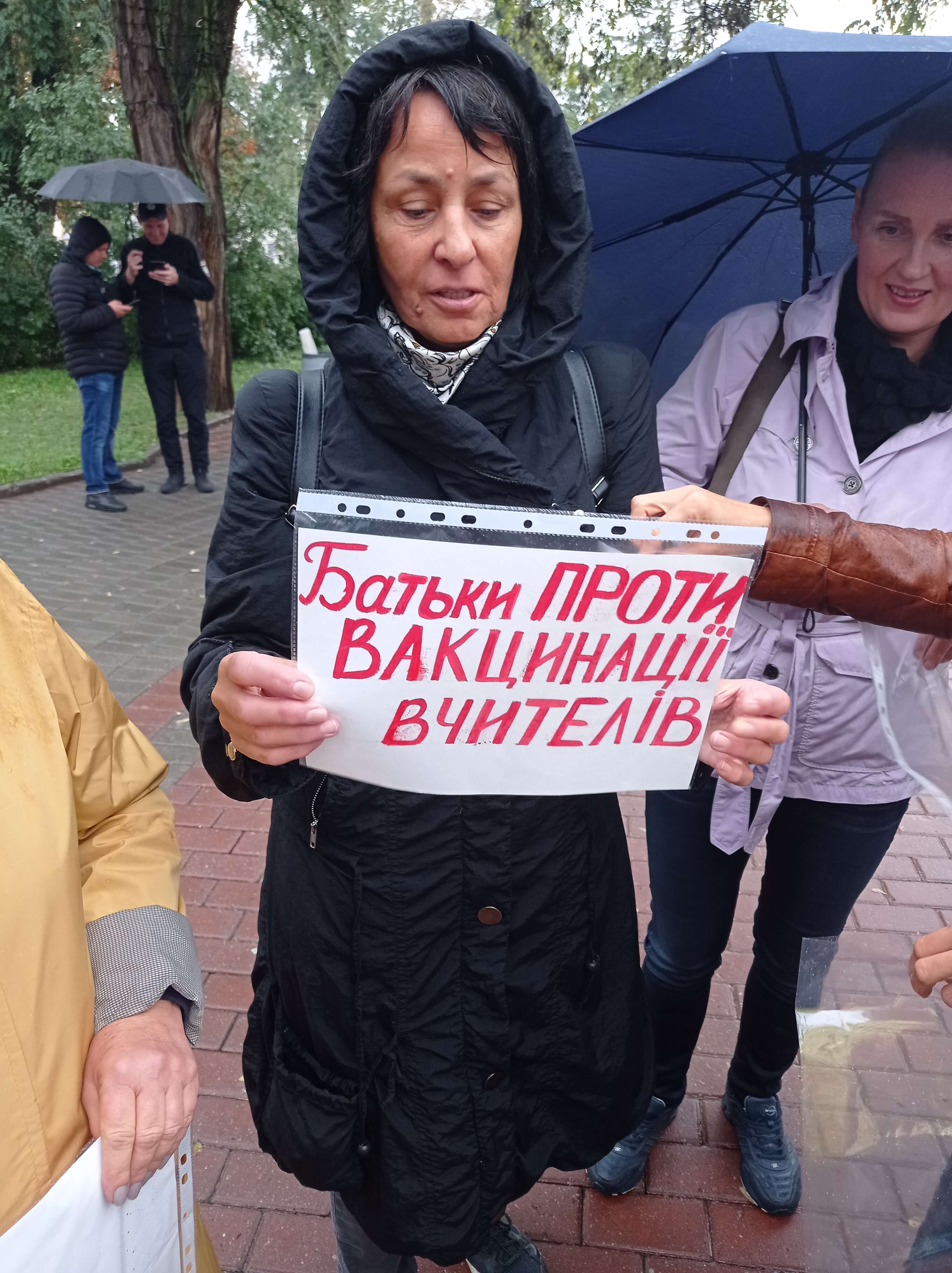
Anti-vaccination protest in Chernihiv (September 2021)

Skepticism towards vaccines in Ukraine was widespread prior to the COVID-19 pandemic. Responding to a 2019 survey, only 29% of Ukrainians said vaccines were safe. Vaccine skepticism is also significant among health workers in Ukraine, with about 40% being categorized as "vaccine hesitant" by UNICEF. In March 2021, about half of the population did not plan to get vaccinated against COVID-19 even if a vaccine were available.

According to a May 2021 poll by International Republican Institute and Sociological group "RATING" the cities Lviv, Vinnytsia, Sumy, Uzhhorod and Ivano-Frankivsk had the highest rate of people who want to be vaccinated. The least interested in getting vaccinated lived in Mariupol, Dnipro, Zaporizhzhia, Sievierodonetsk and Mykolaiv. According to the Ukrainian Ministry of Health in January 2022 Kyiv had the highest vaccination rate (over 71% of adults there had received at least one dose of COVID-19 vaccine). In Kyiv Oblast, Poltava Oblast, Dnipropetrovsk Oblast, Kharkiv Oblast, Sumy Oblast and Cherkasy Oblast more than half of adults had received at least one vaccination. The least vaccinated areas in Ukraine were Zakarpattia Oblast, Ivano-Frankivsk Oblast, Chernivtsi Oblast and Volyn Oblast with less than 40% of adults vaccinated. (According to the ministry's figures in late January 2022 49% of the adult population of Ukraine received at least one dose of COVID-19 vaccine.)

On 15 June 2021, Razumkov Centre released a poll that stated 43% of Ukrainians did not intend to be vaccinated against coronavirus.

In August 2021 56% of Ukrainians polled by the Ilko Kucheriv Democratic Initiatives Foundation did not plan to be vaccinated. In the same poll 52% opposed mandatory vaccination against COVID-19. The same poll also revealed that 23% of those polled considered vaccination an effective means of protection against COVID-19. The most chosen effective methods of preventing coronavirus disease (according to the August 2021 polled Ukrainians) were "washing your hands after leaving the street" (54%), "keeping distance from others" (42%), "being attentive to their well-being and the health of others" (39%), and "wearing a mask" (36%).

=== Comparison with neighbouring countries ===
On 13 September 2021 50% of the population of neighboring Poland was fully vaccinated, in Slovakia this number was 40%, in Turkey 47%, and in Moldova more than 21%. On that exact same date 18% of the adult population of Ukraine had been vaccinated against COVID-19 (the number of vaccinations being 10,710,944).

Early November 2021 34.5% of the population of neighboring Romania was fully vaccinated and for Bulgaria this number was 23.04%. The average fully vaccination rate across the EU was 65.2% at that time. On 22 November 2021 the (fully vaccinated) vaccination rate in Russia was about 37%. On 26 November 2021 the Ministry of Health announced that 42.4% of the adult population (of Ukraine) had received at least one vaccination against COVID-19 and 34.2% had undergone a full course of vaccination.

== Vaccination program ==
=== Start of vaccination ===
Ukraine was offered the Sputnik vaccine, produced in Russia, but in February 2021 Ukraine refused to buy or register it, and since requires all people entering the country who have been vaccinated by Sputnik to take a COVID test.

Vaccination against COVID-19 in Ukraine started on 24 February 2021, but the tempo of vaccinating was extremely slow compared to other European countries. The main reasons are the lack of vaccines (none of the vaccines are produced in Ukraine), disinformation in social media about the effect of vaccines (according to an Atlantic Council analysis primarily by Russia-backed parties) and strong scepticism among the population. In the first quarter of 2021, only about 230,000 Ukrainians were vaccinated, which is 0.4% of the population.

According to the June 2021 planning of Health Minister Viktor Liashko, five million people would have to be fully vaccinated by the end of the summer. In fact only as late as September 16 this number was achieved

=== Summer 2021 ===
Around mid-June 2021, 1.4 million first shots had been given, meaning 3.5% of the total population was partially vaccinated. Meanwhile, 0.6% (2,000 people) of Ukrainians had received the second dose and thus were fully vaccinated. In the first two weeks of June, more than 20,000 people were vaccinated in Ukraine every day. According to an investigation by Lb.ua, in June 2021 it was unclear at what date people could receive their second shot of the vaccine due to unstable and unpredictable delivery schedules. The Ministry of Healthcare assured that there would be enough vaccines for second doses. In June 2021, vaccination of civil servants, prosecutors and judges began, but no first dose had been given to people over the age of 60, people with chronic diseases (such as diabetes) and cancer patients.

On 15 June 2021, members of the (422 seats strong) Ukrainian parliament were vaccinated with the Pfizer–BioNTech COVID-19 vaccine, several MPs claimed that they had not been informed that they would be vaccinated with this particular vaccine. According to the Speaker of the Vekhovna Rada (Note: The Speaker of the Vekhovna Rada himself, Dmytro Razumkov, did not get vaccinated (against COVID-19).), these vaccinations (which was reported to be provided to MPs, their assistants and staff (Note: A total of 828 people, according to parliament.)) were carried out in accordance with the schedule of the Ministry of Healthcare. On 21 September 2021 Servant of the People faction member Mykhailo Radutskyi claimed that 50% of the MP's were unvaccinated. From 14 to 20 June, 367,000 Ukrainians were vaccinated against coronavirus: 246,339 people received a first dose, and 121,654 people a second dose.

On 23 June 2021, the number of people who had received a second dose exceeded 400,000.

On 12 July 2021 3,489,332 vaccine doses had been administered, 2,311,690 Ukrainians had received their first injection, and 1,177,642 their second (and they were considered fully immunised).

By 16 August 2021 4,793,100 people had been vaccinated, of which 2,791,305 people were fully immunized (after having had received two injections). 14 days later 5,359,417 people were vaccinated in Ukraine, of whom 5,359,415 had received the first dose, and 3,722,707 people were fully immunized after receiving both doses. On this August 30, 150,482 people were vaccinated against COVID-19: 50,690 people received a single dose, and 99,792 people their second.

(The next month) in the week from 6 to 12 September, 921,443 vaccines were inoculated into Ukrainians (on 12 September, 16,930 people received one dose and 28,218 people were fully immunized). This making the number of vaccinations given in Ukraine, since 24 February 2021, 10,710,944. So 18% of the adult population of Ukraine had been vaccinated against COVID-19 by 13 September 2021. According to the official statistics of 6 September 2021, 7.6% of people over the age of 80 had received at least one dose of the vaccine, for people aged 40–59 this figure was slightly more than 19% and the most vaccinated group was people aged 18–19 years of whom 19.8% had received at least one dose of vaccine. On 14 September 2021 Prime Minister Denys Shmyhal stated that all of the country's adult population should be vaccinated against COVID-19 by the end of the year.

On 17 September 2021 the Security Service of Ukraine (SBU) stated it had (in Dnipro) dismantled an online influence operations campaign that operated 5,000 bots which (according to the SBU) "was commissioned by curators from the Russian Federation and was engaged in disrupting the national vaccination in Ukraine."

On 20 September 2021 Health Minister Viktor Liashko stated that from June 15 to September 15 92% of those hospitalized with COVID-19 were unvaccinated and 99.2% of recorded COVID-19 deaths were are also unvaccinated patients.

On 14 September 2021 Prime Minister Denys Shmyhal stated that repeated vaccination against COVID-19 in Ukraine was likely to be done next year "because it's not clear which variants will appear and how the virus will behave."

=== Autumn 2021 ===
A late September 2021 investigation by Radio Free Europe revealed that a mass market in fake COVID-19 vaccination certificates. (Note: Allegedly Italian customs let two Ukrainians through who had used fake COVID-19 vaccination certificates.) This demand (for fake COVID-19 vaccination certificates) especially grew after the European Union agreed to recognize Ukrainian digital vaccination documents.

On 15 October 2021 a total of 14,307,558 vaccinations had been administered. 7,873,767 had received one dose and 6,433,791 people were fully immunized after having received two doses. On October 15 itself, 148,438 Ukrainians had been vaccinated.

Demand for vaccinations surged after new infections and deaths started to break records by late October 2021. From 15 to 21 October almost 1 million people were inoculated in Ukraine. On 21 October 16% of Ukraine's population was inoculated. Making Ukraine still one of the least-vaccinated countries in Europe. On 23 October 2021 the Ministry of Health announced that 6.96 million Ukrainians had been fully vaccinated (out of a population of 41 million). On 26 October 291,000 Ukrainians were vaccinated. An unknown number of Ukrainians had purchased an illegal fake COVID-19 vaccine certificate. (Sold from $20 to $200 with some costing as much as $380.) By 25 October (2021) 800 criminal cases for forged certificates or tests for coronavirus had been opened in Ukraine. Also on 25 October Ukrainian authorities reported a record daily high of 734 coronavirus-related deaths.

On 27 October the Ministry of Health approved the vaccination of children over the age of 12.

On 26 November 2021 the Ministry of Health announced that 42.4% of the adult population had received at least one vaccination against COVID-19 and 34.2% had undergone a full course of vaccination. In real life numbers that meant that 13,164,649 people had received one dose of the vaccine, and 10,610,359 people were fully immunized after receiving two doses (a total of 23,775,008 vaccinations). Head of the Ukrainian parliament health commission Mykhailo Radutskyi simultaneously announced that 70,000 children had received a full course of vaccination (against COVID-19) and almost 50,000 had received one vaccination. On 25 November 273,875 people were vaccinated (against COVID-19).

On 14 December 14,221,536 Ukrainians had received their first dose of vaccine, 12,640,221 people had been fully immunized with two doses. On this day 47,137 people received the first dose of vaccine, and 95,784 received their second dose.

On 22 December 2021 the Ministry of Health announced that healthcare professionals and nursing home staff will be offered a booster dose at least six months from the date of their second dose.

=== 2022 ===
On 4 January 2022 the Ministry of Health authorized a booster dose of COVID-19 vaccine for people over 60 years old. They were able to receive a booster dose at least six months after the second. Two days later the ministry stated a booster dose of the COVID-19 vaccine would be available for all 18+ in Ukraine from January 8.

On 7 January 2022 44.9% of the adult Ukrainians had undergone a full course of vaccination.

On 18 January 2022 131,178 Ukrainians had received a booster dose.

The Ministry of Health announced on 8 February 2022 that 50% of the adult population had received at least one dose of vaccine. Simultaneously the Ministry stated that it planned to by 2022 to vaccinate 70% of the country's adult population, including 80% of the elderly.

After the 24 February 2022 Russian invasion of Ukraine the Ukrainian vaccination program continued, although on a much smaller scale with by late May 2022 50-60 thousand people being vaccinated in a week. By late May 2022 vaccination continued in all regions of Ukraine, except in Luhansk and Donetsk Oblast. By then Ukrainians were vaccinated with only two vaccines: CoronaVac and Pfizer.

On 19 September 2022 the Ministry of Health announced the offer of a third dose of the vaccine to everyone four months after their previous injection. The vaccines offered where CoronaVac and Pfizer and Janssen. Also on 19 September 2022 the minimum age for receiving a vaccine was lowered from 12 years to 5 years.

On 4 November 2022 the Ministry of Health announced that all vaccinated children aged 12 to 17 were allowed to be booster-vaccinated against COVID-19.

== Vaccine supply ==
In the first six months of 2021 5.1 million doses of COVID-19 vaccines were delivered to Ukraine, those were 1.9 million doses of CoronaVac, 1.6 million doses of the Oxford–AstraZeneca vaccine, and 1.6 million doses of the Pfizer–BioNTech vaccine.

Early 2021 Russia offered to supply Ukraine with the Sputnik vaccine, but in February 2021 Ukraine refused to buy or register this vaccine.

By the end of June 2021 contracts had been signed for the supply of 37.3 million doses of vaccines, including 20 million doses of the Pfizer–BioNTech vaccine, ten million doses of the Novavax vaccine, 5.3 million doses of CoronaVac, and two million doses of the Oxford–AstraZeneca vaccine. On 5 July 2021 Ukraine approved the Janssen COVID-19 vaccine. In July 2021 Ukraine started to vaccinate with the Moderna COVID-19 vaccine.

On 12 July German Chancellor Angela Merkel stated that Ukraine would receive 1.5 million doses of coronavirus vaccine from Germany.

Mid-September 2021 Ukraine had in stock 10 million vaccines from four different manufacturers. As for 3 November 2021, 17.2% Ukrainians were vaccinated with AstraZeneca, 29.6% - CoronaVac, 41.7% - with Pfizer-BioNTech, 11.5% - with Moderna.

By late May 2022 Ukrainians were vaccinated with (only) Coronovac and Pfizer-BioNTech.

The vaccines offered to Ukrainians in September 2022 where CoronaVac and Pfizer and Janssen.

== Vaccination centres ==
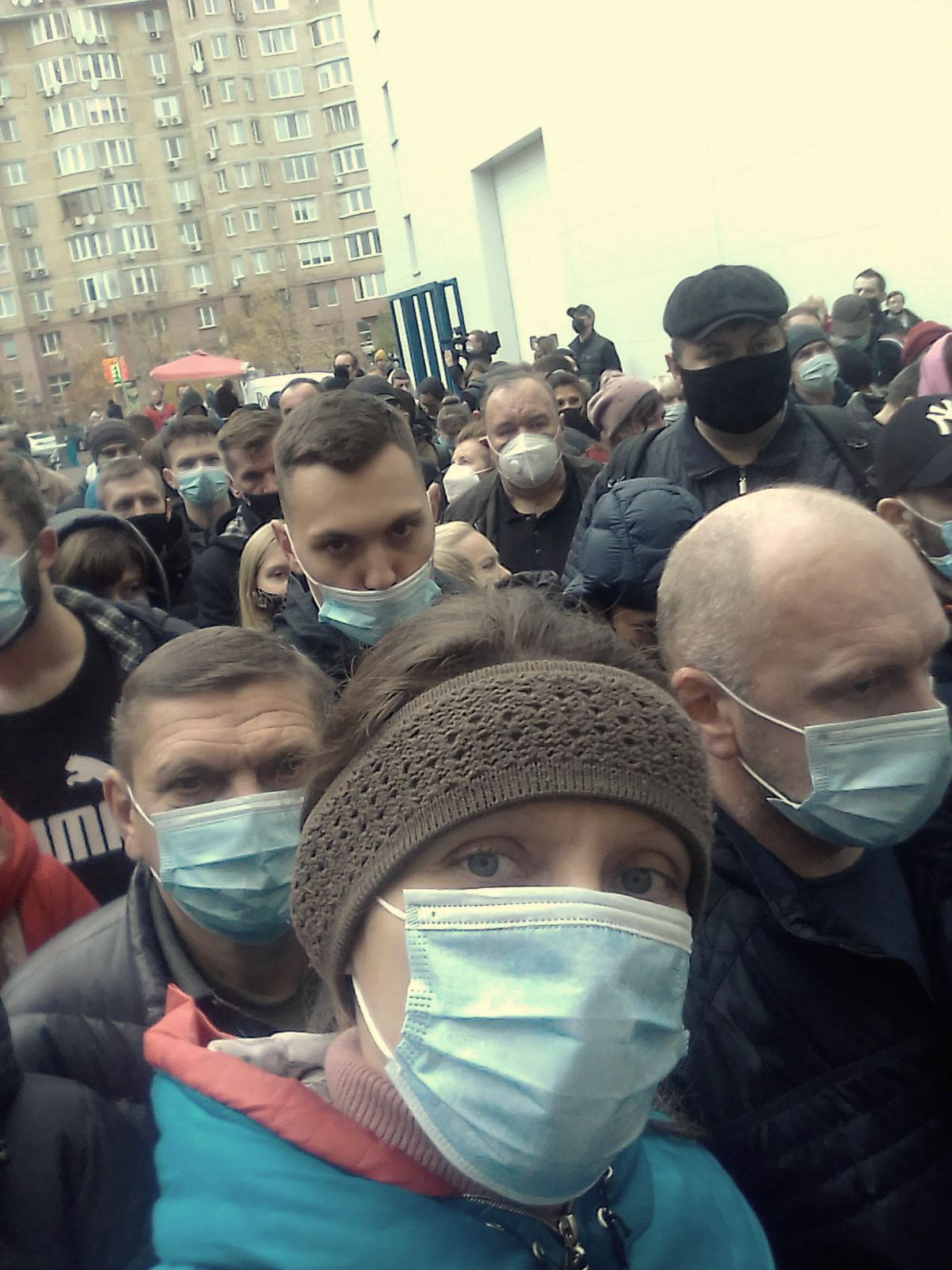
Queue near the IEC vaccination center in Kyiv, November 2021

In mid-August 2021 Ukrainians were vaccinated by 804 mobile teams and in 2,755 fixed vaccination points and in 324 vaccination centers. Late August 2021 982 mobile teams, 2,899 vaccination points and 330 vaccination centers exited in Ukraine. On 3 November 2021 1,082 mobile teams, 3,254 vaccination points, and 421 vaccination centers worked to immunize the population.

In November 2021 most of vaccination centres were observed with long queues. In some cases, the situation was worsened due to electronic queues failure. In November 2021, queues grew up in connection with quarantine announcement 2021.

After the 24 February 2022 Russian invasion of Ukraine 350 mass vaccination centers and a thousand vaccination points and many mobile teams were closed for safety reasons and due to the reorientation of health workers. But the vaccination program continued in all regions of Ukraine, except in Luhansk and Donetsk Oblast.

== Restrictions for non-vaccinated/mandatory vaccination ==
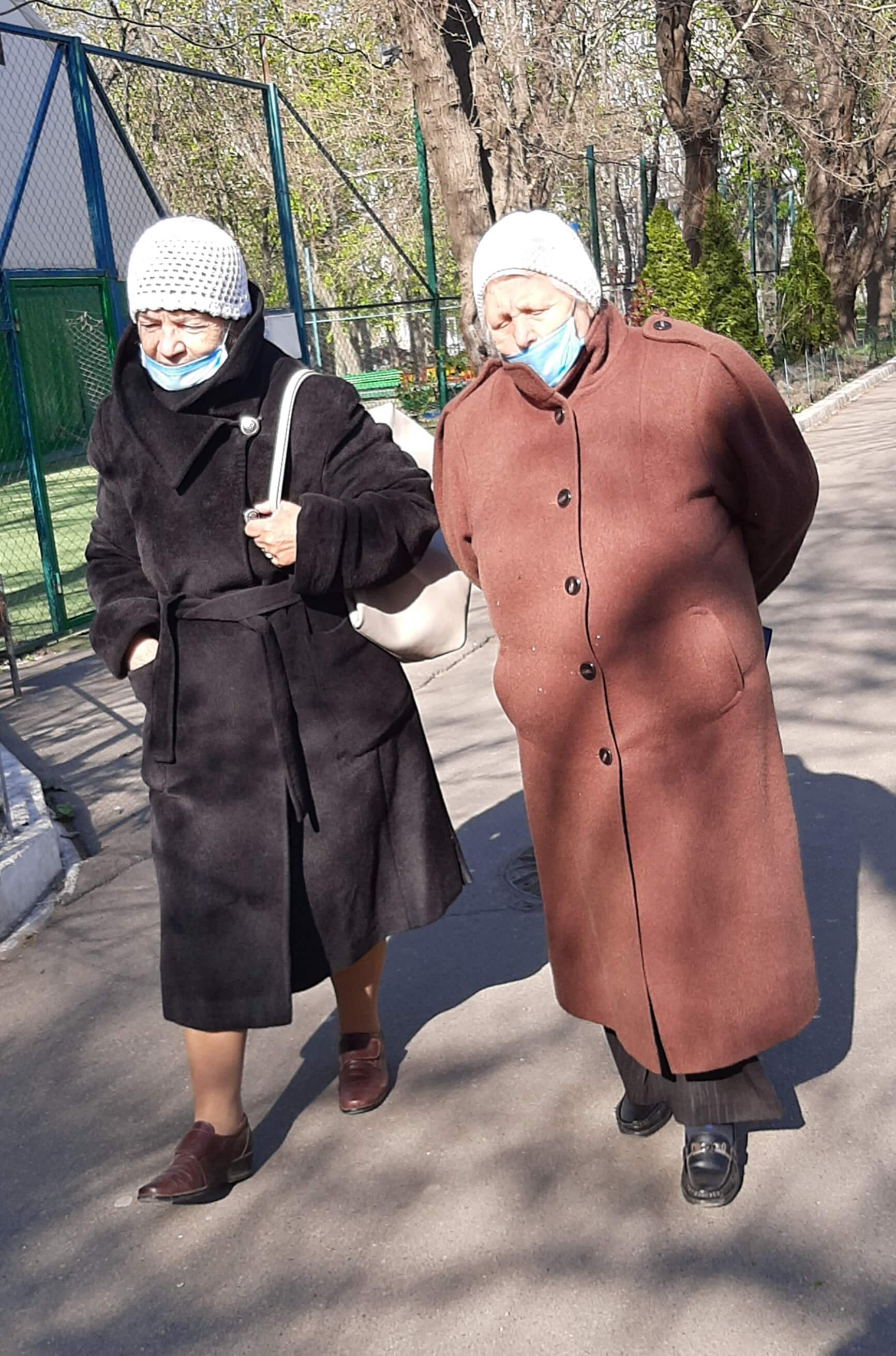
Mandatory wearing of masks in public in Odesa (April 2020)

The Cabinet of Ministers of Ukraine has set four different levels of epidemic danger:

- the "green" zone; where there is a requirement for the mandatory wearing of masks in public buildings and transport
- the "yellow" zone; where (in addition to the mask mode and the need to maintain a distance) mass events with the participation of more than one person per 4 square meters of the area of the premises or territory is prohibited, the congestion of cinemas and other cultural institutions by more than 50% of seats is prohibited, the congestion of gyms and fitness centers with more than one person by 10 square meters is prohibited and the work of educational institutions will be closed, except for those where at least 80% of employees have a "yellow" or "green" COVID certificate
- the "red" epidemiological zone; where it will be prohibited to supply public catering (except for targeted delivery and take-out orders) and shopping and entertainment centers, cinemas, theaters, entertainment establishments, cultural institutions (except for historical and cultural reserves) film and video filming, non-food markets and shops, gyms, swimming pools and fitness centers, educational institutions, mass events (except for official sports events and matches of team playing sports without spectators), hotels, hostels, etc. will be closed;

Business owners can choose to use government proved "yellow" certificates for those who received a single dose of coronavirus vaccine and "green" certificates for those who have received all necessary vaccinations to enforce quarantine rules. Or treat all their clients as "non-vaccinated".

The above-mentioned "colour zone" restrictions will not apply if all staff and all visitors, except those under 18, are fully vaccinated against COVID-19.

On 9 June 2021, all Ukrainian regions were placed in a 'green' quarantine zone. On 23 September 2021 all of Ukraine was set to the "yellow" zone. On 15 October Kherson Oblast was classified as a "red" zone and on 18 October Zaporizhzhia Oblast, Odesa Oblast, Donetsk Oblast and Dnipropetrovsk Oblast were also made a "red" zone. On 23 October Sumy Oblast and on 26 October Rivne Oblast and Mykolaiv Oblast joined them. On 30 October 2021 Zhytomyr Oblast, Ivano-Frankivsk Oblast, Kyiv Oblast, Luhansk Oblast, Lviv Oblast, Khmelnytskyi Oblast and Chernihiv Oblast also become "red" zones. (The city of) Kyiv was placed in the "red" zone on 1 November 2021. On 28 November 2021 only Zakarpattia Oblast, Kirovohrad Oblast, Ternopil Oblast, Kharkiv Oblast and Chernivtsi Oblast were in the yellow zone, Poltava Oblast was in the orange zone, and the rest of the regions had been placed in the red zone. On 23 December 2021 only Zaporizhzhia Oblast and Volyn Oblast remained in the red zone and all other were a yellow zone. 7 days later Zaporizhzhia Oblast and Volyn Oblast also became a yellow zone. One month later (on 29 January 2022) there were two regions (Ivano-Frankivsk Oblast and Rivne Oblast) a red zone, 16 regions (Vinnytsia Oblast, Volyn Oblast, Donetsk Oblast, Zhytomyr Oblast, Zakarpattia Oblast, Zaporizhia Oblast, Luhansk Oblast, Lviv Oblast, Mykolaiv Oblast, Odesa Oblast, Sumy Oblast, Ternopil Oblast, Khmelnytsky Oblast, Cherkasy Oblast, Chernivtsi Oblast and Chernihiv Oblast) were an orange zone and only (the city of) Kyiv, as well as Dnipropetrovsk Oblast, Kyiv Oblast, Kirovohrad Oblast, Poltava Oblast, Kharkiv Oblast and Kherson Oblast regions remained "yellow".

On 22 September 2021 Health Minister Viktor Liashko disclosed that his ministry was planning to approve a list of professions subject to mandatory vaccination (against coronavirus infection). This list was intended to entice more teachers to get vaccinated (49% of education workers had received at least one dose of a COVID-19 vaccine); others on the proposed list (medical workers, the Armed Forces, the Interior Ministry, the National Guard of Ukraine) had already a high rate of vaccinated (80% to 90%). It was decided that education workers had until November 2021 to get vaccinated against COVID-19; if they did not they would be suspended from work for a period of quarantine without pay.
