= Alexander Kvitashvili =

Georgian and Ukrainian politician

- ალექსანდრე კვიტაშვილი Олександр Квіташвілі
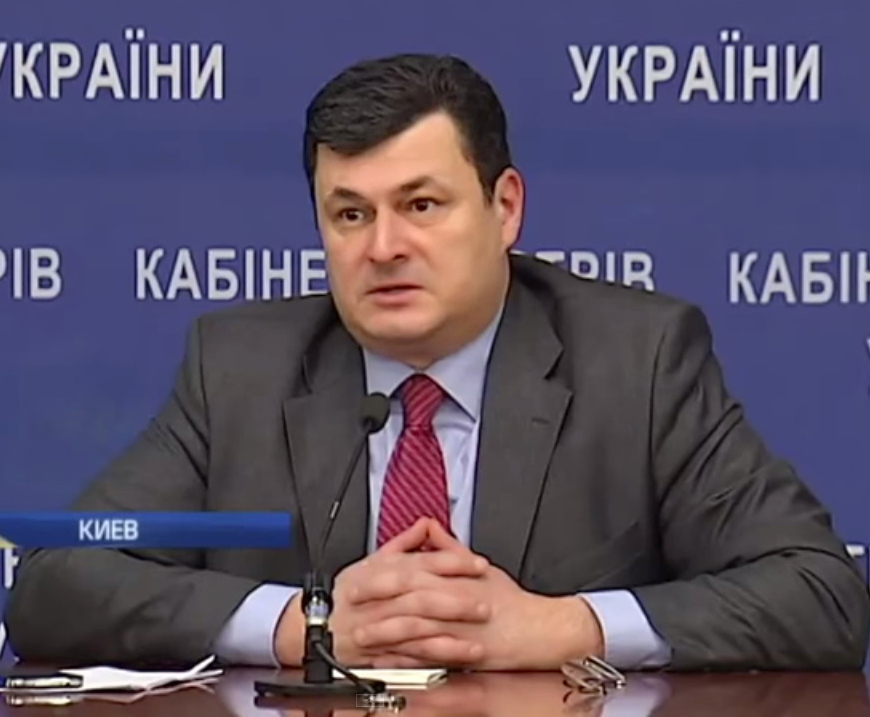
- Kvitashvili in 2015

Minister of Healthcare of Ukraine
- In office 2 December 2014 – 14 April 2016
- Prime Minister: Arseniy Yatsenyuk
- Preceded by: Oleh Musiy
- Succeeded by: Ulana Suprun

Minister of Health, Labour and Social Affairs of Georgia
- In office 31 January 2008 – 31 August 2010
- Prime Minister: Lado Gurgenidze; Grigol Mgaloblishvili; Nika Gilauri
- Preceded by: David Tkeshelashvili
- Succeeded by: Andria Urushadze

Personal details
- Born: 15 November 1970 (age 55) Tbilisi, Georgian SSR, Soviet Union (now Georgia)
- Party: Independent
- Spouse: Nicole Jordania (div. 2017) Anastasiia Ostrovska (m.2018)
- Education: Tbilisi State University; New York University

Alexander "Sandro" Merabovich Kvitashvili (Note: Georgian: ალექსანდრე [სანდრო] კვიტაშვილი; Ukrainian: Олександр Мерабович Квіташвілі, romanized: Oleksandr Merabovych Kvitashvili) (born 15 November 1970) is a Georgian and Ukrainian health manager and government official. He is a former Minister of Healthcare of Ukraine appointed on 2 December 2014 and was granted Ukrainian citizenship the same day. On 14 April 2016 he was relieved of his post. Kvitashvili was Minister of Health of Georgia from 2008 to 2010 and rector of Tbilisi State University (TSU) from 2010 to 2013.

== Education and early career ==
Born in Tbilisi, the capital of then-Soviet Georgia, Kvitashvili graduated from the Tbilisi State University with a degree in history in 1992. In the framework of the Edmund S. Muskie Graduate Fellowship Program, he continued his education at the Robert F. Wagner Graduate School of Public Service and obtained his M.A. in public management in 1993. Having briefly worked for financial and administrative departments at the Grady Memorial Hospital, Kvitashvili returned to Georgia in 1993 and worked for the United Nations Development Programme, United Methodist Committee on Relief, international fund of the Georgian NGO Curatio, and the EastWest Institute. He consulted various international organizations based in Azerbaijan, Latvia, Ukraine, Armenia, and Greece on the education-, healthcare- and social security-related issues.

== Minister of Health ==
=== Georgia ===
On 31 January 2008, Kvitashvili was appointed by the then-President of Georgia Mikheil Saakashvili as Minister of Health, Labour and Social Affairs of Georgia. He resigned on 31 August 2010, citing "a proposal from academic circles" to be an acting rector of the Tbilisi State University, a position he took over in September 2010. He served as an elected Rector of the TSU from 27 December 2010 until his resignation on 12 June 2013.

=== Ukraine ===
On 2 December 2014 Kvitashvili was appointed Minister of Healthcare of Ukraine in the Second Yatsenyuk Government with the hope to reform the country's healthcare system. He was granted the Ukrainian citizenship by President Petro Poroshenko on the same day. "I've been working on reforms in Ukraine for last three months, but my love for this country has much longer history... I accepted proposal to work in the Ukrainian government because of my deep respect towards Ukraine. I am proud to be a citizen of this great nation, which has a great future," Kvitashvili commented on his appointment. Georgia's incumbent Prime Minister Irakli Garibashvili reacted negatively to the appointment, accusing Kvitashvili of "destroying" Georgia's healthcare system.

On 2 July 2015 Kvitashvili wrote a letter of resignation after losing the support of the Petro Poroshenko Bloc in which he stated "If my resignation helps pass bills that are needed to launch reform, I'm ready to leave". The Ukrainian parliament voted against accepting the resignation on 17 September 2015. By 22 December 2015 the Ukrainian parliament had voted four times against accepting the resignation. On 10 December 2015 Kvitashvili stated in an interview with Ukraine Today about the refusal of parliament to accept his resignation "It doesn't matter though, I have been working since July the same hours, with the same effort that I was before". He publicly withdrew his letter of resignation on 4 February 2016. He did not retain his post in the Groysman Government that was installed on 14 April 2016.
