= Raisa Bohatyriova =

Ukrainian politician (born 1953)

- Раїса Богатирьова
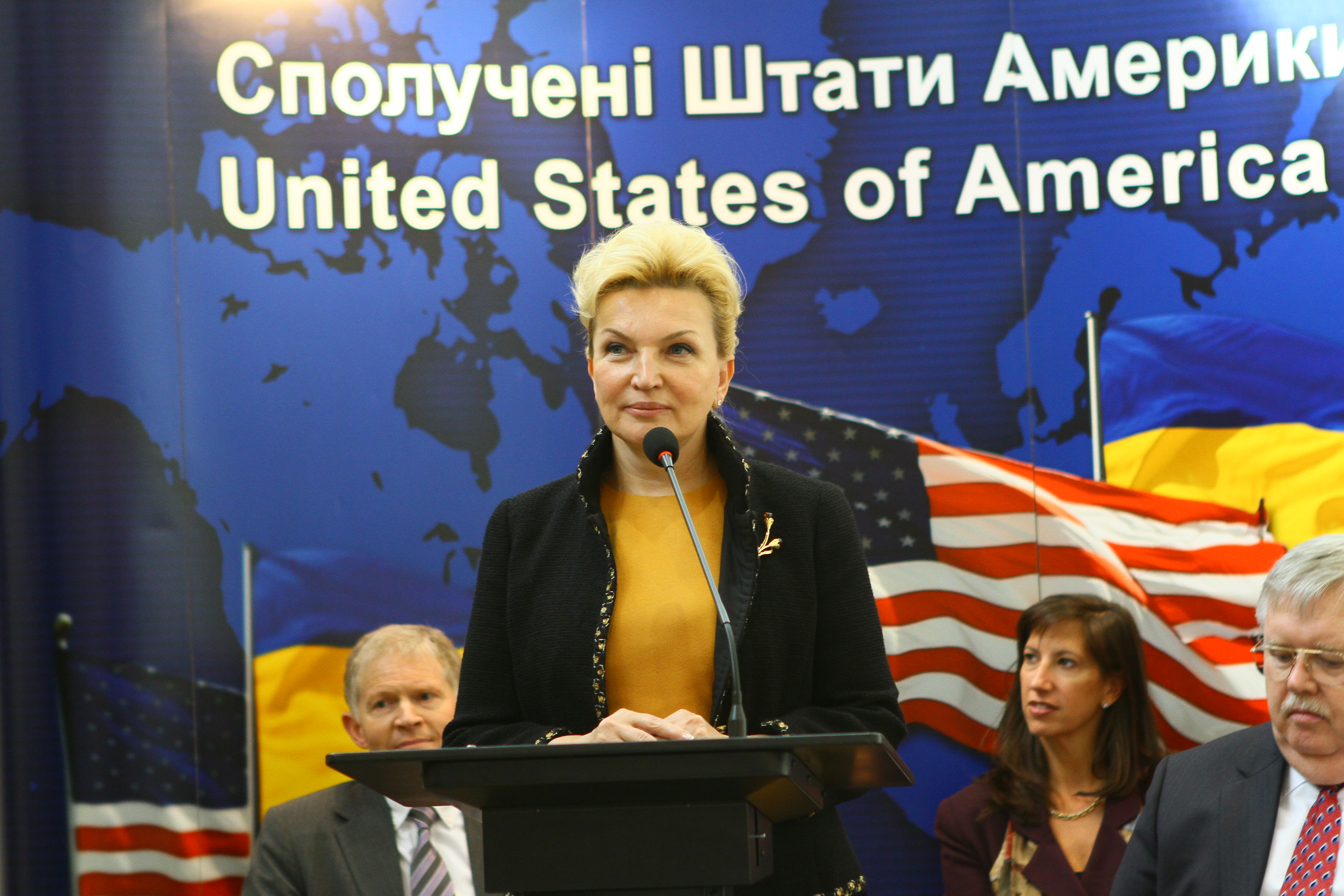
- Bohatyriova in 2013

Minister of Healthcare
- In office February 14, 2012 – February 24, 2014
- Prime Minister: Mykola Azarov
- Preceded by: Oleksandr Anischenko
- Succeeded by: Oleh Musiy

Vice Prime Minister of Ukraine
- In office February 14, 2012 – February 23, 2014
- Prime Minister: Mykola Azarov
- Preceded by: Andriy Klyuyev

11th Secretary of the National Security and Defense Council
- In office December 24, 2007 – February 14, 2012
- President: Viktor Yushchenko; Viktor Yanukovych
- Preceded by: Ivan Pliusch
- Succeeded by: Andriy Klyuyev

6th Minister of Healthcare (Ukraine)
- In office January 1999 – January 2000
- Prime Minister: Valeriy Pustovoitenko; Viktor Yushchenko
- Preceded by: Andriy Serdyuk
- Succeeded by: Vitaliy Moskalenko

People's Deputy of Ukraine
- In office May 15, 1990 – May 12, 1994; July 6, 2000 – May 23, 2008

Personal details
- Born: Raisa Vasylivna Bohatyriova; January 6, 1953 (age 73) Bakal, Chelyabinsk Oblast, Russian SFSR, Soviet Union
- Party: Communist Party of Soviet Union (1977–1991); Socialist Party of Ukraine (1991–2000); Christian Democratic Party of Ukraine (2000); Non-partisan (2000–2001) Party of Regions (2001–2008)
- Spouse: Ihor Bohatyryov
- Children: Ihor and Oleksandr (twins)
- Education: Luhansk Medical Institute (1975), Kharkiv Medical Institute (1977), Kyiv University (1996)
- Occupation: Politician
- Profession: Jurisprudence, law, medicine, professor
- Website: http://www.bogatyrova.org.ua

Raisa Vasylivna Bohatyriova (Ukrainian: Раїса Василівна Богатирьова; Russian: Раиса Васильевна Богатырёва; born January 6, 1953) is a Ukrainian politician and former Vice Prime Minister of Ukraine and Minister of Health and former Secretary of National Security and Defense Council of Ukraine. In the past, Bohatyriova served as a People's Deputy of the Verkhovna Rada (parliament) for the Communist, Christian Democratic Party of Ukraine and, more recently, the Party of Regions.

In October 2014, the Ukrainian authorities added Bohatyriova's name to their wanted list as a suspect of large-scale embezzlement of state budget funds. According to the Ukrainian government, she has since repaid government funds that had allegedly been misappropriated. At the time her whereabouts were unknown. On August 27, 2019, Bohatyriova returned to Ukraine.

According to the Ukrainian magazine Focus, Bohatyriova has placed among the top 10 most influential women in Ukraine from 2005 to 2010 (five years). She was recognized as the second most influential woman in 2006–2008 after Yulia Tymoshenko.

== Biography ==
Bohatyriova was born on January 6, 1953, in the town of Bakal, Chelyabinsk Oblast, of the Russian SFSR (then the Soviet Union), to a family of workers. She was born on the day of Christmas Eve, according to Eastern Orthodox Christianity. Her father is Vasyl Petrovych Laktionov (1912–1985), and her mother – is Hanna Markivna Laktionova (born 1918). Bohatyriova has two older sisters Valentyna and Vira. On her website, she claims that her family is from the village of Protopopivka in Kharkiv Oblast. Bohatyriova also stated that her ancestors are from Sloboda Ukraine.

Bohatyriova married her husband sometime in 1975. Her husband, Ihor Oleksandrovych was a student at the Kharkiv Aviation Institute. Bohatyriova sympathized with Margaret Thatcher and reads Winston Churchill and Anton Chekhov.

In 1971 Bohatyriova enrolled at the Luhansk Medical Institute. In 1977 she graduated from Kharkiv Medical Institute with merits gaining a doctorate qualification. In 1996 graduated from Kyiv University, specializing in Jurisprudence, qualifications – Lawyer, Medical Doctor, and professor. Her candidate dissertation, Optimal System of Mass Ultrasound Screening of the Pregnant, she defended in the Kharkiv National Medical University in 1996. In 2000 Bohatyriova defended her doctorate dissertation, Role of Inborn and Inherited Pathology in Reproductive Losses of a Family, in the same university.

=== Career ===
1970–1971	Seamstress at Kramatorsk Garment Factory
1977–1979	Internship at the City Hospital No. 2 in Gorlovka
1979–1980	Obstetrician-gynecologist at the 3rd Medico-Sanitary Department at the Novokramatorsk Engineering Plant in Kramatorsk
1980–1990	Obstetrician-gynecologist; Head of Trade-Union Committee; Deputy Head Physician at the Kramatorsk Central Municipal Hospital

From 1997 to 2003, Bohatyriova was the Secretary of the supervisory board at the National Fund of Social Protection for Mothers and Children Ukraine to Children.

=== Political career ===
Bohatyriova was a member of the Communist Party of Soviet Union and a member of the organizing committee in the creation of the Socialist Party of Ukraine. She was elected to the Verkhovna Rada by the members of the Kramatorsk city hospital as a people's deputy, a duty she accepted on May 15, 1990. On her website, Bohatyriova claims that her initial experience in the Verkhovna Rada gave her a real sense of the Ukrainian language. In March 1994, Bohatyriova was not re-elected, yet was appointed a Deputy of Minister of Health Security. She made a career in this position, working her way up to be appointed Minister of the portfolio on January 27, 1999. On January 12, 2000, Bohatyriova was deposed as a Minister of Health Security when the Prime Minister of Ukraine was appointed, Viktor Yushchenko. However, in a few months, she was appointed a science adviser to the President of Ukraine.

In July 2000, Bohatyriova was again elected to the parliament as a member of the Christian Democratic Party of Ukraine. She left her faction once she became a people's deputy and was unaffiliated until March 2001. In March 2001, Bohatyriova joined the Regions of Ukraine group and, in November, its faction. In April 2002, she was re-elected by the United Ukraine block as the leader of the Party of Regions. Bohatyriova was re-elected in April 2006 as the Party of Regions member, placing sixth on the party list. From July 2006 until February 2007, she was a member of the Budget Committee.

In November 2007, during the all-national reelections, Bohatyriova again became a member of the Verkhovna Rada from the Party of Region. On December 24, 2007, she received an appointment from the President of Ukraine to head the Secretariat of the National Security and Defense Council of Ukraine. On January 28, 2008, the administration of the Party of Regions excluded her from the party's list.

On February 14, 2012, Bohatyriova was removed from the National Security and Defense Council of Ukraine and appointed Minister of Health.

On February 24, 2014, just after the "Maidan revolution," the Verkhovna Rada dismissed Bohatyriova.

== Criminal proceedings against Bohatyriova ==
=== United States ===
In 2008, both Dmitry Itkin (Russian: Дмитрий Иткин; born October 23, 1963) and Viktor Naishuller (Russian: Виктор Найшулер; born 1956 Murmansk), who are very close to Semion Mogilevich, assisted Raisa Bohatyriova with numerous suspicious real estate purchases and alleged money laundering through the La Jolla, California based firm Ideal Real Estate.

=== Ukraine ===
On October 20, 2014, Bohatyriova was declared a suspect in the large-scale embezzlement of ₴6 million in budget funds. The next day she was placed on the wanted list, and the court ordered the seizure of three apartments in Kyiv, one apartment in Yalta, and three houses in (the village) Pidhirtsi (in Obukhiv Raion) owned by she and her husband.

Early March 2014, the European Union froze all funds belonging to Bohatyriova because they also suspected her of illegal use of budget funds. On January 12, 2015, Interpol published an international red notice again Bohatyriova as wanted for corruption and charges of "misappropriation, embezzlement or conversion of property by malversation." According to the Ukrainian government, she has since repaid government funds that had been allegedly misappropriated. For this, her funds in the EU were unfrozen.

In the years following the 2014 Ukrainian revolution, Bohatyriova's whereabouts were unknown. On August 27, 2019, Bohatyriova returned to Ukraine and was immediately detained by the police. She was released from the pre-trial detention center two days later after Vadym Novynskyi had posted bail for her.

== Awards and titles ==
- Order of Princess Olga, III class (2002)
- An awardee of the State Prize of Ukraine in science and technology (1999)
- Honored Doctor of Ukraine (2001)
- Honorary citizen of Donetsk Oblast (2007)

== See also ==
- 2007 Ukrainian parliamentary election
- List of Ukrainian Parliament Members 2007
- National Security and Defense Council of Ukraine
