= Special State Protection Service of Georgia =

Special State Protection Service სახელმწიფო დაცვის სპეციალური სამსახური
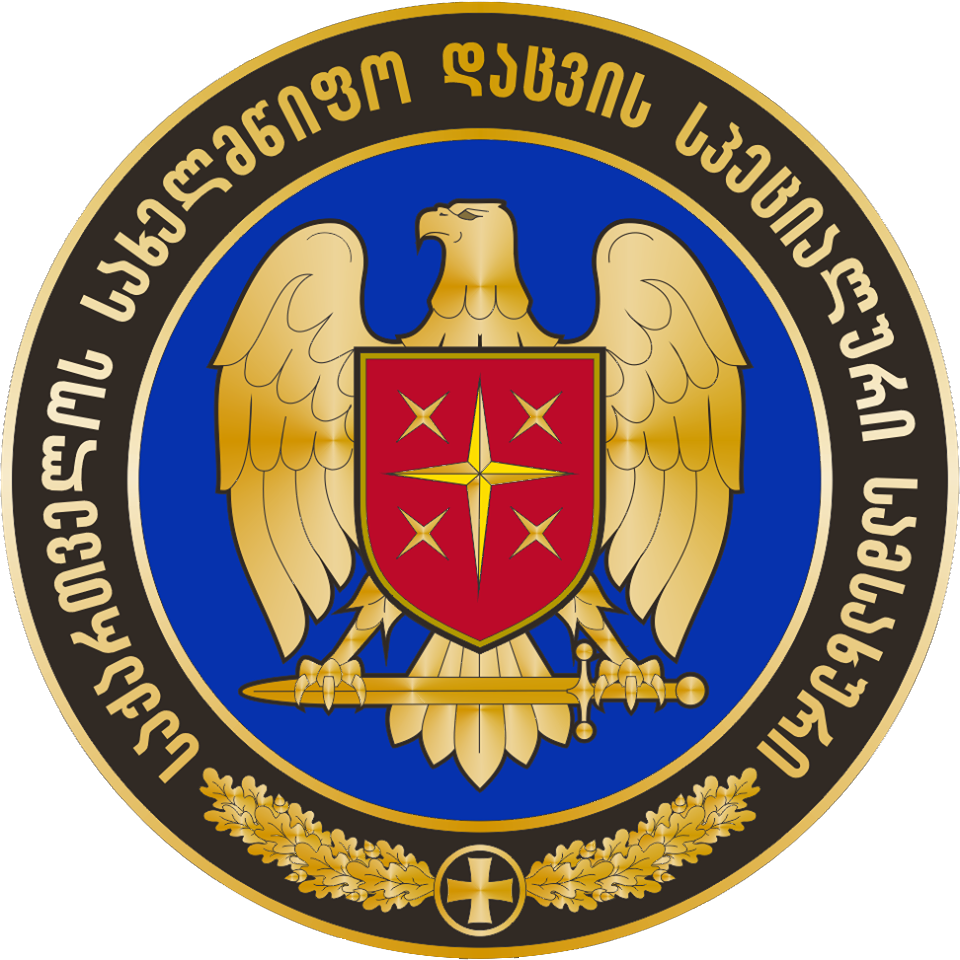
- SSPS coat of arms

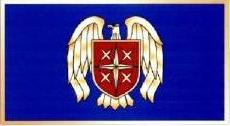
- SSPS flag
- Abbreviation: SSPS

Agency overview
- Formed: June 23, 1994

Jurisdictional structure
- Operations jurisdiction: Georgia (country)|Georgia
- Specialist jurisdiction: Protection of international or domestic VIPs, protection of significant state assets

Operational structure
- Headquarters: 2 April 9 St., Tbilisi, Georgia
- Agency executive: Anzor Chubinidze, Head of the Special State Protection Service

Website
- www.ssps.gov.ge

The Special State Protection Service of Georgia (SSPS; Georgian: საქართველოს სახელმწიფო დაცვის სპეციალური სამსახური [სდსს], sakartvelos sakhelmtsipo datsvis spetsialuri samsakhuri) is a militarized government agency of Georgia tasked with the protection of several, mandated by the relevant law, high-ranking state officials, as well as certain national properties, high-ranking foreign visitors and diplomatic offices. SSPS is fully subordinated to the Government, the head of the agency is appointed by and reports directly to the Prime Minister.

== History ==
The predecessor of the Special State Protection Service was the Government Protective Service of the Republic of Georgia (საქართველოს რესპუბლიკის სამთავრობო დაცვის სამსახური) formed on June 23, 1994, on the basis of the Government Protective Directorate of the Ministry of State Security of Georgia. On February 20, 1996, the agency adopted the current name in line with the "Law of Georgia on Special State Protection Service".

In 1998, the SSPS was further tasked with providing security to the ongoing energy projects in Georgia, such as the Baku–Tbilisi–Ceyhan pipeline. This function was transferred to the Main Division for Protection of Strategic Pipelines of the Ministry of Internal Affairs on January 1, 2006.

The agency has lost 7 personnel in the line of duty. Of these, two were killed in the attack on the then-President Eduard Shevardnadze's motorcade in Tbilisi on February 9, 1998.

=== Heads of the service ===
- Lieutenant-General Vakhtang Kutateladze, 1994–1998
- Lieutenant-General Sulkhan Papashvili, 1998–2003
- Major-General Giorgi Aleksidze, 2003–2004
- Lieutenant-General Otar Kvelidze, 2004–2010
- Major-General Teimuraz Janashia, 2010–2013
- Vice-Colonel Anzor Chubinidze, 2013–2014
- Colonel Teimuraz Mghebrishvili, 2014
- Lieutenant-General Anzor Chubinidze, 2015–present

== Functions ==
The Special State Protection Service provides security to:

- the leading officials from executive, legislative and judiciary bodies of Georgia,
- the buildings, structures and the adjoining territories belonging to the government of Georgia,
- the visiting high-ranking foreign officials, representatives of the international organisations, and other important persons,
- the places, temporary or permanent, where the Georgian government or officials reside.

The persons subjected to protection are:

- President of Georgia
- Prime Minister of Georgia
- Chairperson of the Parliament of Georgia
- Chairperson of the Constitutional Court of Georgia
- Chairperson of the Supreme Court of Georgia
- Catholicos-Patriarch of the Georgian Orthodox Church
- Heads of the supreme legislative and executive authority of Abkhazia and Adjara
- Head of the Administration of the Government of Georgia
- Permanent members of the National Security Council of Georgia
- Heads of foreign states, visiting Georgia

By decision of the Prime Minister of Georgia, personal security may by provided to:

- Deputy Chairperson of the Parliament of Georgia, members of the Parliament, members of the Government, other high-ranking officials as well as their family members if the evidence suggests threat to their lives and health;
- Highest-ranking foreign officials and representatives of international organizations;
- Heads of diplomatic missions to Georgia;
- Family members of former high-ranking officials as mandated by a special law.
