= David Tkeshelashvili =

Georgian politician (born 1969)

- დავით ტყეშელაშვილი
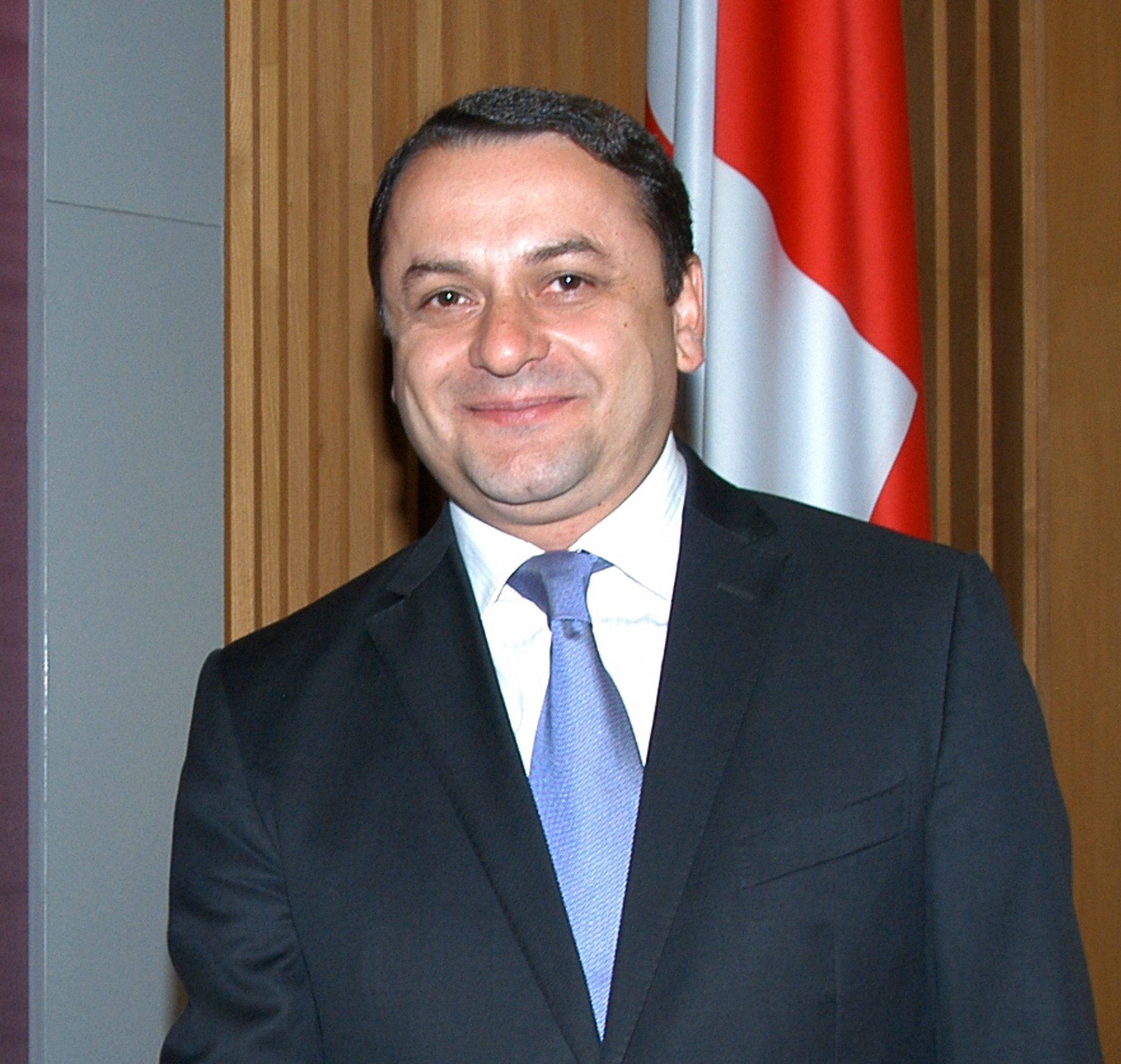

Head of the Presidential Administration of Georgia
- In office 25 June 2010 – 23 April 2013
- President: Mikheil Saakashvili
- Preceded by: Teimuraz Janashia
- Succeeded by: Andro Barnovi

Minister of Regional Development and Infrastructure
- In office 31 January 2008 – 25 June 2010

Minister of Health, Labour and Social Affairs
- In office 2006–2007

Minister of Environment Protection and Natural Resources
- In office 2006–2007

Personal details
- Born: 16 October 1969 (age 56) Tbilisi, Georgia
- Website: Government of Georgia

David Tkeshelashvili (Georgian: დავით ტყეშელაშვილი; born 16 October 1969) is a Georgian politician who served as the Head of Presidential Administration of Georgia.

== Early years ==
Tkeshelashvili was born on 16 October 1969 in Tbilisi, Georgia. From 1987-1989, he served in the Soviet Army. After the dissolution of the Soviet Union, he worked as the head, political secretary and deputy chairman of the Regional Department of the Citizens' Union's Youth Branch from 1993-1995, serving as the organization's press secretary from 1994 to 1995. In 1995, he was elected to the Georgian Parliament becoming deputy majority leader. A year later, Tkeshelashvili graduated from Tbilisi State University with a degree in Law.

From 1998-2002, he was the chairman of the youth branch of the Citizen's Union.

In 1999, he was re-elected to the parliament, working as chairman of the Subcommittee for Relations with Media and Non-governmental Organizations of the Human Rights Committee from 1999 through 2003. In 2004, Tkeshelashvili was re-elected as MP for the third term from National Movement - Democrats. The following year, he won Edmund S. Muskie scholarship, subsequently obtaining LLM from Emory University in 2006. At the university, he was conferred with Sheth Distinguished International Alumni Award.

== Political career ==
In 2006-2007, Tkeshelashvili served as the Minister of Environment Protection and Natural Resources. As the minister, he was able to sign park partnership agreements with the US government which ensured financial and technical assistance to Georgia and the establishment of a sister-park relationship between Point Reyes and Kolkheti National Park. In 2007-2008, he was Minister of Health, Labour and Social Affairs. On 31 January 2008, he was appointed Minister of Regional Development and Infrastructure.

After 2009, David Tkeshelashvili continued serving in Georgia’s government as First Deputy Prime Minister and Minister of Regional Development and Infrastructure until 2010. He subsequently served as Chief of Staff of President Mikheil Saakashvili from 2010 to 2013. After leaving government, he pursued work in international legal affairs, consulting, and policy advisory organisations. He later joined the advisory board of StrategEast and the Supervisory Board of American University Kyiv.

== See also ==
- Cabinet of Georgia
