= Oleh Musiy =

Ukrainian medic, activist, and politician

- Олег Мусій
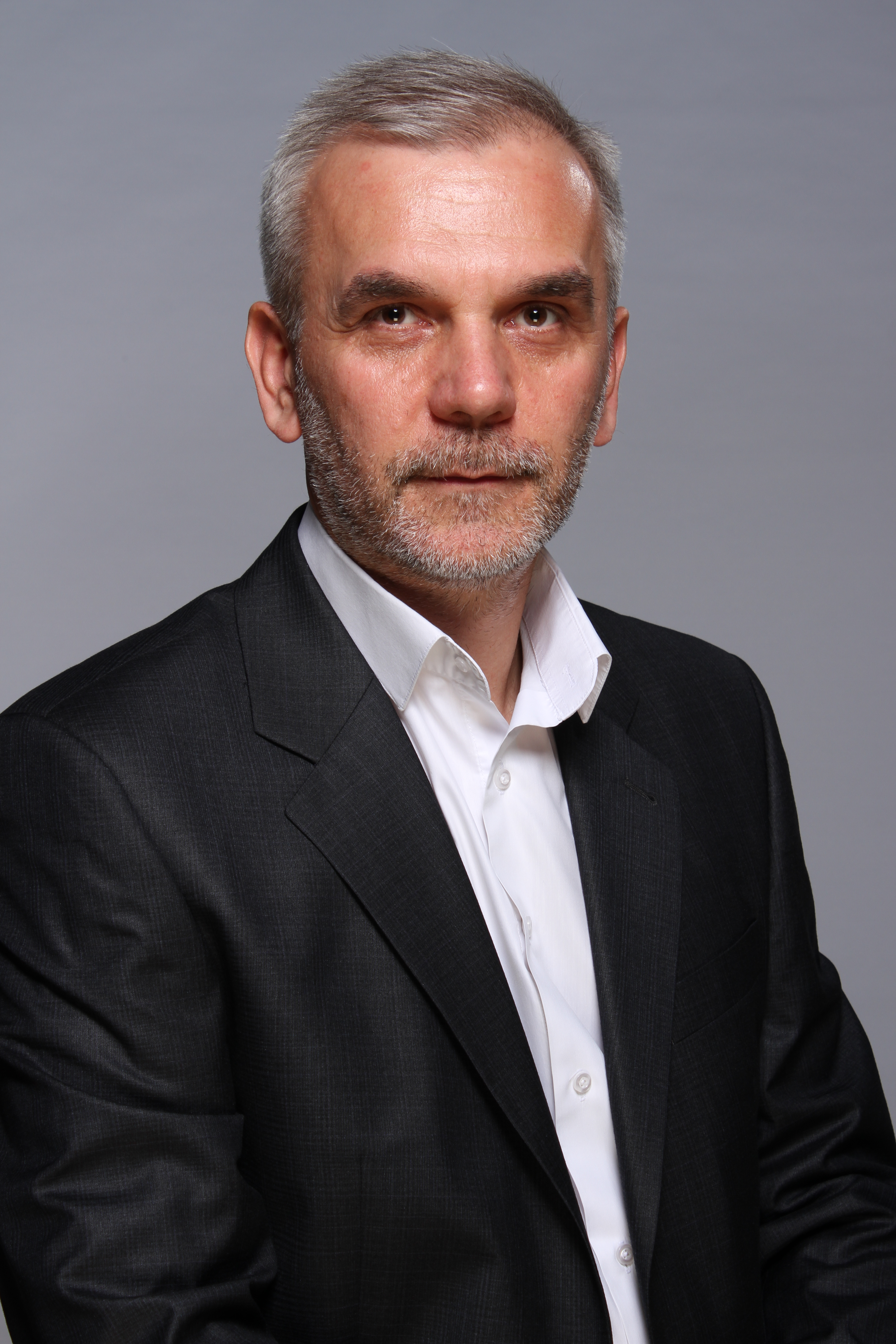
- Musiy in 2014

People's Deputy of Ukraine
- In office 27 November 2014 – 29 August 2019
- Preceded by: Stepan Kurpil
- Succeeded by: Yuriy Kamelchuk
- Constituency: Lviv Oblast, No. 124

18th Minister of Healthcare of Ukraine
- In office 27 February 2014 – 2 December 2014
- President: Petro Poroshenko
- Prime Minister: Arseniy Yatsenyuk
- Preceded by: Raisa Bohatyryova
- Succeeded by: Alexander Kvitashvili

Personal details
- Born: 12 May 1965 (age 61) Perespa, Ukrainian SSR, Soviet Union (now Ukraine)
- Party: Independent (since 2015)
- Other political affiliations: Petro Poroshenko Bloc (2014–2015)
- Education: Bogomolets National Medical University Of Ukraine; P.L. Shupyk National Medical Academy of Postgraduate Education

Oleh Stepanovych Musiy (Ukrainian: Олег Степанович Мусій; born 12 May 1965) is a Ukrainian medic, social activist, organizer of the medical service at Euromaidan, Minister of Healthcare of Ukraine in Yatsenyuk Government from 27 February 2014 till 2 December 2014. On 1 October he was dismissed from his post "for failure to ensure tender procurements of required medicines". In July 2014 Musiy had complained about his lack of power to dismiss some of his deputies appointed by exiled former President Viktor Yanukovych's son Oleksandr Yanukovych: "I kept saying: do something, because people like these have to be in jail".

In the 2014 Ukrainian parliamentary election, Musiy was re-elected into parliament as an independent candidate from Ukraine's 124th electoral district situated in the Sokal with 29.86% of the votes.

He was formerly a member of the Petro Poroshenko Bloc until 18 September 2015.

In the 2019 Ukrainian parliamentary election Musiy did not manage to get elected (as an independent candidate) to parliament. In the 124th electoral district, in Chervonohrad he became only the sixth with a result of 9.55%. Yuriy Kamelchuk, a candidate from the Servant of the People won with 16.08%.
