= Protopopivka =

Protopopivka (Ukrainian: Протопопівка) may refer to several places in Ukraine:

- Protopopivka, Kharkiv Raion, Kharkiv Oblast
- Protopopivka, Izium Raion, Kharkiv Oblast
- Protopopivka, Odesa Oblast
- Protopopivka, Kirovohrad Oblast
