= Yuriy Kamelchuk =

Ukrainian politician

- Юрій Камельчук
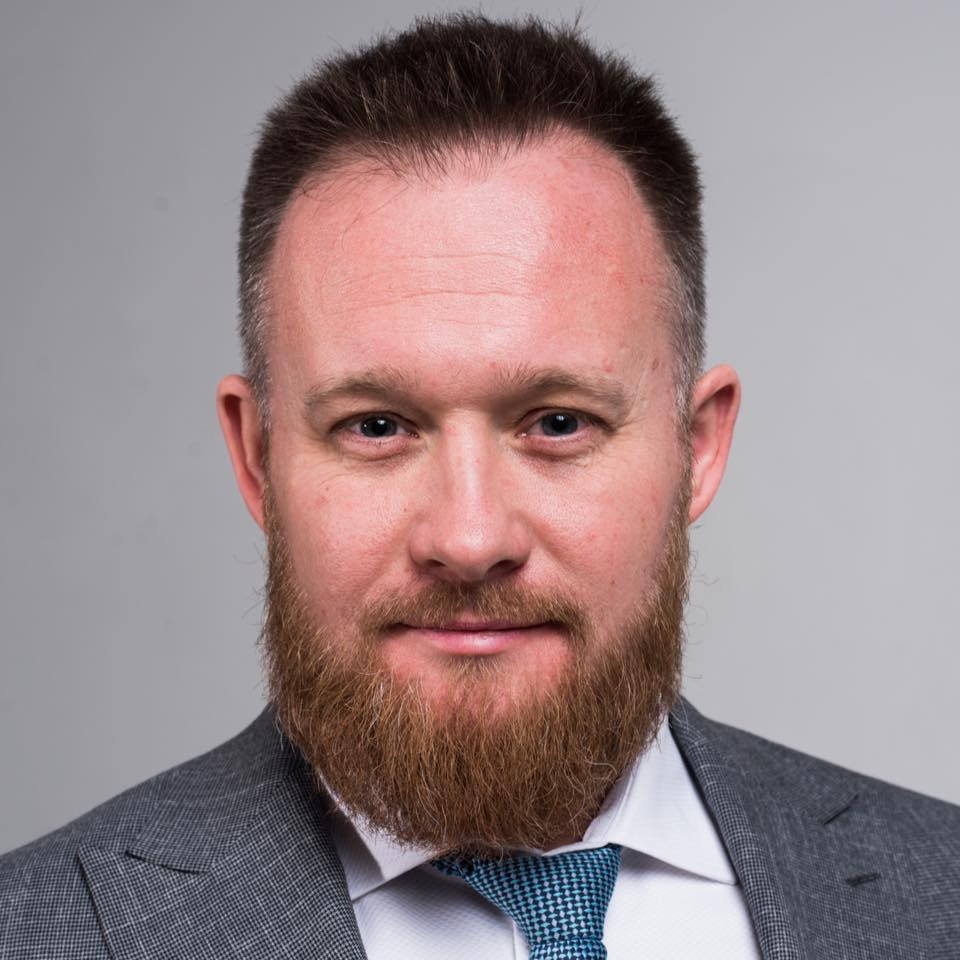

People's Deputy of Ukraine
- Incumbent
- Assumed office 29 August 2019
- Preceded by: Oleh Musiy
- Constituency: Lviv Oblast, No. 124

Personal details
- Born: 12 February 1980 (age 46) Lviv, Ukrainian SSR, Soviet Union (now Ukraine)
- Party: Servant of the People

Yuriy Oleksandrovych Kamelchuk (Ukrainian: Юрій Олександрович Камельчук; born 12 February 1980) is a Ukrainian politician who represents the Servant of the People party in the Verkhovna Rada (Ukraine's parliament).

== Biography ==
He graduated from the journalism faculty of Ivan Franko National University of Lviv, and studied business experience and public space management in Singapore, Israel, Sweden, Poland and Spain.

He got a master's degree at Taras Shevchenko National University of Kyiv on the specialty of ‘Public Management and Administration’ in 2021.

== Parliament activity ==
In 2019 parliamentary elections was a candidate for people's deputies from the political party ‘Servant of the People’ in the 125th electoral district. As a result, won the election with 16,5% of the votes. Date of gaining deputy's authority: August 2019. Member of the Verkhovna Rada of Ukraine Committee on Energy, Housing and Utilities Services. Alternative member of the Permanent Delegation in Parliamentary Assembly of the Council of Europe. On 12 December 2019 joined inter-faction group ‘Humanna kraina’ established at the initiative of UAnimals to promote humanistic values and protect animals from cruelty.
