= Andriy Serdyuk =

Ukrainian politician and medical scientist (1938–2026)

- Андрій Сердюк

Minister of Healthcare
- In office 5 September 1996 – 27 January 1999
- Preceded by: Yevhen Korolenko
- Succeeded by: Raisa Bohatyryova

Personal details
- Born: Andriy Mykhailovych Serdyuk; 24 December 1938 Dnipropetrovsk, Ukraine, Soviet Union
- Died: 15 March 2026 (aged 87) Kyiv, Ukraine

Andriy Mykhailovych Serdyuk (Ukrainian: Андрій Михайлович Сердюк; 24 December 1938 – 15 March 2026) was a Ukrainian medical scientist and politician.

== Life and career ==
Serdyuk was born in Dnipropetrovsk on 24 December 1938. He served as the Minister of Healthcare from 1996 to 1999.

Serdyuk died on 15 March 2026, at the age of 87.

== Controversy ==
The resignation of Serdyuk from the post of President of the National Academy of Medical Sciences of Ukraine in 2013 was demanded by activists of public organizations helping people with AIDS. They accused Serdyuk of the previous closure of the Lavra clinic and allegedly spoiling a large batch of antiviral drugs. In the winter of 2014, activists forced him to write a letter of resignation, but Serdyuk withdrew it as made under pressure. Later, a criminal case was opened against Serdyuk for embezzlement of funds on a large scale.

== Awards ==
- Orders of Prince Yaroslav the Wise of the V class, "Badge of Honor", "For Merit" of the III class.
