= Andria Urushadze =

Andria Urushadze ანდრია ურუშაძე

Minister of Health, Labour and Social Affairs of Georgia
- In office 10 September 2010 – 15 March 2012
- President: Mikheil Saakashvili
- Preceded by: Alexander Kvitashvili
- Succeeded by: Zurab Tchiaberashvili

Personal details
- Born: 25 April 1968 (age 58) Tbilisi, Georgia

Andria Urushadze (Georgian: ანდრია ურუშაძე; born 25 April 1968) is a Georgian politician who served as the Minister of Health, Labour and Social Affairs of Georgia from 10 September 2010 to 15 March 2012.

== Early years ==
Urushadze was born on 25 April 1968 in Tbilisi, Georgia. In 1993, he graduated from the General Medicine Department of Tbilisi State Medical University. In 1993–1994, he took post graduate courses in Endocrinology at the same institution. In 1997, he completed studies at the School of Governance. He then completed Special Training Course for Executive Managers of Insurance Companies in Switzerland in 1998. From 1993 through 1995, he was the Vice-President of Georgian Youth International Foundation. Between 1995 and 1997, Urushadze was the head of the International Programs Implementation Bureau at the State Chancellery of Georgia. From 1997 until 2005, he was the Executive Director of Insurance Company Aldagi.

== Political career ==
In September 2005, Urushadze was appointed head of the Healthcare Department at the Ministry of Labor, Health and Social Affairs of Georgia. In October 2006, he became Health Policy Expert for the same ministry as per contracts signed with the World Health Organization and the World Bank. In October 2007, he was appointed as the Director of the Social Service Agency of Georgia. On 13 August 2010, he was nominated as the Minister of Labor, Health and Social Affairs of Georgia, and on 10 September 2012 he assumed the office. On 15 March 2012 he was appointed deputy mayor of Tbilisi in charge of social issues, being succeeded in his ministerial position by Zurab Tchiaberashvili.

Urushadze has authored scientific publications, including "Key Principles of Georgian Health and Social Policy". In addition to native Georgian, he speaks English and Russian. He is married and has two children.

== See also ==
- List of Georgians
- Cabinet of Georgia
