= Teimuraz Janashia =

Georgian security officer and politician

Teimuraz Janashia General

Member of the Parliament of Georgia
- Incumbent
- Assumed office 11 December 2020

Head of the Special State Protection Service of Georgia
- In office 24 June 2010 – 25 February 2013
- President: Mikheil Saakashvili
- Preceded by: Otar Kvelidze
- Succeeded by: Anzor Chubinidze

Head of the Administration of the President of Georgia
- In office 26 November 2009 – June 2010
- President: Mikheil Saakashvili
- Preceded by: Ekaterina Sharashidze
- Succeeded by: David Tkeshelashvili

Personal details
- Born: June 20, 1969 (age 57) Tbilisi (Georgian SSR)
- Party: United National Movement
- Education: Georgian Technical University; Tbilisi State University

Teimuraz Janashia (Georgian: თეიმურაზ ჯანაშია; born June 20, 1969) is a Georgian security officer and politician, former head of the Special State Protection Service in 2010–2013 and a member of the Parliament of Georgia since 2020.

== Early life and education ==
Teimuraz Janashia was born on June 20, 1969, in Tbilisi, at the time the capital of Soviet Georgia. After being drafted into the Soviet Army in 1987, he graduated in 1993 from the Georgian Technical University in highway and airfield engineering. In 1999, he received a Master's degree from Tbilisi State University's Faculty of Law.

== In security services ==
Teimuraz Janashia first joined the Government Protective Service of the Republic of Georgia upon its creation in 1994, originally serving in the Foreign Dignitaries Division before joining the Legislative, Executive and Judiciary Protection Division in 1996, just as the agency was restructured to become the Special State Protection Service (SSPS). In 2000, he became a leading security agent in the detail of State Minister Giorgi Arsenishvili, before being promoted to the detail of President Eduard Shevardnadze.

Janashia remained in the presidential security detail after the Rose Revolution that saw the resignation of Eduard Shevardnadze, staying on board for interim President Nino Burjanadze and her successor, President Mikheil Saakashvili. In 2004, he was appointed to head Saakashvili's personal security, a post he kept until 2009. As such, his term was marked by the 2008 Russo-Georgian War.

Teimuraz Janashia was awarded the Medal for Cavalry in 2007, the Honored SSPS Employee Badge in 2007, and the Order of Vakhtang Gorgasali, I Rank in 2013.

== Chief of State Security ==
On November 26, 2009, President Saakashvili appointed Teimuraz Janashia as head of his administration, some observers as "surprising" the choice of his head of security to lead his staff. Janashia remained on the post for a few months and on June 24, 2010, he was appointed as Head of the Special State Protection Service, in charge of the country's state security apparatus, with the rank of Major-General, replacing Otar Kvelidze. He would be dismissed following the victory of Georgian Dream in the 2012 parliamentary election by Prime Minister Bidzina Ivanishvili, after which he briefly served as a presidential adviser in the last months of the Saakashvili presidency.

In 2014, the Prosecutor's Office opened an investigation into controversial expenditures done on behalf of President Saakashvili by the SSPS from September 2009 to February 2013, amounting to up to 9 million GEL. According to prosecutors, the sum, which included a 6 million GEL transfer from the Presidential Reserve Fund to the SSPS, was used to secretly cover expensive clothes, aesthetic procedures, luxury items, and personal travel costs for the President and his close allies, in violation of the Law on State Secrets. This case remains known as the "Suits Affair" and features Janashia as a co-defendant along with Saakashvili. The latter has been serving a controversial six-year prison sentence since October 2021 over the case, while Janashia saw his bank accounts and private properties seized in 2014. The confiscation of his assets, including his pension as a former SSPS head, without a court ruling has led to debates on the constitutionality of the enforcement. Briefly arrested in 2014, Janashia was released on bail.

Janashia has maintained his innocence in the case and called the prosecution "absurd", as most of the expenditures cited by the State were arguably used for presidential or diplomatic expenses. In 2022, former President Saakashvili appealed to incumbent President Salome Zourabichvili to declassify SSPS expenditure files and exonerate Janashia, although the government has not done so to this day. Legal experts have discussed the political overtones of the case, as prosecutors have refused the defense's request to call Anzor Chubinidze, current head of the SSPS and a high-ranking official in the agency in 2009-2013, as a witness.

== In opposition to Georgian Dream ==
During the 2020 parliamentary election, Teimuraz Janashia was included in the electoral list of Strength Is in Unity, an electoral bloc led by the United National Movement. Though he won a seat in Parliament, he was among 49 MPs to refuse to recognize the results after allegations of massive voter fraud surfaced and joined Parliament only in May 2021 after a short-lived EU-facilitated agreement between Georgian Dream and the opposition. As a Member of Parliament, he serves on the Defense and Security Committee and in the Trust Group, a parliamentary special committee in charge of overseeing confidential defense expenditures.

A strong supporter of Ukraine in the face of the 2022-2023 Russian invasion, he visited Kyiv on April 18, 2022, meeting with local officials and Georgian volunteers fighting with Ukraine.

In the 2021 local elections, Janashia was nominated by UNM to run for Mayor of the Martvili Municipality, running against Georgian Dream's Tornike Janashia and For Georgia's Lasha Lekishvili. He was endorsed by another opposition party, European Georgia, and secured a place in the runoffs against the GD nominee. During the campaign, Prime Minister Irakli Gharibashvili campaigned against him, accusing Janashia of "unknown intentions" in Martvili. He would be defeated after winning 48.2% of the vote.
