= Protopopivka, Kharkiv Raion, Kharkiv Oblast =

Protopopivka Протопопівка
- Village
- Protopopivka
- Interactive map of Protopopivka
- Coordinates: 50°01′42″N 35°50′13″E
- Country: Ukraine
- Oblast: Kharkiv Oblast
- Raion: Kharkiv Raion

Population (1864)
  - Total: 280

Protopopivka (Ukrainian: Протопо́півка) is a village in northeast Ukraine, located in Kharkiv Raion of Kharkiv Oblast.

According to data from 1864, 280 people (130 men, 150 women) lived in the state farm that would go on to become Protopopivka, which was located in Kharkovsky Uyezd.
