= Viktor Liashko =

Ukrainian doctor

- Віктор Ляшко
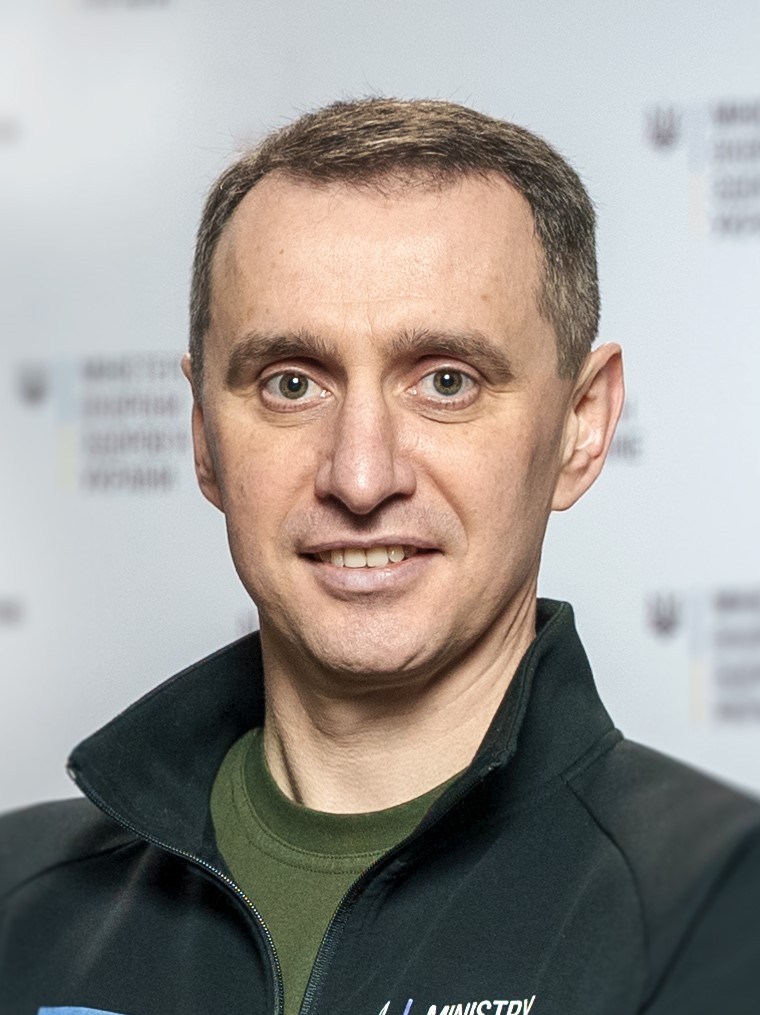
- Liashko in 2023

Minister of Healthcare
- Incumbent
- Assumed office 20 May 2021
- President: Volodymyr Zelenskyy
- Prime Minister: Denys Shmyhal; Yulia Svyrydenko; Serhii Koretskyi
- Preceded by: Maksym Stepanov

Personal details
- Born: 24 April 1980 (age 46) Osova, Rivne Oblast, Ukrainian SSR, Soviet Union (now Ukraine)
- Party: Independent

Viktor Kyrylovych Liashko (Ukrainian: Віктор Кирилович Ляшко; born 24 April 1980) is a Ukrainian politician and physician. He has been Minister of Healthcare of Ukraine since 20 May 2021. He was Chief State Sanitary Doctor of Ukraine from 2019 to 2021.

== Biography ==
Viktor Liashko was born on 24 April 1980 in the village of Osova in Rivne Oblast. In 2003 he graduated from the Bogomolets National Medical University.

From 2003 to 2010, he worked in the sanitary and epidemiological service of Kyiv Oblast. Later, he moved to the Ministry of Health, starting as a chief specialist and eventually becoming director of the State Sanitary Department of Ukraine.

From 2014 to February 2018, he served as a Chairman of the Non-governmental organization "Infection Control in Ukraine".

From 2015 to 2018, he acted as a public health consultant in the "HIV Service Reform in Action", a United States Agency for International Development (USAID) project. In addition, from 2014 to 2016, Viktor Liashko was one of the experts in the Reanimation Package of Reforms NGO.

In 2018, Viktor Liashko was a member of the public organization "Health Platform". The same year, Liashko returned to the civil service, taking the position of Deputy Director General of the Centre for Public Health.

On 24 December 2019, Liashko was appointed Deputy Minister of Healthcare of Ukraine, serving under Zoriana Skaletska. In this position, he participated in the evacuation of Ukrainian citizens from Wuhan, China at the beginning of COVID-19 pandemic.

From 11 March 2020, he served as a Chief Sanitary Doctor of Ukraine.

On 20 May 2021, he was appointed the Minister of Health of Ukraine by the Verkhovna Rada (the Ukrainian parliament). The appointment was supported by 262 people's deputies of Ukraine.

== Family ==
He is married. His wife is Iryna. He has a daughter, Daria.

== Awards ==
- Order of Merit, 3rd class (23 August 2022).
