= Edmund S. Muskie Graduate Fellowship Program =

Edmund S. Muskie Graduate Fellowship Program was a program of the Bureau of Educational and Cultural Affairs of the United States Department of State in 1992–2013.

The Edmund S. Muskie Graduate Fellowship Program provided opportunities for graduate students and professionals from Armenia, Azerbaijan, Belarus, Georgia, Kazakhstan, Kyrgyzstan, Moldova, Russia, Tajikistan, Turkmenistan, Ukraine and Uzbekistan for one-year non-degree, one-year degree or two-year degree study in the United States.

Eligible fields of study for the Muskie Program were business administration, economics, education, environmental management, international affairs, journalism and mass communication, law, library and information science, public administration, public health, and public policy.

The program was established by the United States Congress beginning from 1992 fiscal year (Pub. L. 102–138, Sec. 227) and was designated Edmund S. Muskie name by the Freedom Support Act of 1992 (Pub. L. 102–511, Sec. 801).

Due to fiscal constraints the Muskie program was discontinued in 2013 (the final cohort selected in 2012).

In the past, the program was administered by International Research & Exchanges Board and American Council of Teachers of Russian/American Council for Collaboration in Education and Language.

In 2015 Edmund S. Muskie Internship Program was launched as a professional exchange program. It provides summer internship placements, career training, and financial support to Eurasian scholars and graduate students studying in the United States. The program is administered by Cultural Vistas.

== Notable alumni ==
- Mikheil Saakashvili
- Aliona Babak
- Victoria Voytsitska
- Alexander Kvitashvili
- Andriy Pyvovarsky

== See also ==
- Edmund Muskie
- Edmund S. Muskie Internship Program
