= Minister of Healthcare (Ukraine) =

- Міністр охорони здоров'я
- Logo of Ministry

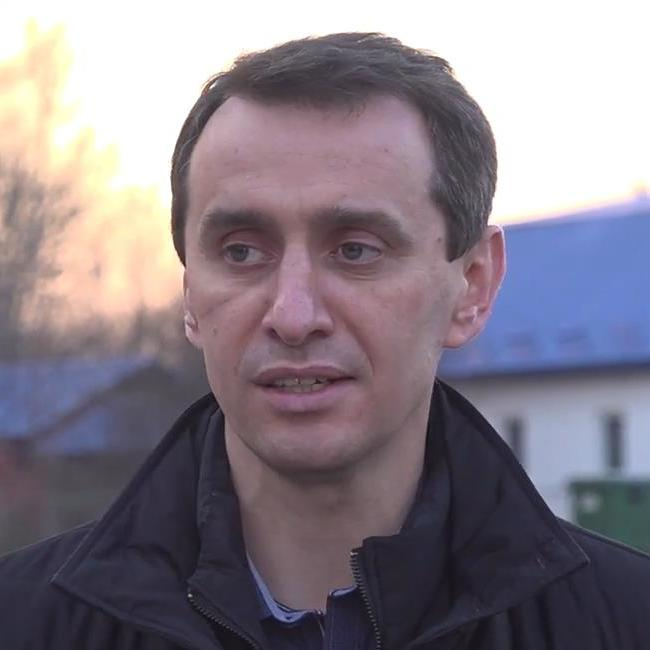
- Incumbent; Viktor Liashko since 20 May 2021
- Appointer: President of Ukraine
- Website: Ministry's Management

Minister of Healthcare of Ukraine (Ukrainian: Міністр охорони здоров'я (України)) is a member of the Cabinet of Ministers of Ukraine and a top government official heading the Ministry of Healthcare. The minister is appointed by the Prime Minister, while he or she is dismissed by the President.

== List of ministers ==
=== Ukrainian People's Republic and Ukrainian State ===
- 10/1917 – 01/1918 Borys Matyushenko
- 01/1918 – 04/1918 Yevmen Lukasevych
- 05/1918 – 12/1918 Vsevolod Lyubynsky
- 12/1918 – 02/1919 Borys Matyushenko
- 02/1919 – 04/1919 Ovksentiy Korchak-Chepurkivsky
- 04/1919 – 06/1919 M. Bilous
- 06/1919 – 11/1919 Dmytro Odryna
- 11/1919 – 1920 Oleksiy Bilousov
- 05/1920 – 03/1921 Stanisław Adam Stempowski

=== West Ukrainian People's Republic ===
- 11/1918 – 1919 Ivan Kurovets

=== Soviet Ukraine ===
- 01/1919 – 02/1919 Petro Tutyshkin
- 02/1919 – 04/1919 Oleksandr Vinokurov
  - 04/1919 – 04/1920 Mykola Kost (acting)
- 04/1920 – 1925 Moisei Hurevych
- 05/1925 – 1929 Dmytro Yefimov
- 1929 – 07/1937 Solomon Kantarovych
- 1937 – 01/1944 Ivan Ovsiyenko
- 01/1944 – 03/1944 A.Muzychenko
- 03/1944 – 02/1947 Ilarion Kononenko
- 03/1947 – 03/1952 Levko Medved
- 03/1952 – 04/1954 Platon Shupyk
- 07/1954 – 05/1956 Vasyl Bratus
- 06/1956 – 03/1969 Platon Shupyk
- 03/1969 – 04/1975 Vasyl Bratus
- 04/1975 – 11/1989 Anatoliy Romanenko
- 11/1989 – 06/1994 Yuriy Spizhenko

=== Ukrainian State (1941) ===
- 06/1941 – 07/1941 Marian Panchyshyn

=== Ukraine ===
Name of minister	Term of Office	
Name of minister	Start	End
Volodymyr Maltsev	July 1994	August 1994
Volodymyr Bobrov	August 1994	February 1995
Yevhen Korolenko	July 1995	July 1996
Andriy Serdyuk	September 1996	January 1999
Raisa Bohatyryova	January 1999	January 2000
Vitaliy Moskalenko	January 2000	November 2002
Andriy Pidayev	November 2002	February 2005
Mykola Polishchuk	February 2005	September 2005
Yuriy Polyachenko	October 2005	March 2007
Yuriy Haidayev	March 2007	December 2007
Vasyl Knyazevych	December 2007	March 2010
Zinoviy Mytnyk	March 2010	December 2010
Illya Yemets	December 2010	May 2011
Oleksandr Anishchenko	May 2011	February 2012
Raisa Bohatyryova	February 2012	23 February 2014
Oleh Musiy	27 February 2014	2 December 2014
Alexander Kvitashvili	2 December 2014	14 April 2016
Ulana Suprun (acting)	27 July 2016	29 August 2019
Zoriana Skaletska	29 August 2019	4 March 2020
Illya Yemets	4 March 2020	30 March 2020
Maksym Stepanov	30 March 2020	18 May 2021
Viktor Liashko	20 May 2021	Incumbent
