= Mykhailo Radutskyi =

Ukrainian politician

- Михайло Радуцький
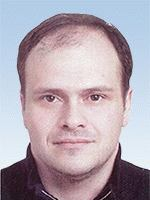

People's Deputy of Ukraine
- Incumbent
- Assumed office 29 August 2019

Personal details
- Born: 5 December 1968 (age 57) Kyiv, Ukraine
- Party: Servant of the People

Mykhailo Borysovych Radutskyi (Ukrainian: Михайло Борисович Радуцький; born 5 December 1968, Kyiv) is a Ukrainian entrepreneur, social activist, People's Deputy of Ukraine of the IVth convocation.

== Education ==
Studied at P.I. Gavros Kyiv Medical College, where qualified as an Emergency Medical Technician and at The National University of Ukraine on Physical Education and Sport on speciality "Olympic and professional sport", where he received a master's degree in Olympic and professional sport. In 1987 worked as an EMT on Kyiv ambulance station.

== Business career ==
In 1989–1993 held the position of deputy director of ‘Kyivconcert’. In 1993 started medical business. In 1994–2004 – commercial director, deputy director of LLC ‘Borys’, from 2004 – till 2019 of LLC ‘Borys’.

== Political activity ==
From 2014 – advisor to the head of Kyiv City State Administration Vitali Klitschko.

In the past – member of the Higher Medical Council of the Ministry of Healthcare of Ukraine. Candidate for people's deputies from the political party ‘Servant of the People’ in 2019 parliamentary elections, No. 18 on the list. Non-party.

On 30 July 2019 president Volodymyr Zelenskyy appointed Radutskyi his advisor (out of state).

- In 2019 was elected a People's Deputy of Ukraine of the IXth convocation in the 2019 Ukrainian parliamentary election as number 18 of the party list of the Servant of the People party. (Although he was not a member of any party.)
- Faction: Member of the Servant of the People parliamentary faction.
- On July 30, 2019, President Volodymyr Zelensky appointed Radutsky as his advisor (non-staff position).
- On August 29, 2019, he was elected as the chairman of the committee on national health, medical assistance, and medical insurance in the Verkhovna Rada of Ukraine, IX convocation [8]. In 2023, the CHESNO Movement recognized the work of the committee, led by Radutsky. as the most transparent.
- From 2019 to 2022, he voted in favor of legislative initiatives aimed at parliamentary reform.
- In 2020 he was appointed the Head of the temporary working group on healthcare system reform, by presidential decree.
- In 2021, as a Member of Parliament, he voted for legislative initiatives recognizing the importance of the events of the Revolution of Dignity in 2013-2014, ensuring social protection for affected participants, and assessing the actions of law enforcement agencies and state authorities.
- In 2023, Radutsky supported and advocated for government bill 7457 on the legalization of medical cannabis, along with the civil sector, including "Patients of Ukraine". In Ukraine, 60 plants are ready to produce medicines based on cannabis.
- On January 16, 2023, together with partners from France and Poland, Radutsky presented a mobile medical ambulance planned to be delivered to Ukraine.
- On October 19, 2023, he voted in favor of government bill 8371 in the first reading, allowing the prohibition of activities of religious organizations associated with the state-aggressor.
- On October 25, 2023, American and Ukrainian healthcare institutions signed two memorandums of cooperation, with Radutsky being one of the initiators of the signing.
- Post: Chairperson of the Verkhovna Rada (Ukraine's national parliament) Committee on Public Health, Medical Assistance and Medical Insurance.

Member of the Ukrainian part of interparliamentary assembly of the parliament of Georgia, parliament of the Republic of Moldova and the Verkhovna Rada of Ukraine. Deputy member of the Ukrainian part of the Parliamentary Committee of the Ukrainian part of the Parliamentary Association Committee. Head of a group for inter-parliamentary relations with the Kingdom of Thailand. Head of a group for inter-parliamentary relations with the Republic of Moldova. Member of a group for inter-parliamentary relations with the Italian Republic. Member of a group for inter-parliamentary relations with the Republic of Kazakhstan. Member of a group for inter-parliamentary relations with Armenia. Member of a group for inter-parliamentary relations with the French Republic. Member of a group for inter-parliamentary relations with the Republic of Croatia.
