= Yekhanurov government =

Government of Ukraine

Yekhanurov Government
- 11th Cabinet of Ukraine (since 1990)
- Lesser Coat of Arms of Ukraine.svg
- Date formed: September 22, 2005
- Date dissolved: January 10, 2006

People and organisations
- Head of state: Viktor Yushchenko
- Head of government: Yuriy Yekhanurov
- Deputy head of government: Stanislav Stashevsky
- No. of ministers: 23
- Member party: NUNS; Socialist Party of Ukraine
- Opposition party: Communist Party of Ukraine
- Opposition leader: Petro Symonenko

History
- Legislature term: 5 years
- Predecessor: First Tymoshenko government
- Successor: Second Yanukovych government

The first Yekhanurov Government was appointed after the first Tymoshenko Government was sacked amid resignations and corruption claims. Twelve days later the Ukrainian Parliament rejecting Ukrainian President Viktor Yushchenko choice of Yuri Yekhanurov for Prime Minister. Yekhanurov was three votes short of the 226 needed for approval with three out of 52 deputies from the Regions faction voting for Yekhanurov. On September 22, 2005 the Ukrainian parliament did approved Yekhanurov appointment with 289 votes. This time all the Parliamentarians of the Party of Regions faction of losing presidential candidate (in 2004) Viktor Yanukovych backed the appointment. This shortly after a "Memorandum Of Understanding Between The Authorities And The Opposition" was signed by Yekhanurov, Yushchenko and Yanukovych.

Yekhanurov government lost a vote of no confidence on January 10, 2006 but stayed in power until the parliamentary election two months later.

== Creation ==
=== Appointment of Yekhanurov (21-22 September 2005) ===
Faction	Number of deputies	For	Against	Abstained	Didn't vote	Absent
Communists	56	0	0	0	0	56
Party of Regions of Ukraine	50	50	0	0	0	0
People's Party	47	45	0	0	2	0
Our Ukraine	45	44	0	0	0	1
Yulia Tymoshenko Bloc	41	7	0	0	27	7
Unaffiliated	28	22	0	0	1	5
Socialist Party of Ukraine	25	25	0	0	0	0
Ukrainian People's Party	23	23	0	0	0	0
Forward, Ukraine!	20	20	0	0	0	0
Social Democratic Party of Ukraine (united)	20	0	0	0	15	5
One Ukraine	16	3	0	0	0	13
Party of Industrialists and Entrepreneurs of Ukraine	15	15	0	0	0	0
Reforms and Order Party	15	7	0	1	4	3
People's Movement of Ukraine	15	15	0	0	0	0
Faction of PDP and Labour Ukraine	13	13	0	0	0	0
All factions	429	289	0	1	49	90

== Composition ==
Party key	Our Ukraine
Party key	Socialist Party of Ukraine

Office	Name minister	Party	Appointment
Prime Minister	Yuriy Yekhanurov		8 September / 22 September (approved)
First Vice Prime Minister	Stanislav Stashevsky		28 September
First Vice Prime Minister — Industry	Anatoliy Kinakh (acting)		8 September – 27 September
Vice Prime Minister (on Humanitarian and Social issues)	Viacheslav Kyrylenko		28 September
Vice Prime Minister (on Agro-Industrial Complex)	Yuriy Melnyk		5 October
Vice Prime Minister (on Administrative-Territorial reform)	Roman Bezsmertnyi		8 September / 28 September – 27 November
Minister of Internal Affairs	Yuriy Lutsenko		8 September / 28 September
Minister of Foreign Affairs	Borys Tarasyuk		8 September / 28 September
Minister of Coal Industry	Viktor Topolov		8 September / 27 September
Minister of Culture and Tourism	Ihor Likhovy		5 October
Minister of Culture and Tourism	Oksana Bilozir (acting)		8 September – 28 September
Minister of Defense	Anatoliy Hrytsenko		8 September / 30 September
Minister of Economics	Arseniy Yatseniuk		28 September
Minister of Economics	Serhiy Teryokhin (acting)		8 September – 27 September
Minister of Education and Science	Stanislav Nikolaenko		8 September / 27 September
Minister of Fuel and Energy	Ivan Plachkov		8 September / 27 September
Minister of Labor and Social Policy	Ivan Sakhan		27 September
Minister of Labor and Social Policy	Vyacheslav Kyrylenko (acting)		8 September – 27 September
Minister of Construction, Architecture and Residential-Communal Farming	Pavlo Kachur		28 September
Minister of Health Care	Yuriy Polyachenko		14 October
Minister of Health Care	Mykola Polishchuk (acting)		8 September – 28 September
Minister of Agro-Industrial Complex issues	Oleksandr Baranivsky		8 September / 28 September
Minister of Industrial Policy	Volodymyr Shandra		8 September / 28 September
Minister of Environmental Protection issues	Pavlo Ihnatenko		8 September / 28 September
Minister of Transport and Communications	Viktor Bondar		28 September
Minister of Transport and Communications	Yevhen Chervonenko (acting)		8 September – 27 September
Minister of Emergency Situation issues	Viktor Baloha		27 September
Minister of Emergency Situation issues	David Zhvaniya (acting)		8 September – 27 September
Minister of Family, Youth and Sport	Yuriy Pavlenko		8 September / 28 September
Minister of Finance	Viktor Pynzenyk		8 September / 28 September
Minister of Justice	Serhiy Holovatyi		6 October
Minister of Justice	Roman Zvarych (acting)		8 September – 28 September
Minister of the Cabinet of Ministers	Bohdan Butsa		27 September
Minister of the Cabinet of Ministers	Petro Krupko (acting)		8 September – 27 September
