= Pustovoitenko government =

Government of Ukraine

The Pustovoitenko Government was created after the Ukrainian parliament had ousted the previous Cabinet of Pavlo Lazarenko (officially Lazarenko left the post of Prime Minister of Ukraine for health reasons).

On July 16, 1997, 226 deputies voted for the appointment of Valeriy Pustovoitenko, chairman of the People's Democratic Party, as Prime Minister of Ukraine. His new government was Ukraine's eighth since Ukraine gained its independence in August 1991.

On November 30, 1999 the Cabinet resign due to reelection of President Kuchma in 1999.

== Composition ==
Office	Name minister	Term	Party
Prime Minister	Valeriy Pustovoitenko	1997-1999	People's Democratic Party
First Vice Prime Minister	Anatoliy Holubchenko; Volodymyr Kuratchenko; Anatoliy Kinakh	1997-1998 1998-1999 1999	Independent Independent Independent
Vice Prime Minister (on issues of Economy)	Anatoliy Kinakh	1997-1999	Independent
Vice Prime Minister - Minister of Labor and Social Policy	Mykola Biloblotsky	1997-1998	
Vice Prime Minister	Volodymyr Semynozhenko	1997-1999	Independent
Vice Prime Minister	Valeriy Smoliy	1997-1999	Independent
Vice Prime Minister - Minister of Agro-Industrial Complex	Mykhailo Hladiy	1997-1999	Agrarian Party
Minister of Coal [Mining] Industry	Stanislav Yanko; Serhiy Tulub	1997-1998 1998-1999	Independent Independent
Minister of Rural Business and Provision	Yuriy Karasyk; Borys Supikhanov	1997-1998 1998-1999	
Minister of Economics	Viktor Suslov; Vasyl Rohovyi	1997-1998 1998-1999	Independent Independent
Minister of Finance	Ihor Mityukov	1997-1999	Independent
Minister of Defence	Oleksandr Kuzmuk	1997-1999	Armed Forces of Ukraine
Minister of Internal Affairs	Yuriy Kravchenko	1997-1999	Independent (Militsiya)
Minister of Industrial Policy	Vasyl Hureyev	1997-1999	
Minister of Healthcare	Andriy Serdyuk; Raisa Bogatyreva	1997-1999 1999	Independent Independent
Minister of Culture and Arts	Dmytro Ostapenko; Yuriy Bohutsky	1997-1999 1999	
Minister of Education	Mykhailo Zghurovskyi; Valentyn Zaychuk	1997-1999 1999	Independent Independent
Minister of Power Generation	Oleksiy Sheberstov; Ivan Plachkov	1997-1999 1999	
Minister of Cabinet of Ministers	Anatoliy Tolstoukhov	1997-1999	
Minister of Foreign Affairs	Hennadiy Udovenko; Borys Tarasyuk	1997-1998 1998-1999	People's Movement of Ukraine People's Movement of Ukraine
Minister of Emergencies and Population Protection from consequences of Chornobyl Catastrophe	Valeriy Kalchenko; Vasyl Durdynets	1997-1999 1999	Independent Independent (Internal Troops of Ukraine)
Minister on issues of Sciences and Technologies	Volodymyr Semynozhenko; Stanislav Dovhyi	1997-1998 1998-1999	Independent Independent
Minister of Foreign Economic Relations and Trade	Serhiy Osyka; Andrii Goncharuk	1997-1999 1999	
Minister of Natural Environment and Nuclear Safety	Yuriy Kostenko; Vasyl Shevchuk	1997-1998 1998-1999	People's Movement of Ukraine Independent
Minister of Transportation	Valeriy Cherep; Ivan Dankevych; Leonid Kostyuchenko	1997-1998 1998-1999 1999	
Minister of Justice	Suzanna Stanik	1997-1999	Independent
Minister on issues of Family and Youth	Valentyna Dovzhenko	1997-1999	
Minister of Information	Zinoviy Kulyk	1997-1999	
Minister of Labor and Social Policy	Ivan Sakhan	1998-1999	
