= First Tymoshenko government =

Government of Ukraine

First Tymoshenko Government
- 10th Cabinet of Ukraine (since 1990)

- Date formed: February 4, 2005
- Date dissolved: September 8, 2005

People and organisations
- Head of state: Viktor Yushchenko
- Head of government: Yulia Tymoshenko
- Deputy head of government: Anatoliy Kinakh
- No. of ministers: 22
- Member party: Yulia Tymoshenko Bloc; NUNS; Socialist Party of Ukraine; PPPU
- Opposition party: Communist Party of Ukraine
- Opposition leader: Petro Symonenko

History
- Predecessor: First Yanukovych government
- Successor: Yekhanurov government

The first Tymoshenko Government was appointed on February 4, 2005, by 373 Parliamentarians of the Verkhovna Rada (Ukrainian Parliament). It was supported (also by) opposition factions' Parliamentarians, including three Communists, 18 Social Democratic Party of Ukraine (united) members, 46 Regions faction members.

On September 8, 2005, Ukrainian President Viktor Yushchenko sacked the entire government after both Deputy Prime Minister Mykola Tomenko and presidential chief of staff Oleksandr Zinchenko spoke out that the government was "riddled with corruption".

== Creation ==
=== Government program "Towards the people" ===
Faction	Number of deputies	For	Against	Abstained	Didn't vote	Absent
Our Ukraine	101	99	0	0	2	0
Communists	59	0	0	0	37	22
Regions of Ukraine	54	43	0	0	4	7
Unaffiliated	33	27	0	0	1	5
People's Agrarian Party of Ukraine	33	32	0	0	0	1
Socialist Party of Ukraine	24	24	0	0	0	0
Social Democratic Party of Ukraine (united)	23	16	0	0	4	3
One Ukraine	22	20	0	0	0	2
Yulia Tymoshenko Bloc	18	17	0	0	1	0
Democratic Ukraine (group)	16	16	0	0	0	0
People's Will	15	14	0	0	0	1
Union (group)	15	14	0	0	1	0
Democratic Initiatives (group)	14	14	0	0	0	0
Center (group)	12	12	0	0	0	0
Faction of PDP and Republic (group)	10	9	0	0	0	1
All factions	449	357	0	0	50	42

== Composition ==
Party key	Our Ukraine
Party key	Socialist Party of Ukraine
Party key	Bloc Yulia Tymoshenko
Party key	Party of Industrialists and Entrepreneurs of Ukraine

Office	Name minister	Party
Prime Minister	Yulia Tymoshenko	
First Vice Prime Minister	Anatoliy Kinakh	
Vice Prime Minister on European Accession	Oleh Rybachuk	
Vice Prime Minister on Humanitarian and Social Issues	Mykola Tomenko	
Vice Prime Minister on Administrative Reform	Roman Bezsmertny	
Minister of Education and Science	Stanislav Nikolaenko	
Minister of Transport and Communications	Yevhen Chervonenko	
Minister of Culture and Tourism	Oksana Bilozir	
Minister of Economics	Serhiy Teryokhin	
Minister of Labor and Social Policy	Viacheslav Kyrylenko	
Minister of Defense	Anatoliy Hrytsenko	
Minister of Health Safety	Mykola Polischuk	
Minister of Industrial Policy	Volodymyr Shandra	
Minister of Internal Affairs	Yuriy Lutsenko	
Minister of Agrarian Policy	Oleksandr Baranivsky	
Minister of Justice	Roman Zvarych	
Minister of Foreign Affairs	Borys Tarasyuk	
Minister of Family, Youth and Sport	Yuriy Pavlenko	
Minister of Finance	Viktor Pynzenyk	
Minister of Fuel and Energy	Ivan Plachkov	
Minister of Environmental Protection	Pavlo Ihnatenko	
Minister of Emergencies	David Zhvania	

== Key economic achievements of Tymoshenko’s government ==
Increased salaries, pensions, scholarships;

Fulfilled one of the paragraphs of social program from Yushchenko's election agenda on support for new families: in 2005 a social aid for a newborn child was increased 12 times;

“Contraband stop” campaign was launched. The campaign was accompanied by eradication of shadow schemes in business;

Call for nationalization and re-privatization of more than 3000 enterprises. Eventually the government nationalized and then re-privatized country's biggest metallurgical plant “Kryvorizhstal”. In October 2005 it was sold for $4 billion to a new owner, which was an impressive amount compared to $8.5 billion received by the government from privatization between 1991 and 2004;

On June 16, 2005, president Viktor Yushchenko, speaker of the Verkhovna Rada Volodymyr Lytvyn and Yulia Tymoshenko signed a memorandum on guarantees of ownership rights and ensuring lawfulness for their implementation. According to Yushchenko, “Ukrainian government brought murky privatization practice to the end”;

=== Reaction to crises on internal market ===
In April–May 2005 Ukraine faced so called “meat, sugar and petrol crises” when prices for the abovementioned products went up by 30-50% over a couple of weeks. These crises allegedly resulted from a cartel conspiracy and it took Tymoshenko's government about 1.5 months to get the prices down to the initial level with the help of “goods intervention” mechanism;

The meat crisis was caused by increased demand for meat as a result of increased salaries. Tymoshenko's government lifted duties on imported meat, which dropped the speculative prices Tymoshenko's political opponents (Yushchenko and Yanukovych) kept criticizing her for importing “low quality meat”. At that time Tymoshenko's government made a decision to increase production of poultry, which eventually made Ukraine a poultry exporter.

The sugar and petrol crises were caused by a “cartel conspiracy” which increased prices for the abovementioned goods by 30-50%. Tymoshenko's government organized importation of cane sugar and dropped duties on imported oil products. In a couple of months the prices stabilized. In 2006 the Anti-Monopoly Committee, who investigated the “sugar crisis” issued a conclusion which said that it was a cartel monopoly with a participation of Petro Poroshenko, then-head of the National Council of Security and Defense.

In May 2005, at the height of the petrol crisis, Viktor Yushchenko publicly, sharply criticized Tymoshenko for “pressure on oil traders”.
