= Valeriy Pustovoitenko =

Prime Minister of Ukraine from 1997 to 1999

- Валерій Пустовойтенко
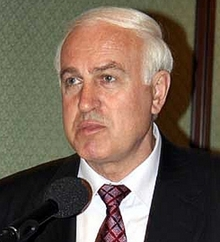
- Pustovoitenko in 2015

6th Prime Minister of Ukraine
- In office 16 July 1997 – 22 December 1999
- President: Leonid Kuchma
- Preceded by: Pavlo Lazarenko
- Succeeded by: Viktor Yushchenko

Mayor of Dnipropetrovsk
- In office 1989 – April 1993
- Preceded by: Volodymyr Yatsuba
- Succeeded by: Viktor Merkushov

People's Deputy of Ukraine
- In office 31 March 2002 – 25 May 2006
- Constituency: For United Ukraine!, No. 6
- In office 15 May 1990 – 10 May 1994
- Preceded by: Office established
- Succeeded by: Serhii Mykhailenko
- Constituency: Dnipropetrovsk Oblast, October District

Minister of Transportation
- In office 9 June 2001 – 30 April 2002
- President: Leonid Kuchma
- Prime Minister: Anatoliy Kinakh
- Preceded by: Leonid Kostyuchenko
- Succeeded by: Heorhiy Kirpa

Minister of the Cabinet of Ministers
- In office July 1994 – July 1997
- President: Leonid Kravchuk; Leonid Kuchma
- Prime Minister: Vitaliy Masol; Yevhen Marchuk; Pavlo Lazarenko
- Preceded by: Ivan Dotsenko
- Succeeded by: Anatoliy Tolstoukhov
- In office April 1993 – September 1993
- President: Leonid Kravchuk
- Prime Minister: Leonid Kuchma
- Preceded by: Anatoliy Lobov
- Succeeded by: Ivan Dotsenko

Personal details
- Born: 23 February 1947 (age 79) Adamivka, Ukrainian SSR, Soviet Union
- Party: People's Democratic Party
- Other political affiliations: Labour Ukraine; Party of Industrialists and Entrepreneurs of Ukraine; Communist Party of the Soviet Union (before 1991)
- Education: Dnipropetrovsk Civil Engineering Institute

Military service
- Allegiance: Soviet Union
- Branch/service: Soviet Army
- Years of service: 1966–1968

Valeriy Pavlovych Pustovoitenko (Ukrainian: Валерій Павлович Пустовойтенко, Ukrainian pronunciation: [ʋɐˈlɛrʲii̯ ˈpau̯lowɪt͡ʃ pʊstoˈwɔi̯tenko]; born 23 February 1947) is a Ukrainian politician who served as the 6th Prime Minister of Ukraine from 16 July 1997 to 22 December 1999. He was leader to the People's Democratic Party of Ukraine.

== Early life and career ==
Valeriy Pavlovych Pustovoitenko was born 23 February 1947 in the village of Adamivka, in Berezanka Raion (now part of the rural settlement of Berezanka). He worked in Odesa from 1961 to 1966, first as a teacher and later as a factory worker before serving in the Soviet Army for two years from 1966 to 1968. After leaving the army, he worked as a mechanic at Odesa Polytechnic Institute from 1969 to 1971 before studying at Dnipropetrovsk Civil Engineering Institute (now Prydniprovska State Academy of Civil Engineering and Architecture) from 1971 to 1975, graduating with a specialisation in mechanical engineering. He completed his Candidate of Sciences thesis in 1996 and his Doctor of Sciences thesis in 2002.

Pustovoitenko began working at Dniprobudmekhanizatsiia, a company in Dnipropetrovsk (present-day Dnipro) in 1975. Within nine years, he had become the company's director. He later became a member of the Dnipropetrovsk Mafia. From October 1993 to July 1994 he was deputy chairman of Ekspobank, a credit union.

== Political career ==
Pustovoitenko became a member of the Communist Party of the Soviet Union in 1979. at the time of the dissolution of the Soviet Union, he was a member of the Revision Committee of the Communist Party of Ukraine.

Pustovoitenko entered politics in 1986, becoming head of the executive committee of Babushkinskyi District, Dnipropetrovsk and a deputy of the Dnipropetrovsk Oblast Council. The next year, he was appointed as deputy chairman of the Dnipropetrovsk urban executive committee, with a portfolio of communal housing affairs. He was mayor of Dnipropetrovsk from 1989 to April 1993. During this time, he publicly opposed efforts to raise the national flag of Ukraine in the city, favouring the maintenance of the flag of the Soviet Union. According to Ivan Shulyk, who raised the flag in Dnipropetrovsk, said that Pustovoitenko had encouraged him to raise the flag.

Pustovoitenko was elected to the Supreme Soviet of the Ukrainian Soviet Socialist Republic in the 1990 Ukrainian Supreme Soviet election, representing Dnipropetrovsk's October District. He was a member of the Commission on Construction, Architecture and Communal Housing. Pustovoitenko sought re-election in the district during the 1994 Ukrainian parliamentary election, but he was defeated by Serhii Mykhailenko, placing second with 46.13% of the vote. From April to September 1993 Pustovoitenko was Minister of the Cabinet of Ministers. He later served in the position from July 1994 to July 1997.

During the 1994 Ukrainian presidential election, Pustovoitenko was one of the managers of Leonid Kuchma's campaign staff, alongside Volodymyr Horbulin. Kuchma was ultimately successfully elected, defeating incumbent President Leonid Kravchuk.

=== Prime Minister of Ukraine ===
Pustovoitenko was appointed as Prime Minister of Ukraine by Kuchma in 1997, being confirmed by the Verkhovna Rada by a vote of 226 to 91 on 16 July. Coming after a public fallout between Kuchma and Prime Minister Pavlo Lazarenko that led to the latter's dismissal, Pustovoitenko's appointment was viewed as a move towards stability, according to academic Adrian Karatnycky. The Pustovoitenko government, including a heterogenous mixture of former nomenklatura members, young technocrats and private-sector businessmen, was tasked with a process of intense economic reforms, designed to improve Kuchma's popularity before the 1999 presidential election. Kuchma addressed the Verkhovna Rada and the leadership of Ukraine's regions on 13 July 1997, declaring his future tasks to be the formation of a "Supreme Economic Council", a parliamentary working group on economic reforms between the Rada, the cabinet and the presidency, the postponement of the 1998 parliamentary and local elections, and a memorandum of understanding between Kuchma and the Rada. Pustovoitenko, according to academic Volodymyr Zviglyanich, was to play a critical role in accomplishing all of these.

While in office, Pustovoitenko improved collections on income taxes, value-added taxes and tariffs, pursued budgetary discipline and increased exports to other post-Soviet countries. In August 1998, he assembled a group of businessmen in the Palace "Ukraine" in Kyiv and threatened to lock them in the building until they paid their taxes. Those who were uncooperative were conscripted into the military and had their cars seized by the government. Pustovoitenko also signed an October 1999 agreement with Russian Prime Minister Vladimir Putin that transferred 600 Ukrainian-made cruise missiles and 11 bomber planes to the Russian Armed Forces in return for decreases in natural gas prices. These weapons were later used by Russia during their invasion of Ukraine.

Following Kuchma's victory in the 1999 election, the International Monetary Fund and the World Bank expressed dissatisfaction with what they perceived to be inconsistent economic policies with Ukraine, and United States Vice President Al Gore told Kuchma that the U.S. wished for him to be replaced by National Bank of Ukraine head Viktor Yushchenko as Prime Minister. Kuchma initially considered reappointing Pustovoitenko, but ultimately determined to replace him with Yushchenko in December 1999 in order to unlock a resumption of IMF loans for Ukraine's economy.

=== People's Democratic Party ===
During the 1998 Ukrainian parliamentary election, Pustovoitenko was leader of one of two factions of the People's Democratic Party (Ukrainian: Народно-демократична партія, romanized: Narodno-demkoratychna partiia, abbreviated NDP). Pustovoitenko's wing, representing the nomenklatura and newly-established business interests, clashed with Anatoliy Matviyenko's pro-democratic wing. Pustovoitenko led efforts to transform the NDP into a party of power including all of Ukraine's governing elite that would support Kuchma's programme.

Pustovoitenko was elected as the first candidate on the NDP's proportional list in the 1998; he resigned from his seat in the Verkhovna Rada to continue serving as Prime Minister. The results of the election were humiliating for the NDP, with only 5% of the vote and 29 seats. In the aftermath of the election, however, as a result of several agreements between deputies, the NDP's number grew to a peak of 93 deputies. This coalition ultimately proved fragile, and by 1999 it had effectively dissolved into several different factions. Pustovoitenko replaced Matviyenko as leader of the rump NDP that year. Between 9 June 2001 and 30 April 2002 he was Minister of Transportation.

During the 2002 Ukrainian parliamentary election, Pustovoitenko was re-elected to the Verkhovna Rada, this time as the sixth candidate on the proportional representative list of the For United Ukraine! party. Following For United Ukraine's collapse, he led the People's Democratic Party in the Rada, additionally being co-leader of Labour Ukraine and the Party of Industrialists and Entrepreneurs of Ukraine. He was chair of the Commission on Construction, Transport, Communal Housing and Infrastructure.

The NDP provided ministers to both the Yushchenko government and the first Yanukovych government. Pustovoitenko reluctantly supported Viktor Yanukovych's candidacy in the 2004 presidential election after coming under pressure from Kuchma, saying at the NDP's July 2004 congress, "We have no other choice but to go along with the authorities". Pustovoitenko's decision caused a split in the party, with most local branches favouring Yushchenko's candidacy.

Sporting positions
| Preceded by Viktor Bannikov | President of the Football Federation of Ukraine; 1996–2000 | Succeeded by Hryhoriy Surkis |
Political offices
| Preceded by Vasyl Durdynets | Prime Minister of Ukraine; 1997–1999 | Succeeded by Viktor Yushchenko |
