= 2015 Ivano-Frankivsk Oblast local election =

Local election in Ukraine

All 84 seats to the Ivano-Frankivsk Oblast Council
	Majority party	Minority party	Third party
Party	Petro Poroshenko Bloc	Batkivshchyna	Svoboda
Seats won	23	17	16
Percentage	27.38%	20.24%	19.05%
	Fourth party	Fifth party	Sixth party
Party	UKROP	Self Reliance	Volia
Seats won	12	8	7
Percentage	14.29%	9.52%	8.33%
Head of Council before election
Vasyl Skrypnychuk
Freedom
Elected Head of Council
Oleksandr Sych
Freedom

Ivano-Frankivsk Oblast local election, 2015 was a local election in Ivano-Frankivsk Oblast.

== Results ==
Seats and percentage
Petro Poroshenko Bloc (23)	27.38%
Fatherland (17)	20.24%
Freedom (16)	19.05%
UKROP (12)	14.29%
Self Reliance (8)	9.52%
Liberty (7)	8.33%
