= Dmytro Tabachnyk =

Ukrainian historian and politician

- Дмитро Табачник (Ukrainian); Дмитрий Табачник (Russian)
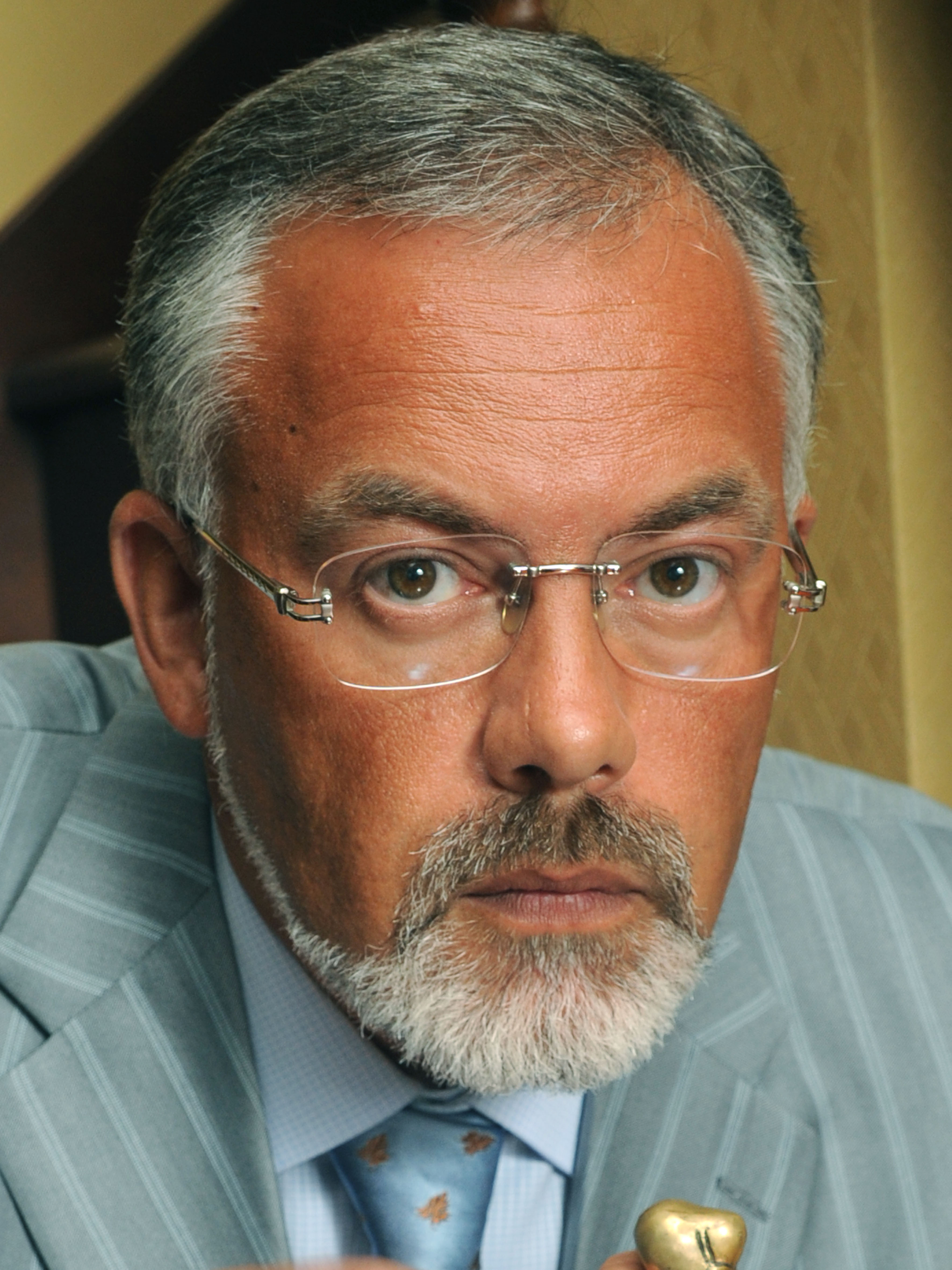
- Tabachnyk in 2008

Minister of Education
- In office 11 March 2010 – 23 February 2014
- Prime Minister: Mykola Azarov
- Preceded by: Ivan Vakarchuk
- Succeeded by: Serhiy Kvit

Deputy Prime Minister of Ukraine on Humanitarian Policy
- In office 4 August 2006 – 18 December 2007
- Prime Minister: Viktor Yanukovych
- Preceded by: Vyacheslav Kyrylenko
- Succeeded by: Ivan Vasyunyk

Deputy Prime Minister of Ukraine on Humanitarian Policy
- In office 2 September 2003 – 3 February 2005
- Prime Minister: Viktor Yanukovych
- Preceded by: Volodymyr Semynozhenko
- Succeeded by: Mykola Tomenko

Head of the Office of the President of Ukraine
- In office July 1994 – 20 December 1996
- President: Leonid Kuchma
- Preceded by: Mykola Khomenko
- Succeeded by: Yevhen Kushnaryov

Personal details
- Born: 26 November 1963 (age 62) Kiev, Ukrainian SSR, Soviet Union
- Party: United Russia
- Other political affiliations: Party of Regions
- Spouse: Tatiana Nazarova (1960)

Dmytro Volodymyrovych Tabachnyk (Ukrainian: Дмитро Володимирович Табачник, Russian: Дмитрий Владимирович Табачник, romanized: Dmitry Vladimirovich Tabachnik; born 26 November 1963) is a Russian and former Ukrainian politician who served as the minister of education and science of Ukraine from 2010 to 2014. Tabachnyk is among former Ukrainian officials who have had their assets frozen by EU and is wanted in Ukraine for embezzlement and abuse of office. As a fugitive, he was believed to be in Israel and Crimea.

Amidst the Russian invasion of Ukraine Tabachnyk reappeared in public as a collaborator with Russia in Russian occupied Zaporizhzhia Oblast.

== Career ==
In 1986 Tabachnyk graduated from the faculty of History of Kyiv University.

Initially he worked in the State Archives as a curator of materials about the Kyiv chapter of the Komsomol.

In 1990 he became a delegate to the Kyiv City Council. From 1991 to 1992 he was a consultant in the Secretariat of the Verkhovna Rada. From 1993 he was in charge of Information and Press for the Cabinet of Ministers.

In 1994 he became the head of the committee to elect Leonid Kuchma as president of Ukraine where he was accused of falsification of sociological data.

Tabachnyk was a Member of Parliament from March 1998 through March 2003 for Labour Ukraine.

In November 2002 through February 2005, he served as vice premier in the First Yanukovych Government. April 2006 through December 2007, Tabachnyk was a vice premier in the Second Yanukovych Government. He became a Party of Regions MP again following the 2007 Ukrainian parliamentary election.

In 1996 he was accused of influencing peddling the Supreme Court regarding the death penalty given to a terrorist action perpetrated by a Russian national in Simferopol.

He was forced to resign from Parliament because he illegally procured for himself the military title of colonel.

From 1997 to 1998 he was an advisor to President Kuchma.

In 2002–2005 he became vice-premier minister of Ukraine under Victor Yanukovych. During this period he was involved with the scandal of donating letters by Ukrainian historian Mykhailo Hrushevsky to the Ukrainian archive in Kyiv which had previously been stolen from the Lviv archives.

In March 2006, he was elected to the Supreme Council of Crimea as a deputy of the For Yanukovych! Bloc.

=== Minister of Education and Science of Ukraine ===
On 11 March 2010, the day the Azarov Government and thus Tabachnyk was installed, the Lviv branch of Forward, Ukraine! started to collect signatures in support of the dismissal of Education and Science Minister Dmytro Tabachnyk. On 17 March 2010, the Administration of the Ukrainian Catholic University appealed to the education community in Ukraine to come out publicly about the situation in the education field after the appointment of Tabachnyk as education and science minister. According to them "Tabachnyk has been openly and publicly humiliating the Ukrainian intelligentsia, as well as Ukrainian language and Ukrainian culture, kindling hostility among the various regions of Ukraine, vindicating the human-hating Stalinist regime, which has been condemned alongside fascism for crimes against humanity by the Parliamentary Assembly of the Organization of Security and Cooperation in Europe; he doubts the sacrifices borne by the Ukrainian people in the times of the Soviet totalitarianism". 5,000 people held a rally in Lviv in support of Tabachnyk's dismissal on 17 March 2010. Vyacheslav Kyrylenko, leader of For Ukraine!, stated during the rally that his party would work tirelessly to oust Tabachnyk from his post, and introduced a resolution asking the Ukrainian parliament to dismiss Tabachnyk. The initiative was supported by other opposition groups, including Bloc Yulia Tymoshenko.

Faced with these protests Tabachnyk stated on 17 March 2010 he would keep his ideas about the country's history to himself. Tabachnyk also promised not to backpedal on the "progressive educational reforms" (the Bologna education system and independent testing, which claims to "objectively determine students’ knowledge and is a critical component in ensuring they can enter university without paying bribes") that have already been introduced. President Victor Yanukovych had campaigned on the promise to abolish testing in 2009. As late as 15 March 2010 his deputy, Hanna Herman, maintained they would be eliminated. Herman also stated Yanukovych had privately met with Tabachnyk on 15 March and put him on notice. “He had to promise the president to hide under lock and key his personal views and anti-Ukrainian statements and strictly follow the education policy approved by the parliament and the Cabinet of Ministers. If he breaches that agreement, the president will take an adequate decision”.

By 17 March 2010 four of western Ukraine’s regional councils had passed resolutions calling for the minister’s dismissal. A host of civic and student organizations from all over the country (including Kherson in southern Ukraine and Donetsk in eastern Ukraine), authors and former Soviet dissidents also signed petitions calling for his removal.

Tabachnyk dismissed these campaigns against him as “witch hunts”, stating “If they don’t like my articles, they should turn to the editors who published them.”

At same moment rectors of some leading Ukrainian colleges and universities, intellectual and cultural leaders of Ukraine applied to the President and Prime Minister of Ukraine, the chairman of the Supreme Rada, in support of Dmitry Tabachnyk. They named opened propaganda campaign against Tabachnyk in this position as “gamble and speculations of certain political forces”. Authors of the said statement recalled a positive results of Tabachnyk's work in a position of the vice-premier in Yanukovych Government in the past.

On 20 March 2010, the Ukrainian national television channel Inter made live sociological interrogation at prime time, asking respondents to answer a question if they are supporting Tabachnyk in position of Science and education minister or against him. The results were that 67% supported him in this position and 33% said that he had to resign. It being said that about 30,000 respondents voted.

A website was created to support Tabachnyk in position of Science and education minister. It contains an open letter to the President and Prime Minister of Ukraine "from representatives of intellectuals, mass media and the non-governmental organisations of Ukraine in support of Dmitry Tabachnyk on a post of the Minister of Education and Science of Ukraine".

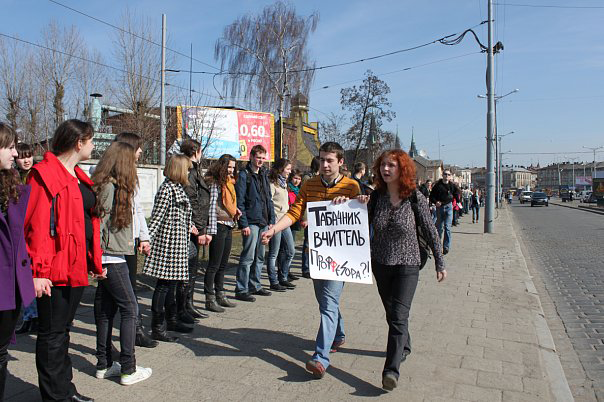
Over 5,000 students in Lviv formed a human chain on 23 March 2010, to protest the appointment of Tabachnyk. Students passed hand-to-hand a large black book in which they "graded" the new minister. The book is expected to travel the country to various universities throughout and then will then be presented to Tabachnyk early April 2010. Smaller anti-Tabachnyk rallies have also taken place in central and southern Ukraine, and even in Donetsk, stronghold of his Party of Regions.

Former President Viktor Yushchenko warned his successor, Viktor Yanukovych, against appointing Tabachnyk as minister, stating "This is a minister who can only bring division in higher education and in Ukrainian education".

On 19 March 2010 the Supreme Council of the Autonomous Republic of Crimea applied to President Viktor Yanukovych, the Verkhovna Rada (Ukrainian parliament), and the Cabinet of Ministers to keep Tabachnyk in position of Science and Education Minister of Ukraine. While by 25 March 2010 the Volyn Oblast council (the provincial parliament), Lviv Oblast council, Ternopil Oblast Council, Ivano-Frankivsk Oblast council, Rivne Oblast Council, as well as Sumy City Council, Lutsk City Council and Lviv City Council had applied to these same institutions with the exact opposite demand.

On 27 March 2010 over 2,000 students supporting Tabachnyk held a meeting in Odesa. The participants proclaimed they wanted to show their support to new minister and reforms in his Ministry.

On 30 March a total of 202 lawmakers with 226 needed voted in favour of a bill asking for Tabachnyk's dismissal. A new bill was registered the same day; "We'll do that until this man leaves Ukrainian education" Our Ukraine-People's Self-Defense faction member Viacheslav Kyrylenko stated.

On 13 May 2010 Tabachnyk announced that Ukraine and Russia intended to develop a common textbook for history teachers. In March 2010 Tabachnyk had stated that Ukrainian history textbooks contained "simply false" information and announced his intention to rewrite them. He also promised to personally re-read high school books on history, literature and humanitarian subjects.

In 2011 Tabachnyk was criticized for approving new schoolbooks on the history of Ukraine, which included a biography of then president Yanukovych, but failed to mention some aspects of Ukrainian history such as certain activities of the OUN or the proclamation of Carpatho-Ukraine, and replaced the term "Second World War" with "Great Patriotic War".

Tabachnyk was placed at number 11 on the electoral list of Party of Regions during the 2012 Ukrainian parliamentary election. He was re-elected into parliament.

In 2013 the Ukrainian Ministry of Education removed leading figures in Ukraine after the Russian Revolution, Ukrainian nationalists like Stepan Bandera and Roman Shukhevych and a number of Soviet dissidents from the list of "minimum necessary knowledge of graduates" and replaced them with Soviet military leaders and Communist Party of the Soviet Union party activists.

On 23 February 2014, just after the Revolution of Dignity, the Verkhovna Rada dismissed Foreign Minister Leonid Kozhara and Education Minister Tabachnyk.

=== Russian invasion of Ukraine ===
In November 2022, Tabachnyk was charged with treason for cooperating with the FSB and the Russian occupation administrations of Kherson and Zaporizhzhia Oblasts during the Russian invasion of Ukraine. His property, including five plots and half of an apartment in Kyiv, were seized by the Security Service of Ukraine (SBU) in January 2023.

On 4 February 2023, President Volodymyr Zelenskyy revoked Tabachnyk's Ukrainian citizenship.

On 27 April 2023 information appeared on the website of the Russian political party United Russia that claimed that Tabachnyk was a member of this party and that he would be running for this party in the 2023 Russian regional elections that will also take place in the four occupied Ukrainian oblasts that were illegally annexed on 30 September 2022. Tabachnyk was stated to run for deputy in Russian occupied Zaporizhzhia Oblast and was listed as being a "adviser to the head of the Zaporizhzhia Oblast Central Committee."

In May 2023, the SBU announced that after the start of the Russian invasion of Ukraine, Tabachnyk "conducted subversive activities against Ukraine with a representative of the Russian intelligence service". According to SBU, he took an "active part in organizing pseudo-referendums in the occupied regions of Kherson and Zaporizhzhia". They added that he carried out Russia's tasks of "reformatting" the educational and medical industries in the occupied territories to meet the needs of the aggressor country".

== View of Ukraine's history ==
Tabachnyk was loathed by opposition politicians for his view of Ukraine's history which includes the thesis that western Ukrainians are not really Ukrainian. In a 2009 article for the Russian newspaper Izvestia, Tabachnyk wrote: “Halychany (western Ukrainians) practically don’t have anything in common with the people of Great Ukraine, not in mentality, not in religion, not in linguistics, not in the political arena” “We have different enemies and different allies. Furthermore, our allies and even brothers are their enemies, and their ‘heroes’ (Stepan Bandera, Roman Shukhevych) for us are killers, traitors and abettors of Hitler’s executioners.”

Tabachnyk also denies that the Holodomor was a genocide, considering it an invention of foreign historians for political motives.

== Political views ==
Tabachnyk has advocated expanding the rights of Russian-language speakers and is loathed by some politicians and branded as being anti-Ukrainian.

According to Anders Åslund (in October 2012) Tabachnyk "could hardly care less about the real problems in Ukrainian education" but instead "His endeavor to sovietize Ukrainian historiography and promote russification attracts most attention". Åslund further argued that Tabachnyk's "greatest 'reform' had been to reduce ordinary school from the European standard of [year] 12 to [year] 11, seemingly inspired by the destruction instigated by the late Turkmenbashi".

== Personal life ==
Tabachnyk is married to Tatiana Nazarova, an actress of the Lesya Ukrainka National Academic Theater of Russian Drama. Tabachnyk was born into a family of the technical intelligentsia. His father, Volodymyr Ihorovych Tabachnyk, was a Jew, was born in 1940 and was an aircraft manufacturing engineer (i.e. aerospace engineer). His mother, Alla Viktorivna Glyebova, was Russian, and was a structural engineer. She was born in 1938.

== Honours ==
- Табачник, Дмитрий Владимирович
- Order of Prince Yaroslav the Wise
- Order of Bohdan Khmelnytsky 3rd class
- Grand Cross of the Order of Merit of the Italian Republic (28 October 1996).
- Grand Officer of Order of Merit (Portugal) (16 April 1998)
- Order of Merit of the Republic of Poland
- Order of St. Sava
- Medal "For Courage in a Fire" (USSR)

Political offices
Preceded by Mykola Khomenko	Head of the Presidential Administration; 1994–1996	Succeeded by Yevhen Kushnariov
