= For United Ukraine! =

For United Ukraine! За Єдину Україну!
- Leader: Volodymyr Lytvyn
- Founded: 15 December 2001
- Dissolved: June 2002
- Headquarters: Kyiv
- Ideology: Pro-Kuchma; Authoritarianism; Regionalism; Russophilia; Parliamentarism
- Political position: Centre
- Colours: Blue and Yellow (Ukrainian national colors)

Website
- www.zaedu.org.ua

For United Ukraine! (Ukrainian: «За Єдину Україну!», romanized: Za Yedynu Ukrayinu!) was a political alliance and an electoral bloc in Ukraine founded in December 2001 to participate in the parliamentary election held on 31 March 2002.

== History ==
In the parliamentary election, the party was supportive of authoritarian, incumbent President Leonid Kuchma, and opposed to the pro-democratic Our Ukraine–People's Self-Defense Bloc. It was described by Radio Free Europe/Radio Liberty as a "party of power", including oligarchs, bureaucrats, and pro-Kuchma politicians, as an attempt to further increase Kuchma's power through constitutional and extra-constitutional means. At the election, the alliance won 11.77% of the popular vote and a total of 102 out of 450 seats, placing it in third behind Our Ukraine and the Communist Party of Ukraine. Final poll results had predicted 7-8% of the total votes. The alliance received many of its votes from Donetsk Oblast.

The alliance consisted of the 5 following members:

- Party of Regions (Ukrainian: Партія регіонів, romanized: Partiia rehioniv), led by Volodymyr Semynozhenko.
- Agrarian Party of Ukraine (Ukrainian: Аграрна партія України, romanized: Ahrarna partiia Ukrayiny), led by Governor of Lviv Oblast Mykhailo Hladiy.
- Party of Industrialists and Entrepreneurs of Ukraine (Ukrainian: Партія промисловців i підприємців України, romanized: Partiya promyslovtsiv i pidpryiemtsiv Ukrayiny, PPPU), led by Anatoliy Kinakh.
- People's Democratic Party (Ukrainian: Народно-демократична партія, romanized: Narodno-demokratychna partiia), led by former Prime Minister Valeriy Pustovoitenko.
- Labour Ukraine (Ukrainian: Трудова Україна, romanized: Trudova Ukrayina), led by Serhiy Tyhypko.

Top-10 party list: Volodymyr Lytvyn (non-partisan), Anatoliy Kinakh (Party of Industrialists and Entrepreneurs of Ukraine), Kateryna Vashchuk (Agrarian Party of Ukraine), Volodymyr Boyko (Party of Regions), Viktor Skopenko (Party of Industrialists and Entrepreneurs of Ukraine), Valeriy Pustovoitenko (People's Democratic Party), Serhiy Tihipko (Labour Ukraine), Volodymyr Semynozhenko (Party of Regions), Mykhailo Hladiy (Agrarian Party of Ukraine), Heorhiy Kirpa (non-partisan).

Party	PR			Constituency	Total seats	+/–
Party	Votes	%	Seats	Seats	Total seats	+/–
For United Ukraine (bloc)	3,051,056	12.2	35	66	101	New
Party of Regions			6	25	31	+29
Agrarian Party of Ukraine			7	15	22	+20
Party of Industrialists and Entrepreneurs of Ukraine			5	1	6	New
People's Democratic Party			7	10	17	-11
Labour Ukraine (Trudova Ukrayina)			2	2	4	New
unaffiliated			8	13	21	-

== Since the election ==
The electoral bloc disintegrated in June 2002, following the 2002 Ukrainian parliamentary election.

== See also ==
- United Russia, a pro-Putin political project created in 2001
- Our Ukraine–People's Self-Defense Bloc, main opponent
