= Tymoshenko Government =

Tymoshenko Government may refer to these cabinets of Ukraine headed by Yulia Tymoshenko as Prime Minister:

- First Tymoshenko Government, February 2005 to September 2005
- Second Tymoshenko Government, December 2007 to March 2010
