= Ukrainian Union of Industrialists and Entrepreneurs =

Trade association in Ukraine

- Український союз промисловців і підприємців
- Founded: 15 February 1992; 34 years ago
- Founder: Vasyl Yevtukhov
- Type: Trade association
- Chairman: Anatoliy Kinakh
- Website: uspp.ua

The Ukrainian Union of Industrialists and Entrepreneurs (Ukrainian: Український союз промисловців і підприємців, romanized: Ukrainskyi soiuz promyslovtsiv i pidpryiemtsiv, abbreviated USPP), formally known as the Ukrainian League of Industrialists and Entrepreneurs (ULIE), is a trade association in Ukraine representing the interests of industrial businesses.

The USPP was founded on 15 February 1992, with Vasyl Yevtukhov serving as the group's inaugural president. From 1993, the group was led by Leonid Kuchma, who utilised it as a means to support himself in the 1994 parliamentary and presidential elections. The USPP, along with the New Ukraine party of Volodymyr Hrynyov, formed the Inter-Regional Bloc of Reforms alliance from December 1993.

While half of the USPP's members in 1996 were private enterprises, the body is dominated by state-owned enterprises, and academic Paul Kubicek has accused the USPP of exploiting its ties to Kuchma to delay privatisation of industry. Likewise, economist Vladimir Dubrovskiy has argued that the government's support for low-interest loans to state-owned industrial enterprises (a policy championed by the USPP) was the source of hyperinflation reaching rates of 10,000% by 1993, and characterises the USPP as a rent-seeking body.

Kuchma resigned from the USPP presidency in 1996, and he was briefly replaced by Anatolii Minchenko from 1996 to 1997 before Minchenko himself was replaced by Anatoliy Kinakh. Under Kinakh, the USPP has lobbied for the Ukrainian government to adopt a model of import substitution industrialisation.

== See also ==
- Russian Union of Industrialists and Entrepreneurs
