= Andrii Goncharuk =

Ukrainian statesman and diplomat

Andrii Goncharuk KmstkNO, L.d’H., C
- Андрій Гончарук
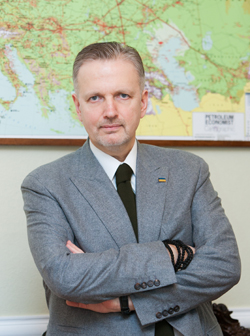
- Goncharuk in 2012

Advisor to the President of Ukraine, Director General for International Relations in Presidential Administration
- In office 5 April 2011 – 24 February 2014
- President: Viktor Yanukovych

Representative (Ambassador) of Ukraine to the WTO
- In office 15 April 2013 – July 2015

Deputy Chief of Staff of the President of Ukraine
- In office 31 March 2010 – 5 April 2011
- President: Victor Yanukovych

Deputy Chief of Staff of the President of Ukraine
- In office 27 March 2008 – 31 March 2010
- President: Victor Yushchenko

7th Minister for foreign economic relations and trade of Ukraine
- In office 27 January 1999 – 19 January 2000
- President: Leonid Kuchma
- Prime Minister: Valeriy Pustovoitenko

Personal details
- Born: 9 April 1961 (age 65) Kyiv, Ukrainian SSR, Soviet Union
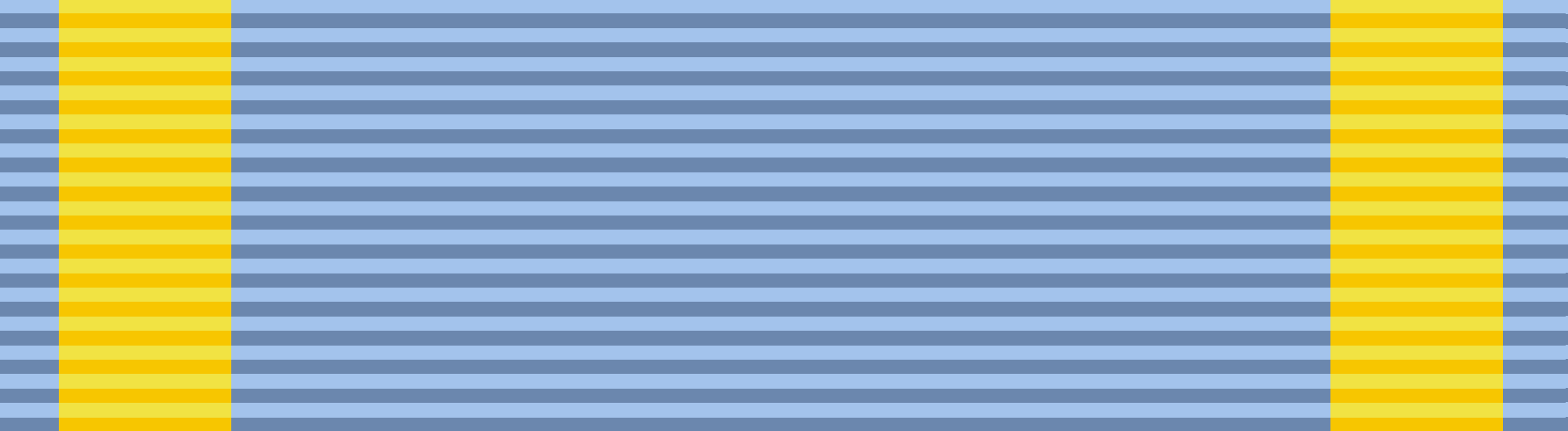
- Awards

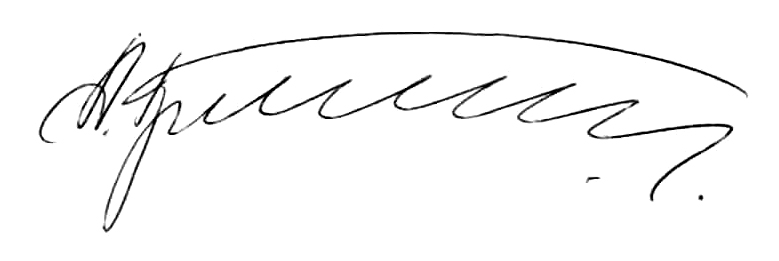
- Signature

Andrii Goncharuk (also spelled Honcharuk; Ukrainian: Андрій Іванович Гончарук; born April 9, 1961) is a Ukrainian statesman, diplomat, and ambassador.

== Early life and education ==
Goncharuk was born in Kyiv. He graduated from Taras Shevchenko National University of Kyiv (1983). After postgraduate studies in the Institute for World Economy and International Relations (National Academy of Sciences) he was awarded a Ph.D. degree in International Economics (1988). Named senior research fellow (1991) and associate professor (2013).

== A career in the Ministry for Foreign Economic Relations ==
After Ukraine became independent, Goncharuk joined the newly created Ministry for Foreign Economic Relations, starting as head of division in 1991 and subsequently moved up having stopped at all stages of promotional ladder. In 1999, he was appointed minister at the age of 37, being the youngest minister in Ukraine at that time.

Between 1993 and 2003, Goncharuk actively contributed to the process of Ukraine's accession to the GATT/WTO system conducting negotiations with foreign partners. He initiated and participated in development of a new direction of international relations of Ukraine – trade diplomacy.

Since 2000, he combined his state and diplomatic activities with research work and teaching. He held position of professor at the chair of international trade of Kyiv National Economic University (2005–2015).

== A career in private sector ==
After more than 10 years of civil service, in 2003 Andrii Goncharuk takes a decision to apply his knowledge in the private sector through his position of vice-president of the Interpipe Group where his main sphere of activities was trade policy as well as support and protection of Ukrainian companies at foreign markets. At the same time (2005-2007) he continues to advise Ukrainian Government on issues of multilateral trade diplomacy, in particular on Ukraine's accession to the WTO, as an advisor to the prime minister of Ukraine.

== Return to civil service ==
In 2008, after Ukraine's accession to WTO was appointed deputy chief of staff of the president of Ukraine. Being the president's de facto diplomatic advisor, he supervised all international issues, including those related to foreign economic relations. On April 15, 2013, Andrii Goncharuk was appointed Representative (Ambassador) of Ukraine to the World Trade Organization and Chair of the State Commission for Cooperation with the WTO.

On February 21, 2014, has submitted a letter of resignation.

Starting from April 2014, has worked closely with President Leonid Kravchuk as his diplomatic advisor.

From July 2014 till September 2019, Amb. Goncharuk was an independent member of New Ukraine Institute for Strategic Studies Supervisory Council.

In April 2015, Amb. Goncharuk was elected Vice-President of Ukrainian Foreign Policy Association.

Andrii Goncharuk holds the rank of Ambassador Extraordinary and Plenipontentiary. For his personal contribution to Ukraine's integration into the WTO, in 2008 he was decorated with the Order of Prince Yaroslav the Wise 5th class. Ambassador Goncharuk is a Commander Grand Cross (KmstkNO) Order of the Polar Star (1999), Commandeur Ordre national de la Légion d'honneur (2010).

He also has other distinctions of foreign states.

Mother tongue is Ukrainian. He is fluent in English and Russian.

== Personal life ==
He is married with two children and has granddaughter and three grandsons. He enjoys playing tennis, cycling, reading literature on history and is fond of Shih Tzu dogs.
