= Pavlo Kachur =

Ukrainian politician

- Павло Качур
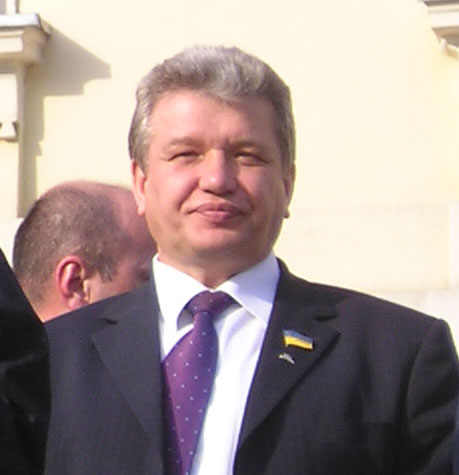
- Kachur in 2004

Governor of Sumy Oblast
- In office 26 December 2006 – 7 April 2008
- President: Viktor Yushchenko
- Preceded by: Volodymyr Sapsai
- Succeeded by: Mykola Lavryk

Minister of Construction, Architecture, and Public Housing and Utilities
- In office 28 September 2005 – 4 August 2006
- President: Viktor Yushchenko
- Prime Minister: Yuriy Yekhanurov
- Preceded by: Volodymyr Plitin
- Succeeded by: Volodymyr Rybak

People's Deputy of Ukraine
- In office 11 June 2002 – 6 October 2005
- Preceded by: Viktor Pynzenyk
- Succeeded by: Constituency abolished
- Constituency: Lviv Oblast, No. 117

Personal details
- Born: 8 December 1953 (age 72) Sosulivka, Ukrainian SSR, Soviet Union (now Ukraine)
- Party: People's Movement of Ukraine
- Other political affiliations: Our Ukraine Bloc
- Education: University of Lviv

Pavlo Stepanovych Kachur (Ukrainian: Павло Степанович Качур; born 8 December 1953) is a Ukrainian politician who served as Governor of Sumy Oblast on the appointment of President Viktor Yushchenko, serving from 2006 to 2008. Prior to this, he served as Minister of Construction, Architecture, and Public Housing and Utilities in the Yekhanurov government from September 2005 to April 2006, and as a People's Deputy of Ukraine for Ukraine's 117th electoral district between 2002 and 2005. He is a member of the People's Movement of Ukraine, and held office as a member of the Our Ukraine Bloc.

== Early life and career ==
In 1980, he graduated from the University of Lviv, Faculty of Applied Mathematics and Mechanics, mechanic. In 1994, he graduated from the Institute of Public Administration and Self-Government as a Master of Public Administration. He is a candidate of Physical and Mathematical Sciences.

== Political career ==
From April 1990 to August 1993 Kachur was Deputy Chairman of the Lviv City Council. A Member of the People's Movement of Ukraine, he was also a member of the Lithuanian Support Committee. He again served as First Deputy Chairman of the Lviv City Council from September 1994 to May 1996. Afterwards, he left for Kyiv to become deputy executive director of the Association of Ukrainian Cities, where he would stay until March 2000. In March 1999 he also became head of the Centre for Cooperation of Cities within the association. From September 2001 to April 2002 he was vice-president of the All-Ukrainian Union of Public Organizations "Association of Regional Development Agencies of Ukraine", also based in Kyiv.

Concurrently with these activities, Kachur was adviser to the Prime Minister of Ukraine Viktor Yushchenko between 9 March 2000 and 30 May 2001.

From 11 June 2002 to 6 October 2005 Kachur was a People's Deputy of Ukraine from the Our Ukraine Bloc, representing Ukraine's 117th electoral district. He was a member of the Committee on Budget. HisTerminated prematurely on 6 October 2005.

Kachur served as Minister of Construction, Architecture, and Public Housing and Utilities in the Yekhanurov government from 28 September 2005 to 4 August 2006. Afterwards, he again became an adviser to Yushchenko, this time in his capacity as President of Ukraine. He served in this position from 30 October to 26 December 2006, before being appointed by Yushchenko as Governor of Sumy Oblast.

Between 25 May 2007 to 21 January 2008 Kachur held a seat on the National Security and Defense Council of Ukraine.

== Post-political career ==
From 20 March 2008 to 2 April 2010 Kachur was a member of the National Council for Interaction between Public Authorities and Local Self-Government Bodies. Since June 2008 he has been executive director of the New Energy of Ukraine Alliance. He has also been vice-president of the Italian Chamber of Commerce and Industry in Ukraine since 2 October 2012.
