= Ivan Vasyunyk =

Ukrainian politician (born 1959)

Ivan Vasyunik
- Іван Васюник
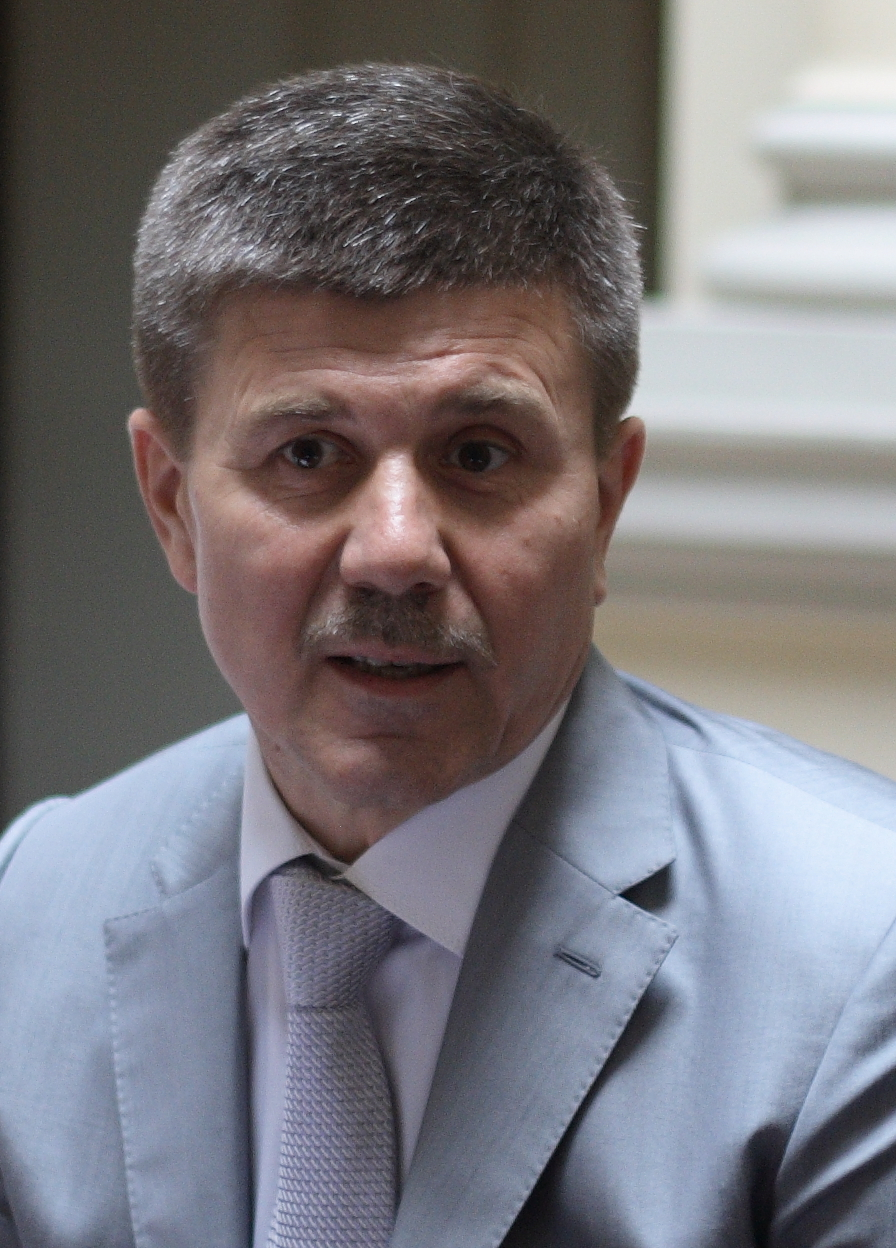
- Vasyunik in 2011

Advisor to Prime Minister
- In office February 2000 – May 2000
- President: Leonid Kuchma

Acting State Secretary
- In office 6 September 2005 – 7 September 2005
- President: Viktor Yushchenko

Personal details
- Born: 7 July 1959 (age 67) Velykyi Liubin, Lvov Oblast, Ukrainian SSR, Soviet Union

Ivan Vasylovych Vasyunik (Vasiunyk; Ukrainian: Іван Васильович Васюник, born 7 July 1959) is a Ukrainian politician, who served in various posts, including Deputy Prime Minister.

== Early life and education ==
Vasyunik was born on 7 July 1959. In 1981, he graduated from the Faculty of Economics at Ivan Franko State University of Lviv with a degree in "Organization of Mechanized Processing of Economic Information", engineer-economist.

1981–1985 — Secretary of the Komsomol Committee at Lviv University. Candidate of Economic Sciences (1989), Associate Professor (1991).

February 1993-March 1995 — First Deputy Director General, then Director General of the Lviv Institute of Management

April 1994–April 1997 — Head of the Advisory Group to First Deputy Prime Minister Viktor Pynzenyk.

June 1997–February 2000 and August 2001–April 2002 — Director of the NGO "Institute for Reforms", Kyiv.

== Career ==
February–May 2000 — Advisor to Prime Minister Viktor Yushchenko, Deputy Head of the Prime Minister's Office.

In April 2002, he was elected to the Verkhovna Rada of Ukraine as a member of the "Our Ukraine" bloc, ranked 43rd on the party list. He served as a member of the Committee on Economic Policy, National Economy Management, Property, and Investments.

Following Viktor Yushchenko’s victory in the presidential election, Vasyunik served as first deputy secretary of Presidential Administration of Ukraine until 2005. While serving as Acting Head of the Secretariat of the President of Ukraine, he chaired the supervisory board of the National Presidential Orchestra.

He was appointed acting presidential secretary on 6 September 2005. He replaced Oleksandr Zinchenko in the post.

From December 18, 2007 to March 11, 2010 Vasyunik vice prime minister to the cabinet led by Prime Minister Yulia Tymoshenko. At that position he was put in charge for the preparation to the Euro 2012.

He has been associated with the news website gazeta.ua.

== Awards ==
- Order of Prince Yaroslav the Wise, 5th Class (January 16, 2009)
- Order of Merit, 3rd Class (June 26, 2008)

Political offices
Preceded by Oleksandr Zinchenko	Head of Presidential Administration of Ukraine acting 6 September 2005 – 7 September 2005	Succeeded by Oleh Rybachuk
Preceded by Dmytro Tabachnyk	Vice Prime Minister (on humanitarian policy and EURO 2012); 18 December 2007 – 11 March 2010	Succeeded by Volodymyr Semynozhenko
