= Vyacheslav Kyrylenko =

Ukrainian politician

- В'ячеслав Кириленко
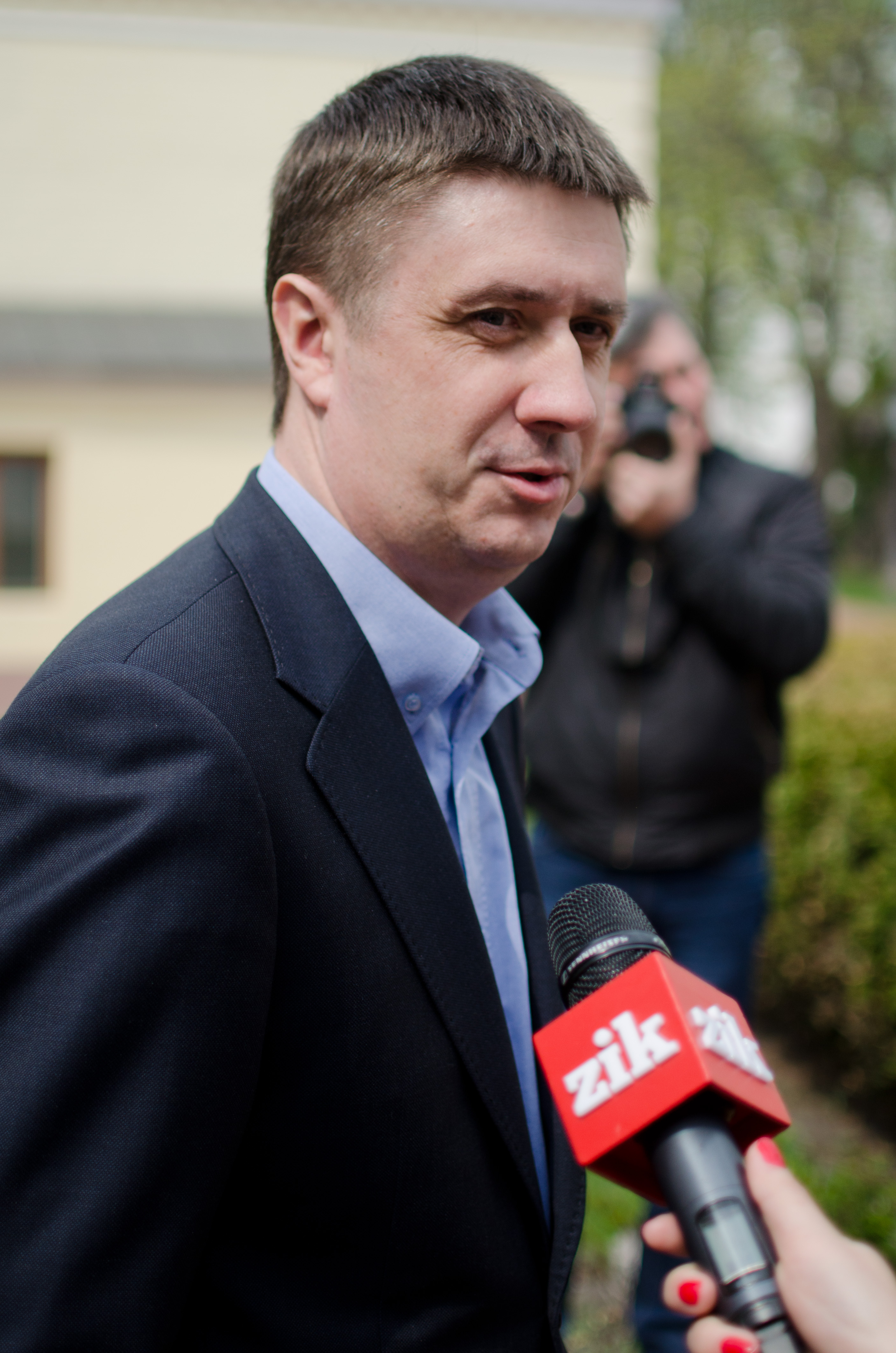
- Kyrylenko in 2015

Vice Prime Minister of Ukraine for humanitarian matters
- In office 2 December 2014 – 29 August 2019
- Prime Minister: Arseniy Yatsenyuk; Volodymyr Groysman
- Preceded by: Oleksandr Sych

Minister of Culture
- In office 2 December 2014 – 14 April 2016
- Prime Minister: Arseniy Yatsenyuk
- Preceded by: Yevhen Nyshchuk
- Succeeded by: Yevhen Nyshchuk

Vice-Prime Minister of Ukraine (humanitarian matters)
- In office 27 September 2005 – 4 August 2006
- Prime Minister: Yuriy Yekhanurov
- Preceded by: Mykola Tomenko
- Succeeded by: Dmytro Tabachnyk

Minister of Labor and Social Policy of Ukraine
- In office 4 February 2005 – 27 September 2005
- Prime Minister: Yulia Tymoshenko
- Preceded by: Mykhailo Papiev
- Succeeded by: Ivan Sakhan

People's Deputy of Ukraine

3rd convocation
- In office 12 May 1998 – 14 May 2002
- Constituency: People's Movement of Ukraine, No.18

4th convocation
- In office 14 May 2002 – 3 March 2005
- Constituency: Our Ukraine, No.20

5th convocation
- In office 25 May 2006 – 8 June 2007
- Constituency: Our Ukraine, No.6

6th convocation
- In office 23 November 2007 – 12 December 2012
- Constituency: Our Ukraine, No.2

7th convocation
- In office 12 December 2012 – 27 November 2014
- Constituency: Batkivshchyna, No.6

8th convocation
- In office 27 November 2014 – 2 December 2014
- Constituency: People's Front, No.8

Personal details
- Born: May 18, 1968 (age 58) Poliske, Ukrainian SSR, Soviet Union
- Party: People's Front
- Other political affiliations: For Ukraine! (2009–2014); People's Movement of Ukraine (1993–2002); Ukrainian People's Party (2002–2005); People's Union Our Ukraine (2007–2009)
- Spouse: Kateryna
- Children: Daughter and son
- Education: Taras Shevchenko National University of Kyiv
- Occupation: Politician
- Website: www.kyrylenko.com.ua

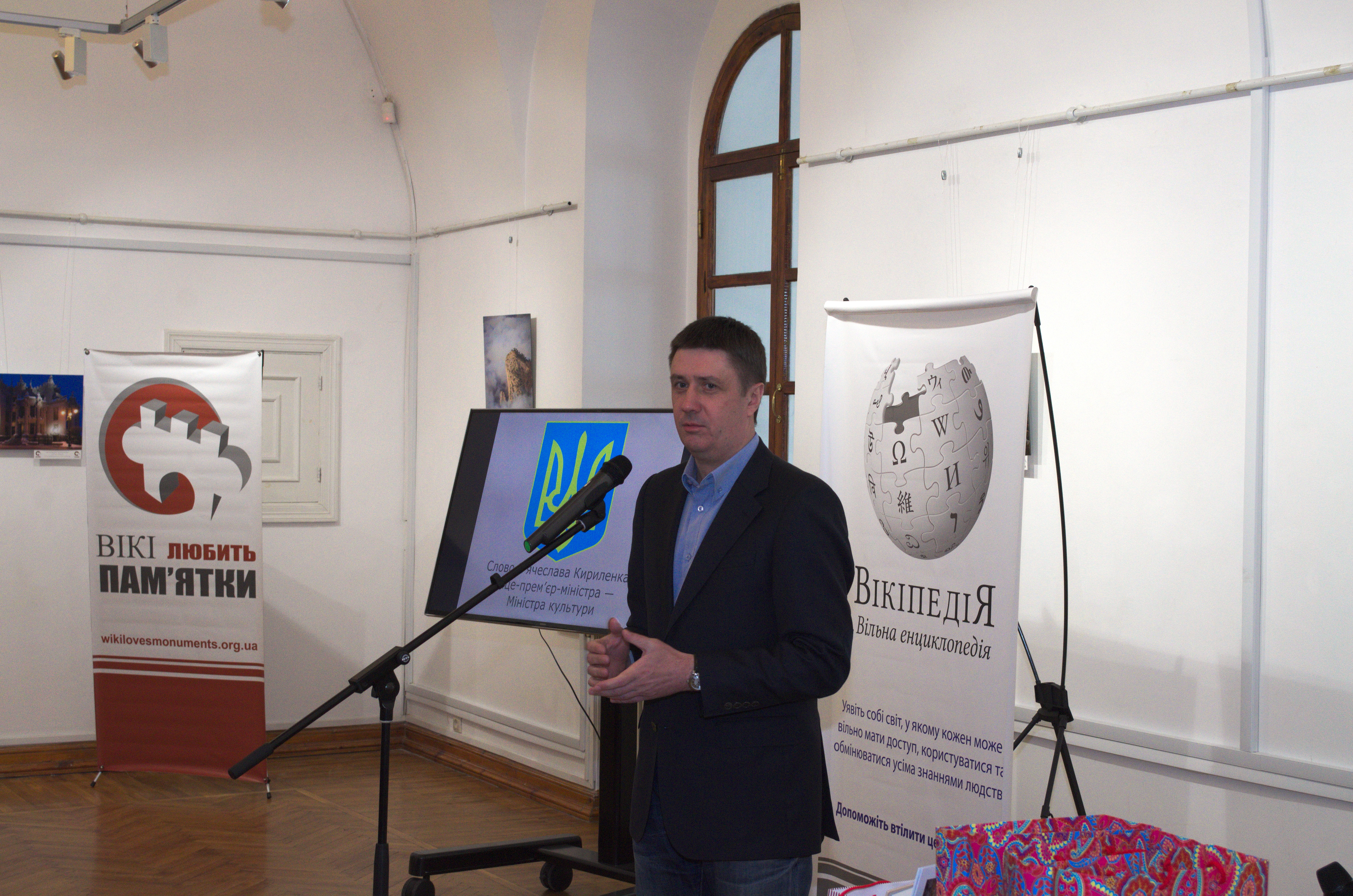
Kyrylenko is a supporter of Wikipedia project in Ukraine.

Vyacheslav Anatoliiovych Kyrylenko (Ukrainian: В'ячеслав Анатолійович Кириленко) is a Ukrainian politician; former Minister of Labor and Social Policy, Vice Prime Minister, former party leader of Our Ukraine and former leader of the party For Ukraine!. Since September 2014 he is one of the leaders of the party People's Front.

== Biography ==
During his studies at the Taras Shevchenko National University of Kyiv Kyrylenko was one of the initiators of a political student strike at the October Revolution Square in Kyiv, the so-called Revolution on Granite which was held from October 12 to 17, 1990, which eventually led to the resignation the Chairman of the Council of Ministers of Ukraine Vitaly Masol. In the years 1992 and 1993 Kyrylenko was head of the Ukrainian Student Union and became a member of the People's Movement of Ukraine. He soon became the head of the youth wing of this party and stayed that until 2002 while meanwhile becoming a Doctor of Philosophy at Taras Shevchenko National University of Kyiv (in 1993 he graduated from the Faculty of Philosophy and he received a PhD in Philosophy in 1997).

In 2002 Kyrylenko became the Deputy Head of the Ukrainian People's Party. During the 1998 Ukrainian parliamentary election Kyrylenko was elected into the Verkhovna Rada (Ukraine's parliament); he has been re-elected into the Verkhovna Rada since. In 2005 Kyrylenko became the Minister of Labor and Social Policy in the first Tymoshenko Government and a Vice Prime Minister later that year in the Yekhanurov Government until the 2006 Ukrainian parliamentary election. In December 2006 Kyrylenko was elected as Head of the Parliamentary Faction "Our Ukraine" and on March 31, 2007 was elected the head of the People's Union Our Ukraine. During the 2007 Ukrainian parliamentary election was Kyrylenko the top candidate of Our Ukraine–People's Self-Defense Bloc on its party list. The alliance lost 9 seats but its percentage of total votes slightly improved.

In 2008 Kyrylenko was replaced as head of Our Ukraine party of its Honorary President Viktor Yushchenko. In December Kyrylenko resigned from the post as head of Our Ukraine–People's Self-Defense Bloc in protest against the reformation of the coalition that supported the second Tymoshenko Government with Bloc of Lytvyn. According to Kyrylenko the restructure posed "a serious threat to the economy and social sphere". On December 23, 2008 Kyrylenko formed the parliamentarian deputy group For Ukraine! in the Verkhovna Rada. In November 2009 Kyrylenko started to cooperate with the Party of Social Protection In order to participate in the 2010 Ukrainian local elections. In November 2009 the Party of Social Protection changed its name to For Ukraine! and Kyrylenko was elected party leader of it.

In November 2009 Kyrylenko was awarded the Order of Prince Yaroslav the Wise V degree.

In December 2011 Kyrylenko signed an agreement with the head of the party Front for Change Arseniy Yatsenyuk on joint opposition activity and merger of their parties after the election.

Kyrylenko was placed at number 4 on the electoral list of Batkivshchina during the 2012 Ukrainian parliamentary election. He was elected into parliament.

Kyrylenko was instrumental in the attempt to repeal the national 2012 Law "On the Principles of State Language Policy". On 23 February 2014, the second day after the flight of Viktor Yanukovich, while in a parliamentary session Kyrylenko moved to include in the agenda a draft that would repeal this legislation. The motion was carried with 232 deputies voting in favour, the draft was included into the agenda, immediately put to a vote and approved with the same 232 voting in favour. Repeal of the 2012 Law was met with great disdain in Crimea and Southern and Eastern Ukraine provoking waves of anti-government protests, ultimately culminating with the Crimean crisis. The acting President Oleksandr Turchinov announced on February 28, 2014 that he won't be signing the law into action, but this reaction came too late to curb the unfolding crisis.

In September 2014 Kyrylenko became a founding member of his new party People's Front.

Since December 2, 2014 - Vice-Prime Minister, Minister of Culture of Ukraine.

April 14, 2016 - Vice-Prime Minister of Ukraine.

== Family ==
Kyrylenko is married to Kateryna Mykhailivna who is a philosophy lecturer at the Kyiv National University of Culture and the Arts. They have a son and a daughter.

== Earnings ==
According to an electronic declaration in 2019, Vyacheslav Kyrylenko received a salary of ₴405,974 (US$15,036) as Vice Prime Minister of Ukraine. On bank accounts (JSC "Oschadbank"), Vyacheslav Kyrylenko had ₴15,362 (US$596). He also declared US$1,200 in cash. Additionally, Vyacheslav Kyrylenko had apartment (total area of 154,80 m2) and apartment (total area of 53,20 m2) in joint ownership (33%). Vyacheslav Kyrylenko also declared a 2013 Skoda Superb car.

Political offices
Preceded by Mykhailo Papiev	Minister of Labor and Social Policy of Ukraine; 2005	Succeeded by Ivan Sakhan
Preceded by Mykola Tomenko	Vice-Prime Minister of Ukraine (in Humanitarian Affairs); 2005–2006	Succeeded by Dmytro Tabachnyk
