= Kateryna Kyrylenko =

- Катерина Кириленко
- Born: Kateryna Martyniuk; 1971 (age 54–55); USSR
- Spouse: Vyacheslav Kyrylenko
- Children: 2

Academic background
- Education: Cherkasy National University

Academic work
- Discipline: Pedagogy
- Institutions: Kyiv National University of Culture and Arts

Kateryna Mykhailivna Kyrylenko (née Martyniuk; Ukrainian: Катерина Михайлівна Кириленко; born 1971) is a Ukrainian teacher of philosophy, professor of philosophy at Kyiv National University of Culture and Arts (since 2014), and the spouse of Ukrainian minister and politician Vyacheslav Kyrylenko. She became famous after getting her Doctor of Sciences degree in pedagogy in November, 2015 and opposition of Ukrainian scientific community to it.

== Early life ==
Kateryna Martyniuk was born in the family of university teacher Mykailo Martyniuk who later became a chancellor of Pavlo Tychyna Uman State Pedagogical University.

She graduated from Bohdan Khmelnytsky National University of Cherkasy as a teacher of Russian language. She entered PhD program of Taras Shevchenko National University of Kyiv and successfully defended her thesis "Cultural philosophy of Osip Mandelstam".

While studying in Kyiv University Kateryna met and married her husband Vyacheslav Kyrylenko. They have a son and a daughter.

Kateryna Kyrylenko teaches philosophy in Kyiv National University of Culture and Arts (KNUCA). Since March 2014 she occupies the Chair of philosophy. She wrote an illustrated textbook, Philosophy: science and culture.

== Thesis controversy ==
In May 2015 chief editor of "Museums of Ukraine" magazine Victor Tregub announced that Kyrylenko's textbook "Culture and science" contained plagiarism of multiple authors' texts including students' essays.

On October 15, 2015, at National University of Life and Environmental Sciences of Ukraine Kateryna Kyrylenko defended her thesis on "Theoretical and methodological basis for the formation of innovation culture of future culturologists in higher educational establishment". Ministry of Education and Science of Ukraine approved her defence and awarded her an academic degree of Doktor nauk (Doctor of Sciences) in pedagogics.

Nevertheless, D.Sc. in philosophy Tetyana Parkhomenko found multiple plagiarism paragraphs in Kyrylenko's thesis and forced the Ministry to start an investigation. Parhomenko's accusations were supported by physicists as some paragraphs contained pseudoscientific claims like "The soul is incapable of practical activity unless it is embodied in an organic form. A lepton “God”, whose mind in its original form was identical with its lepton body, creates a variety of its “bodily organs”." Vadym Loktiev, Academic-Secretary (chairman) of Physics and Astronomy Department in National Academy of Sciences of Ukraine asked Ministry to withdraw Kyrylenko's degree. In February 2016 science activists posted a petition to Ukrainian political leaders on Avaaz platform to dismiss degree awarding for plagiarism and pseudoscience content of the thesis. Other scientists alleged that at least one scientific paper (necessary for obtaining the degree) was published in a fake journal.

Kateryna Kyrylenko and her husband denied all accusations in plagiarism and described situation as political pressure. She also postulated that physicists cannot evaluate her pedagogical thesis.

Special research council of H.S. Skovoroda Kharkiv National Pedagogical University declared in May, 2016 that Kyrylenko's thesis is a work of independent scientific research which nevertheless contains "1.4 % of unsourced text borrowings". On July 1, 2016, Ministry of Education and Science college refused to withdraw doctoral degree from Kateryna Kyrylenko because no specialized councils had asked the Ministry to do this, as minister Liliya Hrynevych commented.

Later in April, 2017 Ukrainian Language-Information Foundation of National Academy of Sciences conducted expert research of Kyrylenko's thesis and recognized 26% of whole text as plagiarism and found out 696 different mistakes as well.

== Sources ==
- Sergei Sharapov. A Lepton «God»: Proof of the Collapse in the Ukrainian Scientific Degree Awarding System. VoxUkraine, 12-08-2016
