= For Ukraine! =

For Ukraine! За Україну!
- Leader: Vyacheslav Kyrylenko
- Founded: October 9, 1999 (Party of Social Protection); February 21, 2009 (For Ukraine!)
- Headquarters: Kyiv
- Ideology: Conservatism
- Political position: Centre-right
- Colours: Blue; Yellow
- Verkhovna Rada: 0 / 450
- Regions (2015): 20 / 158,399

For Ukraine! (Ukrainian: За Україну!, romanized: Za Ukrainu!) is a political party in Ukraine, headed by Vyacheslav Kyrylenko. Legally it is the successor of Party of Social Protection.

== History ==
=== Party of Social Security ===
The Party of Social Security was established on October 9, 1999, as the People's Party of Depositors and Social Security and registered with the Ministry of Justice in May of the next year. It only took part in the 2006 Ukrainian parliamentary election where it won 0.05% of the votes and no seats.

=== For Ukraine! ===
On December 23, 2008 Vyacheslav Kyrylenko, a former chairman of Our Ukraine and he was the frontrunner of Our Ukraine–People's Self-Defense Bloc during the 2007 Ukrainian parliamentary election, formed the parliamentarian deputy group For Ukraine in the Verkhovna Rada (the Ukrainian parliament). At the constituent congress of the movement Vyacheslav Kyrylenko was elected its leader on February 21, 2009. In November 2009 Kyrylenko started to cooperate with the Party of Social Protection (registered in May 2000), in order to participate in the 2010 Ukrainian local elections. In November 2009 the Party of Social Protection changed its name to For Ukraine!.

In the 2010 local elections For Ukraine! won representatives in municipalities and 1 seat in the Ivano-Frankivsk Oblast Council and Volyn Oblast Council and 2 seats in the Sumy Oblast Council (regional parliaments of the Ivano-Frankivsk Oblast, Volyn Oblast and Sumy Oblast).

In February 2011 Kyrylenko stated his "For Ukraine" would unify with Front for Change and Ukraine United to create one single party before the 2012 parliamentary election. In December 2011 Kyrylenko signed an agreement with the head of the party Front of Changes, Arseniy Yatsenyuk, on joint opposition activity and merger of their parties after the election. They competed as a single party under the "umbrella" of "Fatherland", together with Front of Changes and several other parties, during the October 2012 parliamentary elections. During the election this list won 62 seats (25.55% of the votes) under the proportional party-list system and another 39 by winning 39 simple-majority constituencies; a total of 101 seats in Parliament.

When Front of Changes merged into "Fatherland" in June 2013 the party did not merge with them as planned but instead kept its independence.

The party did not participate in the 2014 Ukrainian parliamentary election as Kyrylenko and many members have been active in the newly founded People's Front since 2014.
