= Oleksandr Sych =

Ukrainian politician

- Олександр Сич
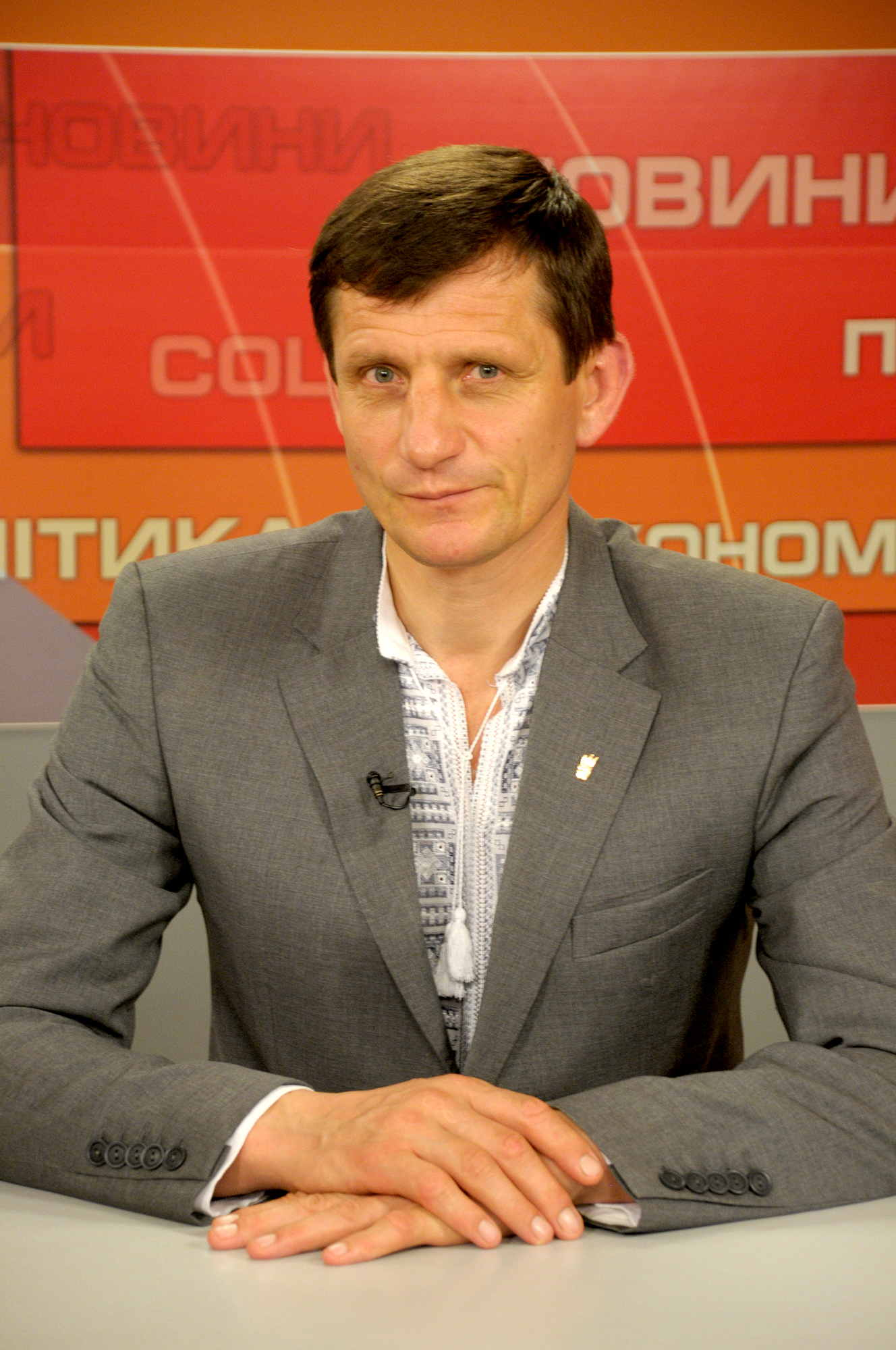
- Sych in 2012

Chairman of Ivano-Frankivsk Oblast Council
- Incumbent
- Assumed office 7 December 2015
- Preceded by: Vasyl Skrypnychuk
- In office 25 November 2010 – 23 November 2012
- Preceded by: Ihor Oliynyk
- Succeeded by: Vasyl Skrypnychuk

Vice Prime Minister of Ukraine
- In office 27 February 2014 – 12 November 2014
- Prime Minister: Arseniy Yatsenyuk
- Preceded by: Kostyantyn Gryshchenko
- Succeeded by: Vyacheslav Kyrylenko

Personal details
- Born: 16 July 1964 (age 62) Dert, Rivne Oblast, Ukrainian SSR, Soviet Union
- Party: Svoboda
- Education: Vasyl Stefanyk Subcarpathian National University
- Occupation: Lawyer

Oleksandr Maksymovych Sych (Ukrainian: Олександр Максимович Сич; born 16 July 1964) is a Ukrainian politician. He is a member of the Svoboda party. On 27 February 2014 he became one of two "Vice Prime Ministers" to the Deputy Prime Minister of Ukraine following the Revolution of Dignity. On 12 November 2014, Sych and his fellow two Svoboda ministers in the Yatsenyuk Government resigned and became acting ministers until a new government was formed.

== Biography ==
In 1986, Sych graduated from the Vasyl Stefanyk Subcarpathian National University as a history teacher and in 1999 as a lawyer. Sych is a candidate of historic sciences (2009) and a docent of the Ivano-Frankivsk National Technical University of Oil and Gas. In 1993 to 1999, he was a member of the far-right Congress of Ukrainian Nationalists.

He was elected to the 7th Ukrainian Verkhovna Rada during the 2012 Ukrainian parliamentary election as a member of the VO Svoboda party.

Sych is a member of Plast.

=== Euromaidan and post-Ukrainian revolution ===
Following Euromaidan and the removal of former Ukrainian president Viktor Yanukovych, Sych was appointed to the position of Vice Prime Minister in the new Ukrainian government. He and other Svoboda cabinet ministers resigned on 12 November 2014, due to the results of the early parliamentary elections.

In October 2015, the Ivano-Frankivsk police conducted a house search of Sych's apartment.

=== Political views ===
Sych holds right-wing, nationalist views, which he maintains are distinct from fascism and Nazism. In April 2013, three Svoboda officials, including Sych registered a bill that would ban abortions in Ukraine with the only exceptions being if the pregnancy threatened a woman's life, if the pregnancy occurred through rape or if the fetus developed defects in its pathology. One of the major reasons behind the bill appears to be the demographics of Ukraine. Sych publicly stated that women should "lead the kind of lifestyle to avoid the risk of rape, including refraining from drinking alcohol and being in controversial company", comments which, according to The Guardian, attracted criticism from women's and human rights organisations.

Sych considers Ukrainian nationalism to be threatened by "the Communist Russian regime and liberal Europe".

== Personal life ==
Sych is married, and has a son and a daughter.
