= Mayor of Dnipro =

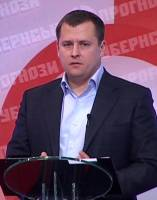
Current mayor Borys Filatov

The following is a list of the mayors and political chiefs of the Dnipro city administration, covering the period from 1786 to the present day. Originally the city was known as Yekaterinoslav. Dnipro is Ukraine's third largest city with over a million inhabitants, and is a major industrial and financial centre.

The position was established sometime in 1786 when the city merchant Ivan Shevelyov was elected the first head of the city. Since 1999 the city's chief administration position (city mayor) is elected by popular vote and officially known as Head of the city.

== Name of the position ==
- 1786 - 1917 Head of the city
- 1917 - 1941 unknown (either Head of the city's council or executive committee)
- 1943 - 1998 Head of the city's executive committee (according to the city's web portal)
- 1999 - present Head of the city (City mayor)

== Russian Empire ==
=== Yekaterinoslav ===
List of mayors and political chiefs of the Dnipro city administration
Date	Name in English	Name	Post
Jun 1786–1787	Ivan Shevelev	Шевелев Иван	mayor
1791–1794	Dmitri Yemelianovich Goriainov	Горяинов Дмитрий Емельянович	mayor
1794–1796	Peter Ivanovich Bashmakov	Башмаков Петр Иванович	mayor

=== Novorossiysk ===
List of mayors and political chiefs of the Dnipro city administration
Date	Name in English	Name	Post
1796–1797	Gregory Kustov	Кустов Григорий	mayor
1797–1800	Dmitri Yemelianovich Goriainov	Горяинов Дмитрий Емельянович	mayor
1800–1803	Kuzma Molchanov	Молчанов Кузьма	mayor

=== Yekaterinoslav ===
List of mayors and political chiefs of the Dnipro city administration
Date	Name in English	Name	Post
1803–1806	Peter Chetverikov	Четвериков Петр	mayor
1806–1809	Athanasius Kokhanov	Коханов Афанасий	mayor
1809–1811	Stephan Chetverikov	Четвериков Степан	mayor
1811–1812	Dmitri Yemelianovich Goriainov	Горяинов Дмитрий Емельянович	mayor
1812–1817	Ivan Vasilievich Kolesnikov	Колесников Иван Васильевич	mayor
1818–1821	Demian Kiselev	Киселев Демьян	mayor
1821–1825	Ivan Vasilievich Kolesnikov	Колесников Иван Васильевич	mayor
1825–1828	Jacob Andreivich Rokhlin	Рохлин Яков Андреевич	mayor
Jan 1828 – Apr 1828	Ivan Stepanovich Pcholkin	Пчелкин Иван Степанович	mayor
Apr 1828 – Sep 1828	Ivan Vasilievich Kolesnikov	Колесников Иван Васильевич	mayor
1830–1833	Fedor Safronovich Duplenko	Дупленко Федор Сафронович	mayor
1833–1834	Jacob Andreivich Rokhlin	Рохлин Яков Андреевич	mayor
1834–1836	Andrei Ivanovich Kirpishnikov	Кирпишников Андрей Иванович	mayor
1836–1839	Jacob Andreivich Rokhlin	Рохлин Яков Андреевич	mayor
1839–1842	Ivan Timothyvich Artamonov	Артамонов Иван Тимофеевич	mayor
1842–1843	Ilya Ivanovich Tarkhov	Тархов Илья Иванович	mayor
1843–1846	Thomas Fedorovich Bogdanov	Богданов Фома Федорович	mayor
1846–1847	Procopius Andreivich Belyavskii	Белявский Прокопий Андреевич	acting mayor
1847–1851	Ivan Izotovich Lovyagin	Ловягин Иван Изотович	mayor
Apr 1851–1854	Procopius Andreivich Belyavskii	Белявский Прокопий Андреевич	mayor
1854–1860	Ivan Izotovich Lovyagin	Ловягин Иван Изотович	mayor
1860–1861	Yegor Ptitsyn	Птицын Егор	acting mayor
Nov 1861–1864	Ivan Izotovich Lovyagin	Ловягин Иван Изотович	mayor
1864–1864	Dei Mikhailovich Minakov	Минаков Дей Михайлович	acting mayor
1864–1865	Konstantin Demyanovich Kiselev	Киселев Константин Демьянович	mayor
1865–1868	Dei Mikhailovich Minakov	Минаков Дей Михайлович	mayor
1868–1871	DV Pcholkin	Пчелкин Д. В.	mayor
1871–1877	Dei Mikhailovich Minakov	Минаков Дей Михайлович	mayor
1877–1885	Peter Vasilievich Kalabuhov	Калабухов Петр Васильевич	mayor
1885–1888	Ivan Mikhailovich Yakovlev	Яковлев Иван Михайлович	mayor
7 Feb 1889–1893	Alexander Yakovlevich Tolstikov	Толстиков Александр Яковлевич	mayor
1893–1901	Ivan Gavrilovic Grekov	Греков Иван Гаврилович	mayor
1901–1901	Alexander Yakovlevich Tolstikov	Толстиков Александр Яковлевич	mayor
1901–1902	Peter Filippovich Volkov	Волков Петр Филиппович	acting mayor
1902 – Nov 1905	Alexander Yakovlevich Tolstikov	Толстиков Александр Яковлевич	mayor
Nov 1905 – 26 Nov 1909	Ivan Yakovlevich Esau	Эзау Иван Яковлевич	mayor
1909 – 17 Mar 1917	Ivan Vasilievich Sposobny	Способный Иван Васильевич	mayor

== Ukraine ==
(Ukrainian People's Republic)

List of mayors and political chiefs of the Dnipro city administration
Date	Name in English	Name	Post
1917–1917	Kostyantyn Ihorevych Makarenko	Макаренко Константин Игорьевич	acting mayor
Aug 1917–1917	Vasyl Ivanovych Osypov	Осипов Василий Иванович	mayor
1918 – 1 Feb 1919	Ivan Yakovych Ezau	Эзау Иван Яковлевич	mayor

== Ukrainian SSR ==
=== Dnepropetrovsk / Dnipropetrovsk ===
List of mayors and political chiefs of the Dnipro city administration
Date	Name in English	Name	Post
1927–1928	Fedor Fedorovich Ryazanov	Рязанов Фёдор Фёдорович	chief of municipal executive committee
1929–1929	Bogdanova	Богданова Анна Ефимовна	chief of municipal executive committee
1929–1933	Pavel Sorokin	Сорокин Павел Дмитриевич	head of the municipal council (soviet)
1930–1932	Fedor Ivanovich Zaitsev	Зайцев Федор Иванович	first secretary of the city party committee
1933–1933	Kisilev	Кисилев	head of the municipal council (soviet) and urban executive committee
1933–1933	Nikolai Vasilievich Golubenko	Голубенко Николай Васильевич	head of the municipal council (soviet) and urban executive committee
1933–1936	Ivan Andreevich Gavrilov	Гаврилов Иван Андреевич	head of the municipal council (soviet) and urban executive committee
1934–1934	Miroshnichenko	Мирошниченко	head of the municipal council (soviet) and urban executive committee
1935–1935	Belyaev	Беляев	head of the municipal council (soviet) and urban executive committee
1935–1936	Rudenko	Руденко	head of the municipal council (soviet) and urban executive committee
Dec 1936 – Jul 1937	Peter Constantinovich Vetrov	Ветров Петр Константинович	municipal party committee secretary
1937–1937	Petrichenko	Петриченко	head of the municipal council (soviet) and urban executive committee
Nov 1937 – 24 Feb 1938	Demian Sergeivich Korotchenko	Коротченко Демьян Сергеевич	acting first secretary of the municipal committee CP
24 Feb 1938 – Jun 1938	Semen Borisovich Zadionchenko	Задионченко Семен Борисович	acting first secretary of the municipal committee CP
Jun 1938 – Jul 1941	Semen Borisovich Zadionchenko	Задионченко Семен Борисович	first secretary of the urban committee CP
1938–1938	Khrenov	Хренов	head of the municipal council (soviet) and urban executive committee
1939–1939	Martynov	Мартынов	head of the municipal council (soviet) and urban executive committee
Dec 1939 – Jul 1941	Nikolai Anisimovich Shchelokov	Щелоков Николай Анисимович	chief of municipal executive committee
1941–1942	Rudolf Klostermann	Клостерман Рудольф	commissioner of the city on behalf of the Third Reich
1941–1943	PT Sokolovsky	Соколовский П. Т.	head of city council
1943–1945	Didenko Gavrilovich Manzyuk	Манзюк Николай Гаврилович	first secretary of the city party committee
1943–1944	GP Vinnik	Винник Г. П.	chief of municipal executive committee
1944–1945	Gerasimov	Герасимов	chief of municipal executive committee
1945–1947	Pavel Andreevich Naydenov	Найденов Павел Андреевич	first secretary of the urban committee CP
1945–1952	Nikolai Evstafevich Gavrilenko	Гавриленко Николай Евстафьевич	chief of municipal executive committee
1947–1950	Leonid Ilyich Brezhnev	Брежнев Леонид Ильич	first secretary of the urban committee CP
1952–1957	Nikolai Andreevich Raspopov	Распопов Николай Андреевич	chief of municipal executive committee
1957–1963	Nikolai Evstafevich Gavrilenko	Гавриленко Николай Евстафьевич	chief of municipal executive committee
1961–1964	Viktor Mikhailovich Chebrikov	Чебриков Виктор Михайлович	first secretary of the city party committee
1963–1964	Grigory Mikhailovich Sokurenko	Сокуренко Григорий Михайлович	chief of municipal executive committee
1964–1967	Boris Ivanovich Karmazin	Кармазин Борис Иванович	chief of municipal executive committee
1964–1970	Ivan Vasilievich Yatsuba	Яцуба Иван Васильевич	first secretary of the city party committee
1967–1970	Eugene Viktorovich Kachalovskaya	Качаловский Евгений Викторович	chief of municipal executive committee
1970–1974	Eugene Viktorovich Kachalovskaya	Качаловский Евгений Викторович	first secretary of the city party committee
1970–1974	Victor Grigorievich Boyko	Бойко Виктор Григорьевич	chief of municipal executive committee
1974–1976	Victor Grigorievich Boyko	Бойко Виктор Григорьевич	first secretary of the city party committee
1974–1981	Ivan Afanasievich Lyakh	Лях Иван Афанасьевич	chief of municipal executive committee
1976–1983	Vladimir Petrovich Oshko	Ошко Владимир Петрович	first secretary of the city party committee
1981–1989	Alexander Vasilivich Migdeev	Мигдеев Александр Васильевич	chief of municipal executive committee
1983–1988	Nikolai Grigorievich Omelchenko	Омельченко Николай Григорьевич	first secretary of the city party committee
Dec 1988–1991	Vladimir Grigorievich Yatsuba	Яцуба Владимир Григорьевич	first secretary of the city party committee
Oct 1989 – Mar 1991	Pustovoitenko, Valery Pavlovich	Пустовойтенко Валерий Павлович	chief of municipal executive committee
Oct 1990–1991	Vladimir Grigorievich Yatsuba	Яцуба Владимир Григорьевич	head of city council

== Ukraine ==
=== Dnipropetrovsk ===
List of mayors and political chiefs of the Dnipro city administration
Date	Name in English	Name	Post
Mar 1991 – Apr 1993	Valery Pavlovych Pustovoitenko	Пустовойтенко Валерий Павлович	head of city council
1991–1993	Valery Pavlovych Pustovoitenko	Пустовойтенко Валерий Павлович	chief of municipal executive committee
Apr 1993 – Jun 1994	Victor Timofiyovych Merkushov	Меркушов Виктор Тимофеевич	head of the committee and city council
Jun 1994 – Oct 1999	Mykola Antonovych Shvets	Швец Николай Антонович	head of the committee and city council
Apr 1999 – Jan 2000	Ivan Ivanovych Kulichenko	Куличенко Иван Иванович	acting mayor
Jan 2000 – Oct 2014	Ivan Ivanovych Kulichenko	Куличенко Иван Иванович	mayor
Oct 2014 – Mar 2015	Maksym Romanenko	Максима Романенко	acting mayor
Mar 2015 – Nov 2015	Halyna Bulavka	Галина Булавка	acting mayor
Nov 2015 – 2016	Borys Albertovich Filatov	Філатов Борис Альбертович	mayor

=== Dnipro ===
List of mayors and political chiefs of the Dnipro city administration
Date	Name in English	Name	Post
2016 – present	Borys Albertovich Filatov	Філатов Борис Альбертович	mayor

== See also ==
- Dnipro history
- History of Dnipro city (in German)
