= Oleksandr Zinchenko (politician) =

Ukrainian politician (1957–2010)

- Олександр Зінченко
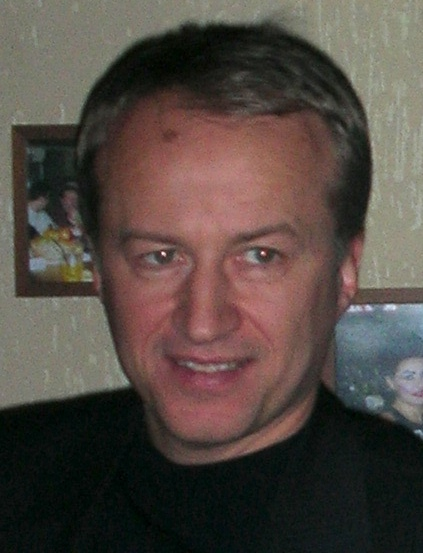
- Zinchenko in 2005

Head of the State Space Agency of Ukraine
- In office 11 February 2009 – 17 March 2010
- Preceded by: Yuriy Aleksieiev
- Succeeded by: Yuriy Aleksieiev

State Secretary of Ukraine
- In office 24 January 2005 – 6 September 2005
- President: Viktor Yushchenko
- Preceded by: Viktor Medvedchuk
- Succeeded by: Oleh Rybachuk

People's Deputy of Ukraine
- In office 12 May 1998 – 17 March 2005
- Constituency: Social Democratic Party of Ukraine (united), No. 7 (1998–2002); Social Democratic Party of Ukraine (united), No. 3 (2002–2005)

Personal details
- Born: 16 April 1957 Slavuta, Ukrainian SSR, Soviet Union (now Ukraine)
- Died: 9 June 2010 (aged 53) Kyiv, Ukraine
- Resting place: Baikove Cemetery and Russian Academy of Public Service
- Party: Communist Party of the Soviet Union (1983–1992); SDPU(o) (1998–2003); Our Ukraine (2005); Union of Patriotic Forces; Yulia Tymoshenko Bloc
- Education: Chernivtsi University

Oleksandr Oleksiyovych Zinchenko (Ukrainian: Олександр Олексійович Зінченко; 16 April 1957 – 9 June 2010) was a Ukrainian politician who was Director-General of the National Space Agency of Ukraine from 2009 to 2010. Oleksandr Zinchenko had a controversial career that includes Soviet Komsomol leadership, business in Russia and Ukraine, participation in the pro-Leonid Kuchma Social Democratic Party of Ukraine (united), survival of cancer and joining the anti-Kuchma opposition.

Zinchenko was an Academician of the National TV Academy of Ukraine and has received the Honored Journalist of Ukraine award. He was married to a TV host, Iryna, and had two daughters, Kateryna and Oleksandra.

== Biography ==
Zinchenko was born in Slavuta (Khmelnytskyi Oblast, then Ukrainian SSR) on 16 April 1957. He graduated with a degree in physics from Chernivtsi University, where from 1983 to 1985 he headed the Komsomol youth organization. From 1993 to 1995 Zinchenko headed Ometa-Merkantail and the joint stock company Balchug in Kyiv. In 1996 he was appointed director of the Ukraine-Express information agency and worked as president of Inter TV in 1996 he also joined the Social Democratic Party of Ukraine (united) (SDPU(o)).

Zinchenko became the SDPU(o)’s chief deputy chairman (vice-Speaker) of the Verkhovna Rada (parliament) in 1998 and headed the party’s parliament faction. In 2000, he chaired the parliament’s Freedom of Speech and Information Committee, which international media watchdogs criticized for doing little to bolster the freedom of speech in Ukraine. One of the tapes (dated May 2000) recorded by Kuchma's former bodyguard, Major Mykola Melnychenko in President Kuchma office (revealed during the Cassette Scandal) Zinchenko seemed to talk with Kuchma about efforts to co-opt critical journalists and harass media outlets. Zinchenko was re-elected to the Verkhovna Rada in 2002 on a SDPU(o) ticket.

In June 2004, Zinchenko was appointed campaign manager for Viktor Yushchenko during the 2004 Ukrainian presidential election and after Yushchenko victory served as a chief of the President's office for Yushchenko in 2005. In September 2005 he resigned from the latter position in protest against corruption he alleged was taking place in the inner circle of the President, mainly accusing Petro Poroshenko. In December 2005 he created the political party Oleksander Zinchenko’s Patriotic Forces Party of Ukraine.

Zinchenko was a member of the Kyiv City Council for Bloc Yulia Tymoshenko from the 2008 Kyiv local election till his resignation in June 2009 he was the faction leader.

On 13 February 2009, he was appointed Director General of the National Space Agency of Ukraine, he was relieved of this post in March 2010.

Oleksandr Zinchenko died on 9 June 2010 at the age of 53, and was buried at Kyiv's Baikove Cemetery on 11 June. Ukrainian politicians Yulia Tymoshenko, Oleksandr Turchynov, Mykola Tomenko and Borys Tarasyuk were present at his funeral.

Political offices
Preceded by Viktor Medvedchuk	Head of the Presidential Administration; 2005	Succeeded by Ivan Vasiunyk
Government offices
Preceded by Yuri Alekseyev	Director of the State Space Agency; 2009–2010	Succeeded by Yuri Alekseyev
