= Office of the President of Ukraine =

Government agency of Ukraine

Coordinates: 50.4445°N 30.5290°E

Presidential Office
- Офіс президента
- Logo

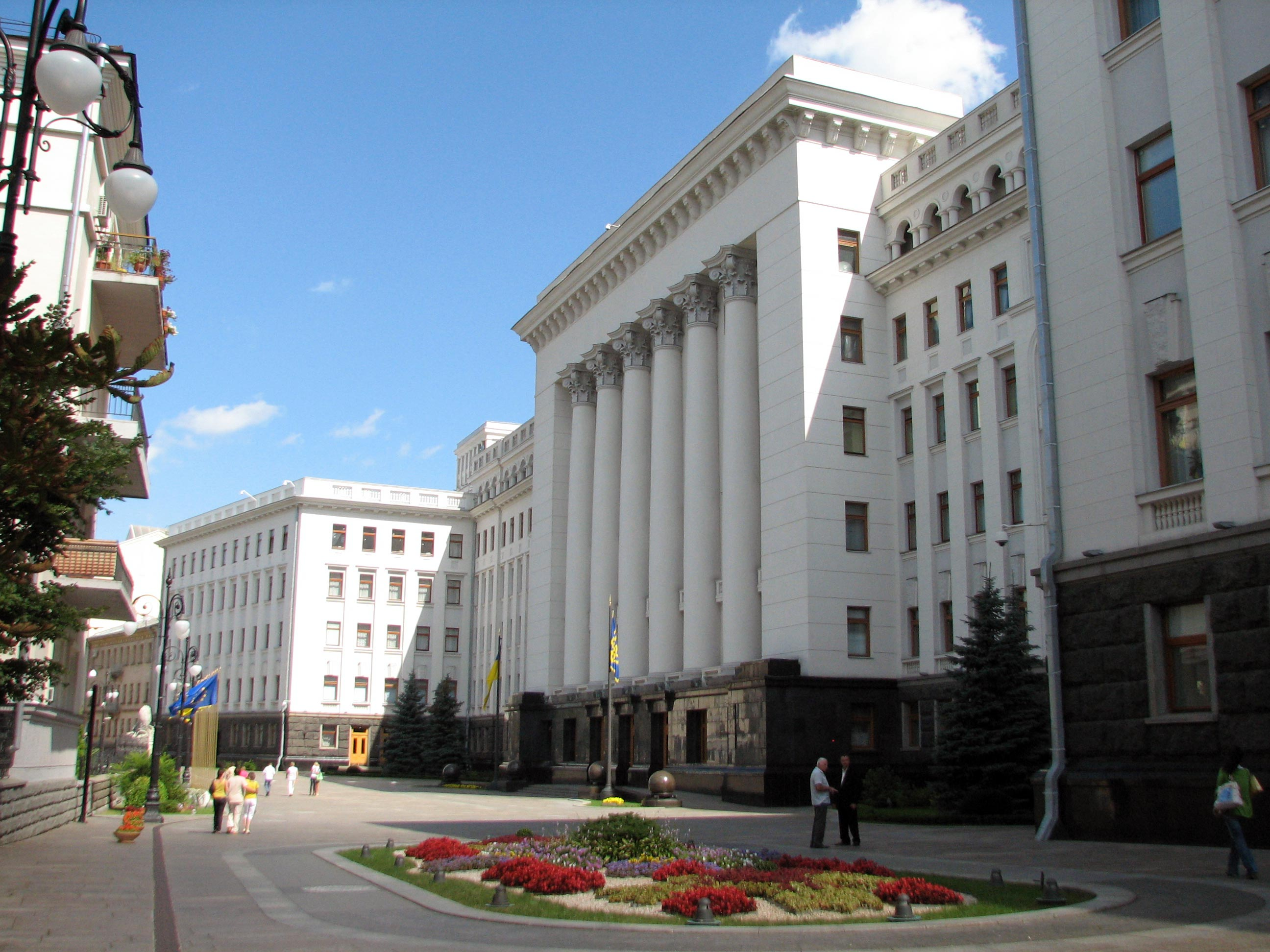
- The Presidential Office in central Kyiv.

Agency overview
- Formed: 25 February 2010
- Preceding agency: Presidential Administration
- Jurisdiction: Government of Ukraine
- Headquarters: Kyiv, Ukraine, Bankova, 11
- Employees: 400
- Annual budget: ₴1.03 billion
- Agency executive: Kyrylo Budanov, Head of the Office of the President
- Parent agency: State Management of Affairs (administering Office building only)
- Website: president.gov.ua/en

The Office of the President of Ukraine (Ukrainian: Офіс Президента України, romanized: Ofis Prezydenta Ukrainy, pronounced [ˈɔfis prezɪˈdɛntɐ ʊkrɐˈjinɪ]), formerly the Administration of the President of Ukraine, (Note: Адміністрація Президента, Administratsiia Prezydenta [ɐd⁽ʲ⁾min⁽ʲ⁾iˈstrɑts⁽ʲ⁾ijɐ prezɪˈdɛntɐ]) is a standing advisory body set up by the President of Ukraine pursuant to clause 28, Article 106 of the Constitution of Ukraine. The Office consists of its Head, Deputies of the Head, Chief of Staff, First Assistant to the President, Advisors, Authorized Advisors, Press Secretary, Representatives of the President, Cabinet of the President, Cabinet of the Head of the Office, Services, Directorates, and Departments.

== Overview ==
After Ukraine declared independence in 1991, President Leonid Kravchuk established the Administration of the President on 13 December as an advisory body to the President (the Ukrainian SSR formally ceased to exist on 26 December 1991). The Administration is headquartered on 11 Bankova in Kyiv.

President Leonid Kuchma kept the name Administration for the period of his two terms in office.

Under President Yushchenko, the administration was reorganized into the Secretariat on 24 January 2005 in accordance with Clause 28 of Article 106 of the Constitution of Ukraine.

President Viktor Yanukovych restored the name Administration of the President of Ukraine on 25 February 2010. On 20 June 2019 President Volodymyr Zelenskyy signed a decree that transformed the Presidential Administration of Ukraine into the Office of the President of Ukraine.

The Office consists of the Head of the Office of the President of Ukraine, Deputies of the Head, Chief of Staff, First Assistant to the President, Advisors, Authorized Advisors, Press Secretary, Representatives of the President, Cabinet of the President, Cabinet of the Head of the Office, Services, Directorates, and Departments.

On 2 January 2026, Kyrylo Budanov was appointed to replace Andriy Yermak as the Head of the Office of the President of Ukraine.

== Heads of the Administration / Secretariat / Office ==
=== List of Chiefs-of-Staff ===
Secretary of the Presidential Administration
#	Picture	Chief	Years	President of Ukraine
1		Mykola Khomenko	13 December 1991 – 15 July 1994	Leonid Kravchuk
Chief-of-Staff of the Presidential Administration
#	Picture	Chief	Years	President of Ukraine
1		Dmytro Tabachnyk	21 July 1994 – 10 December 1996	Leonid Kuchma
2		Yevhen Kushnariov	20 December 1996 – 23 November 1998	Leonid Kuchma
3		Mykola Biloblotsky	25 November 1998 – 22 November 1999	Leonid Kuchma
4		Volodymyr Lytvyn	22 November 1999 – May 2002	Leonid Kuchma
5		Viktor Medvedchuk	12 June 2002 – 21 January 2005	Leonid Kuchma
State Secretary
#	Picture	Chief	Years	President of Ukraine
6		Oleksandr Zinchenko	24 January 2005 – 6 September 2005	Viktor Yushchenko
–		Ivan Vasiunyk (acting)	6 September 2005 – 7 September 2005	Viktor Yushchenko
7		Oleh Rybachuk	7 September 2005 – 22 September 2005	Viktor Yushchenko
Chief-of-Staff of the Secretariat of the President
#	Picture	Chief	Years	President of Ukraine
7		Oleh Rybachuk	22 September 2005 – 15 September 2006	Viktor Yushchenko
8		Viktor Baloha	15 September 2006 – 19 May 2009	Viktor Yushchenko
9		Vira Ulyanchenko	19 May 2009 – 24 February 2010	Viktor Yushchenko
Chief-of-Staff of the Presidential Administration
#	Picture	Chief	Years	President of Ukraine
10		Serhiy Lyovochkin	25 February 2010 – 17 January 2014	Viktor Yanukovych
11		Andriy Klyuyev	24 January 2014 – 23 February 2014	
–		Oleh Rafalsky (acting)	26 February 2014 – 5 March 2014	Oleksandr Turchynov (acting)
–		Serhiy Pashynskyi (acting)	5 March 2014 – 10 June 2014	Oleksandr Turchynov (acting)
12		Boris Lozhkin	10 June 2014 – 29 August 2016	Petro Poroshenko
13		Ihor Rainin	29 August 2016 – 21 May 2019	Petro Poroshenko
Head of President's Office
#	Picture	Chief	Years	President of Ukraine
14		Andriy Bohdan	21 May 2019 – 11 February 2020	Volodymyr Zelenskyy
15		Andriy Yermak	11 February 2020 – 28 November 2025	Volodymyr Zelenskyy
16		Kyrylo Budanov	2 January 2026 –	Volodymyr Zelenskyy

== Structure ==
- Cabinet of the President of Ukraine
- Cabinet of the Head of the Office of the President of Ukraine
- State Protocol and Ceremonials Service
- Directorate for Legal Policy
- Directorate for Foreign Policy and Strategic Partnership
- Directorate for Justice and Law Enforcement
- Directorate for Regional Policy
- Directorate for Economic Policy
- Directorate for National and Humanitarian Policy
- Directorate for Information and Media Policy
- Social Policy and Health Care Directorate
- European and Euro-Atlantic Integration Department
- National Security and Defense Department
- Document Control Department
- Department for Citizenship, Pardon and State Awards
- Department for Public Queries
- HR Department
- Information Technologies Department
- Department for Interaction with the Parliament and Government
- Center for Coordination with the Cabinet of Ministers of Ukraine and the Verkhovna Rada of Ukraine
- State Administrative Department
