= Oleh Rybachuk =

Ukrainian politician

- Олег Рибачук
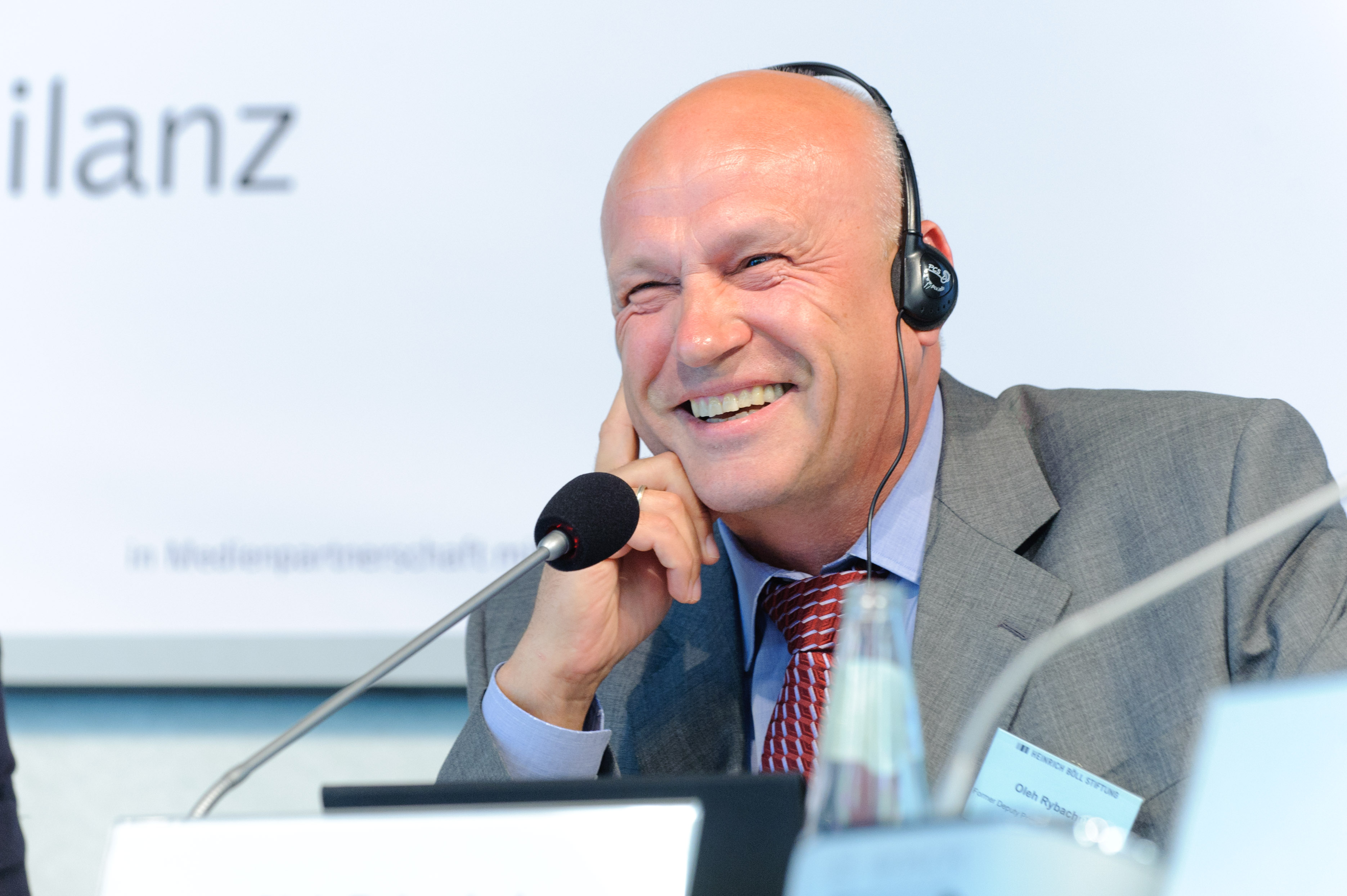
- Rybachuk in 2011

State Secretary of Ukraine (the Chief of Staff to the President of Ukraine)
- In office September 7, 2005 – September 16, 2006
- President: Viktor Yushchenko
- Preceded by: Oleksandr Zinchenko
- Succeeded by: Viktor Baloha

Deputy Prime Minister of Ukraine on European Integration
- In office February 4, 2005 – September 7, 2005
- President: Viktor Yushchenko
- Prime Minister: Yulia Tymoshenko

Personal details
- Born: Oleh Borysovych Rybachuk; April 22, 1958 (age 67) Pohrebyshche, Vinnytsia Oblast, Ukrainian SSR, Soviet Union (now Ukraine)
- Citizenship: Ukraine

Oleh Borysovych Rybachuk (Ukrainian: Олег Борисович Рибачук; born 22 April 1958) is a Ukrainian politician and public figure.

== Biography ==
Oleh Rybachuk graduated from the Faculty of Philology of Taras Shevchenko National University of Kyiv (1975-1980) with a degree in English and French languages and earned the second higher education diploma at the Finance and Credit Faculty of Kyiv National Economic University (1993-1996) with a qualification in economics. In 1997, studied at the Georgetown University School of Foreign Service United States.

== Career ==
- From 1980 to 1986 worked as an Inspector and a Senior Inspector at the Kyiv Customs.
- In 1986 - 1991 employed as an English translator at TO "Zakordonnaftobud" in the Republic of India.
- In 1992 — Head of the Department of foreign exchange transactions at Kyiv Joint Stock Commercial Exchange Bank «Kyyivbirzhbank».
- From 1992 to 1999 served as Chief of the Foreign Relations Department, Head of the International Banking Relations Department, Director of the International Relations Department of the National Bank of Ukraine.
- In 1999-2001 served as the Head of Prime Minister's Office in the Secretariat of Cabinet of Ministers of Ukraine.
- In 2001-2002 — Vice-President of the Black Sea Trade and Development Bank (Thessaloniki, Greece).
- In April 2002 was elected a Member of Parliament of Ukraine (4th convocation) from the Viktor Yushchenko Bloc «Our Ukraine» and served through March 2005. As an MP was appointed the Head of the Parliamentary group “Together” of the “Our Ukraine” fraction, as well as the authorized representative of the fraction, the Head of the Subcommittee on Banking and Currency Regulation of the Committee on Finance and Banking. Headed the service of the leader of «Our Ukraine» Bloc and the presidential candidate Viktor Yushchenko.
- From February 4 till September 7, 2005 — Deputy Prime Minister of Ukraine on European Integration.
- From September 7, 2005 to September 16, 2006 appointed the State Secretary of Ukraine, the Chief of Staff to the President of Ukraine Viktor Yushchenko.
- In May–October 2006 — the Secretary of the Political Council under the President of Ukraine.
- From October 2005 to September 2006 was a member of the National Security and Defense Council of Ukraine.
- In September 2006 appointed an Advisor to the President of Ukraine.
- From December 2007 – non-staff Advisor to the President of Ukraine.
- On March 4, 2008 was exempt from duties of the presidential advisor after his public statement, that the Chief of Staff to the President of Ukraine Viktor Baloha does not always present the opinion of the President.
- 2006 - 2008 — Chairman of the Supervisory Council of JSC "Oschadbank”. Member of the Supervisory Council of JSC “Ukreximbank”.
- From December 2008 to May 2016 — member of the Supervisory Council of PJSC "ArcelorMittal Kryvyi Rih".
- From 2009 – until now — Chairman and co-founder of the NGO «Centre UA», also one of the initiators of the «New Citizen» Public Campaign, the Civil movement "Chesno", the coalition of civil society organizations "Reanimation Package of Reforms". Co-founder of the think tank "Collegium of Anna Yaroslavna".

== Euromaidan ==
According to the Financial Times, Rybachuk's New Citizen organization had “played a big role in getting the [Euromaidan] protest up and running.”

== Accusation for special services work ==
According to The Washington Times, an anonymous source within the British intelligence said Rybachuk was an agent of the Soviet and later Russian Main intelligence directorate (GRU). Rybachuk previously mentioned contacts with the KGB during the Soviet times, explaining in a 2017 interview that in the Soviet Union there was no possibility to work abroad without any special services connection. He disowned the accusation that he was an agent for the Russian special services and said that the respective information diffusion in Ukrainian news media was a special-order campaign designed by the Executive Office of the President against him.

== See also ==
- Svitlana Zalishchuk

Political offices
Preceded by Ivan Vasyunyk	Head of the Presidential Administration; 2005–2006	Succeeded by Viktor Baloha
