= Ivano-Frankivsk Oblast Council =

Legislature of Ivano-Frankivsk Oblast, Ukraine

Type
- Type: Unicameral
- Houses: 1

Leadership
- Speaker: Oleksandr Sych

Structure
- Seats: 84
- Political groups: Government (48): Freedom (18); For the Future (16); Fatherland (14); Opposition (36): European Solidarity (17); Community Platform (10); Servant of the People (9)

Elections
- Last election: 25 October 2020

Meeting place
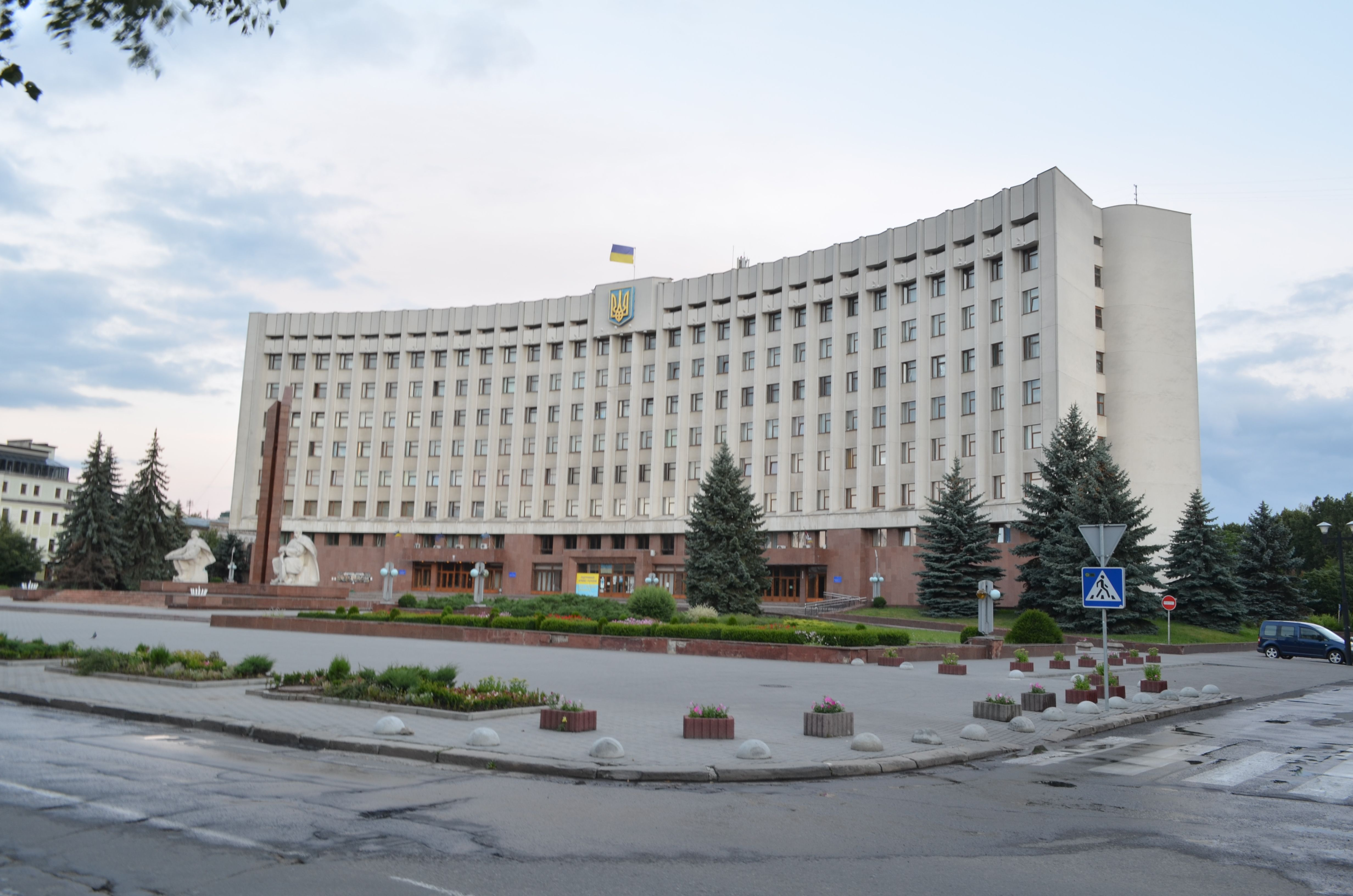
- Ivano-Frankivsk, Ivano-Frankivsk Oblast

Website
- https://orada.if.ua/

The Ivano-Frankivsk Oblast Council (Ukrainian: Івано-Франківська обласна рада) is the regional oblast council (parliament) of the Ivano-Frankivsk Oblast (province) located in western Ukraine.

Council members are elected for five year terms. In order to gain representation in the council, a party must gain more than 5 percent of the total vote.

== Recent elections ==
=== 2020 ===
Distribution of seats after the 2020 Ukrainian local elections

- 18 Svoboda
- 17 European Solidarity
- 16 For the Future
- 14 Fatherland
- 10 Community Platform
- 9 Servant of the People

Election date was 25 October 2020

=== 2015 ===
Distribution of seats after the 2015 Ukrainian local elections

- 23 Solidarity
- 18 Fatherland
- 16 Svoboda
- 12 UKROP
- 8 Self Reliance
- 7 Volia

Election date was 25 October 2015

== Leaders of the region ==
=== Head of the executive committee ===
- 1939–1941 Maxim Kozenko
- 1941–1944 Nazi occupation
- 1944–1945 Maxim Kozenko
- 1945–1946 Ivan Ryasichenko
- 1946–1949 Filipp Shcherbak
- 1949–1952 Efim Kobzin
- 1952–1955 Yuri Pantelyuk
- 1955–1979 Pyotr Kaykan
- 1979–1990 Vadim Boychuk
- 1990 Dmitry Zakharuk
- 1990–1991 Vasyl Pavlyk

=== Head of the council ===
- 1990–1992 Mykola Yakovyna
- 1992–1998 Stepan Volkovetskyi
- 1998–2002 Zinoviy Mytnyk
- 2002–2006 Vasyl Brus
- 2006–2010 Ihor Oliynyk
- 2010–2012 Oleksandr Sych
- 2012–2015 Vasyl Skrypnychuk
- 2015–present Oleksandr Sych
