= Pavlo Ihnatenko =

Ukrainian politician

- Павло Ігнатенко
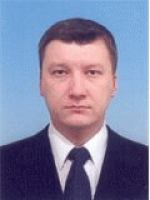
- Ihnatenko in 2002

Minister of Natural Environment Protection
- In office 4 February 2005 – 4 August 2006
- Prime Minister: Yulia Tymoshenko; Yuriy Yekhanurov
- Preceded by: Serhiy Polyakov
- Succeeded by: Vasyl Dzharty

People's Deputy of Ukraine

4th convocation
- In office 14 May 2002 – 3 March 2005
- Constituency: Our Ukraine Bloc, No. 38

Personal details
- Born: 2 June 1973 (age 53) Nizhyn, Chernihiv Oblast, Ukrainian SSR, Soviet Union
- Party: Our Ukraine (since 2005)
- Education: Kyiv National Economic University

Pavlo Mykolayovych Ihnatenko (Ukrainian: Павло Миколайович Ігнатенко; born 2 June 1973) is a Ukrainian economist and politician.

Ihnatenko graduated from Kyiv National Economic University with a degree in Finance in 1994. He held management positions in financial and banking companies.

In 2006, he became an advisor to President Viktor Yushchenko, a position he held until 2008. From 2009 to 2011, he served as Deputy Secretary of the National Security and Defense Council of Ukraine.
