= Volodymyr Semynozhenko =

Ukrainian politician and scientist

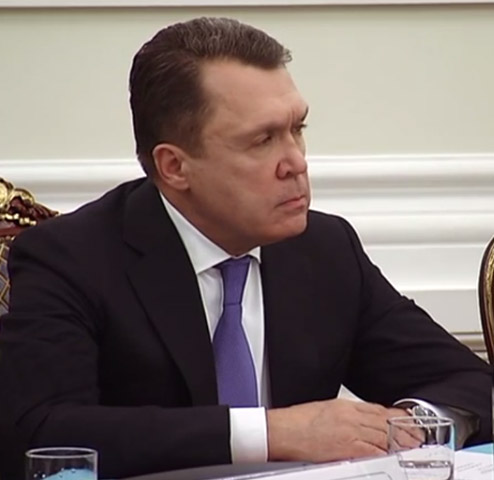
Volodymyr Semynozhenko

Volodymyr Petrovych Semynozhenko (Ukrainian: Володи́мир Петро́вич Семино́женко) (born 9 June 1950) is a Ukrainian politician and scientist, who served as the Vice Prime Minister of Ukraine for humanitarian policy from May 2001 to November 2002, and again for four months in 2010. He created and headed the Ministry of Science and Technology of Ukraine from 1996 to 1998, served as the Chair of the Parliamentary Committee on Sciences and Technology, and led various technology and innovation committees in the Cabinet of Ministers. He was head of the Association of Ukrainian Scientists, and is now a member of the board of the National Academy of Sciences of Ukraine.

Semynozhenko was the leader of the Party of Regions from late 2001 until early 2003, and the New Politics party from March 2009. In 2019 he also stood unsuccessfully for the Strength and Honor party.

== Education ==
Semynozhenko graduated with honors in 1967 from the Magnet School specializing in physics and mathematics. He graduated from Kharkiv State University's School of Physics and Technology in 1972. In 1974, Semynozhenko defended his Ph.D. dissertation, and in 1984 acquired his doctorate in physics and mathematics. In 1988 he became a professor, and in 1992 he was accepted to the National Academy of Sciences of Ukraine.

== Scientific work ==
Semynozhenko is a board member for the National Academy of Sciences of Ukraine, a professor, author of more than 500 scientific papers and books, and the holder of more than 80 patents.

From 1975 to 1985 he worked at the B Verkin Institute for Low Temperature Physics and Engineering of the National Academy of Sciences of Ukraine. In 1985 he became the head of the Ukraine State Scientific Institution "Institute for Mono Crystals" of the National Academy of Sciences of Ukraine.

== Politics ==
=== Scientific posts ===
Semynozhenko was first elected as a deputy in the Ukrainian parliament (Verkhovna Rada) in 1994. He served as the Ukrainian Minister for Science and Technology from 1996 to 1998. He was Science and Technology Advisor to the President of Ukraine (1999, 2001–2002, 2003–2005), and in 2006 he was appointed Innovation Advisor to the Prime Minister of Ukraine. That same year, he became the president of the Civic and Political Leaders' Association, also known as the "Ukrainian Forum", whose purpose is to analyse national and political trends and their effect on Ukraine and the rest of the world.

During his career, Semynozhenko has been the head of several different parliament committees in Verkhovna Rada, including the Parliament Committee for Social, Science and Technology and Humanitarian Development and the Ukrainian Investment Fund for Social Investment, Environmental Committee.

=== Party politics ===
Semynozhenko was the party leader of the Party of Regions from late 2001 until early 2003.

On March 11, 2010, Semynozhenko was elected vice prime minister in the Azarov Government, responsible for 16 policy areas including healthcare, education, intellectual property, advertising, exhibition activities, and language policy. A motion to dismiss Semynozhenko was submitted in the Verkhovna Rada on 31 March 2010 by lawmaker Olha Bodnar of Bloc Yulia Tymoshenko. He was removed as vice prime minister on 2 July 2010. The following week he was appointed head of the State Committee for Science, Innovation and Information Support and appointed adviser to Prime Minister Mykola Azarov.

In March 2009 Semynozhenko was elected leader of the New Politics party. In the 2012 Ukrainian parliamentary election the party won 0.10% of the vote, and failed to win parliamentary representation.

Semynozhenko also took part in the 2019 Ukrainian parliamentary election, this time for the party Strength and Honor. He received 13.9% of the vote in his constituency of Kharkiv and was not elected.

== Honors and awards ==
Semynozhenko was twice awarded the National Award of Ukraine in Science and Technology. He was awarded "For the National Service" of I, II and III degrees, by order of Saint Volodymir the Great, of the IV degree. He was given an honorable letter of commendation by the Cabinet of Ministers of Ukraine and the Verkhovna Rada.

Semynozhenko has been bestowed with the title of Honorary Professor from more than 50 universities, including:

- Ivan Franko National University of L'viv
- Karazin Kharkiv National University
- National Technical University "Kharkov Polytechnical Institute"
- National University "Ostroh Academy"
- National Mining University
- Luhansk State Medical University

In 1999 he was named an Honorary Professor of Art at Kharkov State Academy of Design and Art.

== Sources ==
- gska2.rada.gov.ua
- ukraine-children.org.ua
- ludinaroku.com.ua
- nas.gov.ua

Political offices
Preceded by Ivan Vasyunyk	Vice Prime Minister (on humanitarian policy); 11 March 2010 – 2 July 2010	Succeeded by Kostyantyn Gryshchenko
Preceded by Mykola Zhulynskyi	Vice Prime Minister (on humanitarian policy); 30 May 2001 – 26 November 2002	Succeeded by Dmytro Tabachnyk
Party political offices
Preceded by Mykola Azarov	Leader of the Party of Regions; 2002–2003	Succeeded by Viktor Yanukovych
