= Party of Industrialists and Entrepreneurs of Ukraine =

Party of Industrialists and Entrepreneurs of Ukraine Партія промисловців і підприємців України
- Abbreviation: PPPU
- Leader: Anatoliy Kinakh
- Founded: 20 April 2000
- Political position: Centre
- Colours: Blue; Yellow

Website
- pppu.org.ua (archived)

The Party of Industrialists and Entrepreneurs of Ukraine (PPPU; Ukrainian: Партія промисловців i підприємців України, romanized: Partiia promyslovtsiv i pidpryiemtsiv Ukrainy) is a political party in Ukraine registered in April 2000. Former Ukrainian Prime Minister Anatoliy Kinakh is one of its most noticeable members.

== History ==
At the parliamentary elections on 30 March 2002, the party was part of the For United Ukraine alliance. Party leader Anatoliy Kinakh was First Vice Prime Minister in the first Tymoshenko Government

At the parliamentary elections on 26 March 2006, the party took part in the new Our Ukraine bloc. At the early parliamentary elections parliamentary on September 30, 2007, party-members participated in the elections on the Party of Regions election-list.

In the 2010 local elections the party won 1 representatives in 3 regional parliaments and 6 in the Lviv Oblast.

The party did not participate in the 2012 parliamentary elections. And again not in the 2014 Ukrainian parliamentary election.

== Election results ==
Supreme Council of Ukraine
Year	Popular vote	% of popular vote	Overall seats won	Seat change	Government
2002	For United Ukraine bloc		6 / 450	▲6	coalition government
2006	Our Ukraine bloc		0 / 450	▼22	coalition government
2007	joined Party of Regions				opposition
2012	X				
2014	X				
