= Anatoliy Kinakh =

Ukrainian politician

- Анатолій Кінах
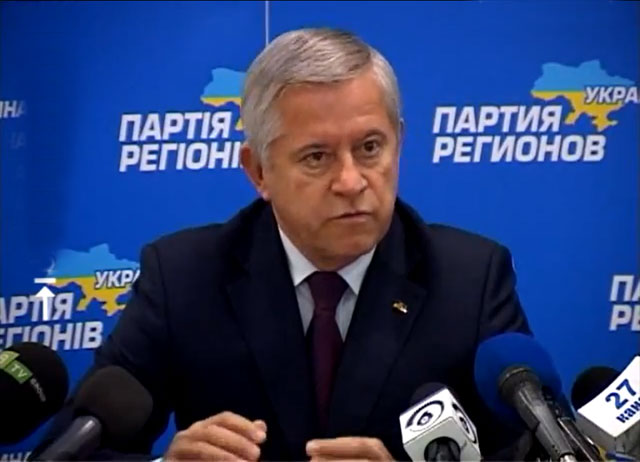
- Kinakh in 2012

8th Prime Minister of Ukraine
- In office 29 May 2001 – 21 November 2002
- President: Leonid Kuchma
- Preceded by: Viktor Yushchenko
- Succeeded by: Viktor Yanukovych

First Vice Prime Minister of Ukraine
- In office February 2005 – September 2005
- Prime Minister: Yulia Tymoshenko

Secretary of the National Security and Defense Council
- In office 27 September 2005 – 16 May 2006
- Preceded by: Petro Poroshenko
- Succeeded by: Volodymyr Horbulin

Chairman of the Mykolaiv Oblast Council
- In office June 1994 – August 1996
- Preceded by: Ivan Hritsay
- Succeeded by: Volodymyr Chaika

Personal details
- Born: Anatoliy Kyrylovych Kinakh; 4 August 1954 (age 72) Brătușeni, Brătușeni Raion, Moldavian SSR, Soviet Union
- Party: Party of Industrialists and Entrepreneurs as part of the Party of Regions
- Other political affiliations: Party of Industrialists and Entrepreneurs of Ukraine
- Spouse: Maryna Volodymyrivna (1960)
- Children: Natalia (1980), Zoia (1984), Sofiya (2000)
- Education: Leningrad Shipbuilding Institute
- Occupation: Politician, professor
- Website: http://www.kinakh.com.ua/

Anatoliy Kyrylovych Kinakh (Ukrainian: Анатолій Кирилович Кінах, Ukrainian pronunciation: [ɐnɐˈtɔlʲii̯ kɪˈrɪlowɪt͡ʃ ˈkʲinɐx]; born 4 August 1954) is a Ukrainian politician and honorary professor at the Mykolaiv Government Humanitarian University. Kinakh is a former (long serving) People's Deputy of Ukraine. Kinakh currently serves as the leader of Party of Industrialists and Entrepreneurs of Ukraine.

Previously, Kinakh was a Prime Minister from 2001 to 2002 under President Leonid Kuchma, a first vice-Prime Minister and a Minister of Economy of Ukraine. Since 1996 Kinakh has been president of Ukrainian Union of Industrialists and Entrepreneurs trade association.

== Biography ==
Anatoliy Kinakh was born in the village of Brătușeni in the Moldavian SSR (now Moldova) on 4 August 1954. In 1978, he graduated from the Leningrad Shipbuilding Institute as a shipbuilding engineer. After finishing his higher education, Kinakh started his engineering career at the Tallinn shipyard. From 1981 he worked at the Mykolaiv shipyard Ocean.

=== Political career ===
In April 1990, he was elected to the Ukrainian parliament the Verkhovna Rada. There he worked on a committee dealing with economic reforms. In 1992, Kinakh was appointed a representative of the President in the Mykolaiv Oblast (province) of southern Ukraine. In 1995, Anatoliy Kinakh was appointed Vice-Prime Minister of Ukraine in the Cabinet of Yevhen Marchuk concerned with industrial affairs.

In the early 1990s, Mr. Kinakh held several posts in the local government of Mykolayiv Oblast. From 1995 to 1996 Kinakh was the Minister of Industrial Policy.

Anatoliy Kinah was appointed the Prime Minister of Ukraine from 29 May 2001 to 21 November 2002.

In 2002, he was elected to Verkhovna Rada on the list of the electoral bloc of parties For United Ukraine.

In the 2004 presidential election Anatoliy Kinakh was a candidate for the post of President of Ukraine, nominated by the Party of Industrialists and Entrepreneurs of Ukraine, which he has chaired since 2000. A particular feature of his election program is a pro-Ukrainian choice in foreign policy, saying that entry to the European Union should not be a barrier to the development of relationships with all Commonwealth of Independent States countries as well as with Russia.

During the election campaign, Kinakh publicly broke ties with government-backed candidate and then Prime Minister Viktor Yanukovych by declaring that no criminal can hold the post of President of Ukraine. He later took an active part in the Orange Revolution on the side of opposition leader Viktor Yushchenko (who was elected president). Kinakh was appointed First Vice Prime Minister in the first Tymoshenko Government. Kinakh became Secretary of the National Security and Defense Council of Ukraine on 27 September 2005.

Kinakh was number two on the electoral list of the pro-presidential bloc Our Ukraine during the 2006 parliamentary election.

In March 2007, he became the Minister of Economics in the cabinet of Viktor Yanukovych against the wish of the Our Ukraine bloc. The Our Ukraine faction then decided to expel Anatoliy Kinakh from the faction and President Viktor Yushchenko ordered his removal from the National Security and Defense Council.

At the early parliamentary elections on 30 September 2007, his party participated in the elections together with the Yanukovych-led Party of Regions. Kinakh was elected in parliament. He became a full member of Party of Regions in October 2008. In 2012 he was re-elected into parliament on the party list of Party of Regions.

On 16 January 2014 he voted for the laws that conflict with the Constitution of Ukraine, Convention about the protection of human rights and fundamental freedoms, obligations and duties of Ukraine as a member of the UNO, CE and OSCE.

On 25 February 2014 Kinakh and 32 other mostly former Party of Regions deputies created the parliamentary faction Economic Development.

In the 2014 parliamentary election Kinakh tried to win a constituency seat in Mykolaiv as an independent candidate, but failed after finishing second in the constituency with approximately 12.77% of votes (winner Borys Kozyr of Petro Poroshenko Bloc won 33.17% of the votes).

Kinakh did not participate in the 2019 Ukrainian parliamentary election.

Political offices
Preceded by Viktor Yushchenko	Prime Minister of Ukraine; 2001–2002	Succeeded by Viktor Yanukovych
Preceded by Petro Poroshenko	Secretary of the National Security and Defense Council; 2005–2006	Succeeded by Volodymyr Horbulin
Party political offices
Preceded by Office created	Leader of Party of Industrialists and Entrepreneurs of Ukraine; 2000–present	Incumbent
