= 1996 in Ukraine =

- Decades: 1970s; 1980s; 1990s; 2000s; 2010s
- See also: History of Ukraine; List of years in Ukraine

Events in the year 1996 in Ukraine.

== Incumbents ==
- President: Leonid Kuchma
- Prime Minister: Yevhen Marchuk (until 28 May), Pavlo Lazarenko (starting 28 May)

=== Governors ===
- Cherkasy Oblast: Vasyl Tsybenko (Independent)
- Chernihiv Oblast: Petro Shapoval (Independent)
- Chernivtsi Oblast: Ivan Hnatyshyn (until March 31), Heorhiy Filipchuk (starting May 12) (Independent)
- Dnipropetrovsk Oblast: Mykola Derkach (until August 8), Viktor Meleshko (starting August 8) (Independent)
- Donetsk Oblast: Volodymyr Shcherban (until July 18), Serhiy Polyakov (starting July 18) (Independent)
- Ivano-Frankivsk Oblast: Stepan Volkovetsky (Independent)
- Kharkiv Oblast: Oleksandr Maselsky (until April 12), Oleh Demyn (starting May 8) (Independent)
- Kherson Oblast: Vitaliy Karaliuk (Independent)
- Khmelnytskyi Oblast: Yevhen Huselnykov (Independent)
- Kirovohrad Oblast: Mykola Sukhomlyn (until September 17), Mykhailo Hromovyi (starting September 17) (Independent)
- Kyiv Oblast: Vasyl Sinko (Independent)
- Luhansk Oblast: Petro Kupin (until October 19), Hennadiy Fomin (starting October 19) (Independent)
- Lviv Oblast: Mykola Horyn (Independent)
- Mykolaiv Oblast: Mykola Kruhlov (Independent)
- Odesa Oblast: Ruslan Bodelan (Independent)
- Poltava Oblast: Mykola Zaludyak (Independent)
- Rivne Oblast: Roman Vasylyshyn (Independent)
- Sumy Oblast: Anatoliy Epifanov (Independent)
- Ternopil Oblast: Bohdan Boyko (Independent)
- Vinnytsia Oblast: Mykola Melnyk (until June 18), Anatoliy Matviyenko (starting June 18) (Independent)
- Volyn Oblast: Borys Klimchuk (Independent)
- Zakarpattia Oblast: Serhiy Ustych (Independent)
- Zaporizhzhia Oblast: Viacheslav Pokhvalsky (Independent)
- Zhytomyr Oblast: Anton Malynovskyi (Independent)

== Events ==
- June 28 - first celebration of Constitution Day (Ukraine)

== Births ==
- February 14 - Viktor Kovalenko, footballer
- October 6 - Victoria Roshchyna, journalist (d. 2024)
- December 15 - Oleksandr Zinchenko, footballer

== Deaths ==
- January 22 - Petro Shelest, politician
- November 10 - Imam Alimsultanov, Chechen folk singer
- November 25 - Mykhailo Krechko, composer
- Hryhory Nazarenko, musician
