= 1992 in Ukraine =

- Decades: 1970s; 1980s; 1990s; 2000s; 2010s
- See also: History of Ukraine; List of years in Ukraine

Events in the year 1992 in Ukraine.

== Incumbents ==
- President: Leonid Kravchuk
- Prime Minister: Vitold Fokin (until 2 October), Valentyn Symonenko (from 2 October until 13 October), Leonid Kuchma (from 13 October)

=== Governors ===
- Cherkasy Oblast: Mykola Yukhymuk (Independent)
- Chernihiv Oblast: Valentyn Melnychuk (Independent)
- Chernivtsi Oblast: Ivan Hnatyshyn (Independent)
- Dnipropetrovsk Oblast: Pavlo Lazarenko (Independent)
- Donetsk Oblast: Yuriy Smirnov (Independent)
- Ivano-Frankivsk Oblast: Vasyl Pavlyk (Independent)
- Kharkiv Oblast: Oleksandr Maselsky (Independent)
- Kherson Oblast: Oleksandr Melnykov (Independent)
- Khmelnytskyi Oblast: Yevhen Huselnykov (Independent)
- Kirovohrad Oblast: Mykola Sukhomlyn (Independent)
- Kyiv Oblast: Ivan Kapshtyk (Independent)
- Luhansk Oblast: Eduard Khananov (Independent)
- Lviv Oblast: Stepan Davymuka (Independent / Rukh ally)
- Mykolaiv Oblast: Anatoliy Kinakh (Independent)
- Odesa Oblast: Vladlen Ilyin (Independent)
- Poltava Oblast: Mykola Zaludyak (Independent)
- Rivne Oblast: Roman Vasylyshyn (Independent)
- Sumy Oblast: Anatoliy Epifanov (Independent)
- Ternopil Oblast: Roman Hromyak (Independent / Rukh ally)
- Vinnytsia Oblast: Mykola Didyk (Independent)
- Volyn Oblast: Volodymyr Blazhenchuk (Independent)
- Zakarpattia Oblast: Mykhailo Krailo (Independent)
- Zaporizhzhia Oblast: Volodymyr Demianov (until October), Yanis Bokans (starting October) (Independent)
- Zhytomyr Oblast: Anton Malynovskyi (Independent)

== Events ==
- 28 January – The blue and yellow flag of Ukraine was officially restored by the Verkhovna Rada.
