= 1995 in Ukraine =

- Decades: 1970s; 1980s; 1990s; 2000s; 2010s
- See also: History of Ukraine; List of years in Ukraine

Events in the year 1995 in Ukraine.

== Incumbents ==
- President: Leonid Kuchma
- Prime Minister: Vitaliy Masol (until 1 March), Yevhen Marchuk (from 1 March)

=== Governors ===
- Cherkasy Oblast: Vasyl Tsybenko (Independent)
- Chernihiv Oblast: Petro Shapoval (Independent)
- Chernivtsi Oblast: Ivan Hnatyshyn (Independent)
- Dnipropetrovsk Oblast: Pavlo Lazarenko (until September), Mykola Derkach (starting September) (Independent)
- Donetsk Oblast: Volodymyr Shcherban (Independent)
- Ivano-Frankivsk Oblast: Stepan Volkovetsky (Independent)
- Kharkiv Oblast: Oleksandr Maselsky (Independent)
- Kherson Oblast: Vitaliy Horduienko (until July), Vitaliy Karaliuk (starting July) (Independent)
- Khmelnytskyi Oblast: Yevhen Huselnykov (Independent)
- Kirovohrad Oblast: Mykola Sukhomlyn (Independent)
- Kyiv Oblast: Vasyl Sinko (Independent)
- Luhansk Oblast: Petro Kupin (Independent)
- Lviv Oblast: Mykola Horyn (Independent)
- Mykolaiv Oblast: Anatoliy Kinakh (until May), Mykola Kruhlov (starting July) (Independent)
- Odesa Oblast: Ruslan Bodelan (Independent)
- Poltava Oblast: Mykola Zaludyak (Independent)
- Rivne Oblast: Roman Vasylyshyn (Independent)
- Sumy Oblast: Anatoliy Epifanov (Independent)
- Ternopil Oblast: Bohdan Boyko (Independent)
- Vinnytsia Oblast: Mykola Melnyk (Independent)
- Volyn Oblast: Borys Klimchuk (Independent)
- Zakarpattia Oblast: Serhiy Ustych (Independent)
- Zaporizhzhia Oblast: Viacheslav Pokhvalsky (Independent)
- Zhytomyr Oblast: Anton Malynovskyi (Independent)

== Events ==
- 10 February – The first Antonov An-70 prototype aircraft collided with an Antonov An-72 that was assisting with the An-70 test program over Borodianka Raion, killing all 7 crew members of the An-70.

== Deaths ==
- Dariya Nikitichna Dobroczajeva, botanist (1 December)
