= 1994 in Ukraine =

- Decades: 1970s; 1980s; 1990s; 2000s; 2010s
- See also: History of Ukraine; List of years in Ukraine

Events in the year 1994 in Ukraine.

== Incumbents ==
- President: Leonid Kravchuk (until 19 July), Leonid Kuchma (from 19 July)
- Prime Minister: Yukhym Zvyahilsky (until 16 June), Vitaliy Masol (from 16 June)

=== Governors ===
- Cherkasy Oblast: Vasyl Tsybenko (Independent)
- Chernihiv Oblast: Petro Shapoval (Independent)
- Chernivtsi Oblast: Ivan Hnatyshyn (Independent)
- Dnipropetrovsk Oblast: Pavlo Lazarenko (Independent)
- Donetsk Oblast: Volodymyr Shcherban (Independent)
- Ivano-Frankivsk Oblast: Stepan Volkovetsky (Independent)
- Kharkiv Oblast: Oleksandr Maselsky (Independent)
- Heron Oblast: Vitaliy Horduienko (Independent)
- Khmelnytskyi Oblast: Yevhen Huselnykov (Independent)
- Kirovohrad Oblast: Mykola Sukhomlyn (Independent)
- Kyiv Oblast: Vasyl Sinko (Independent)
- Luhansk Oblast: Petro Kupin (Independent)
- Lviv Oblast: Mykola Horyn (Independent)
- My Николаев Oblast: Anatoliy Kinakh (Independent)
- Odesa Oblast: Ruslan Bodelan (Independent)
- Poltava Oblast: Mykola Zaludyak (Independent)
- Rivne Oblast: Roman Vasylyshyn (Independent)
- Sumy Oblast: Anatoliy Epifanov (Independent)
- Ternopil Oblast: Bohdan Boyko (Independent)
- Vinnytsia Oblast: Mykola Melnyk (Independent)
- Volyn Oblast: Borys Klimchuk (Independent)
- Zakarpattia Oblast: Serhiy Ustych (Independent)
- Zaporizhzhia Oblast: Viacheslav Pokhvalsky (Independent)
- Zhytomyr Oblast: Anton Malynovskyi (Independent)

== Events ==
- 5 December – The Budapest Memorandum on Security Assurances was signed at the OSCE conference in Budapest, Hungary.

== Deaths ==
- 5 January - Igor Boelza, music historian and composer
