= 1997 in Ukraine =

- Decades: 1970s; 1980s; 1990s; 2000s; 2010s
- See also: History of Ukraine; List of years in Ukraine

Events in the year 1997 in Ukraine.

== Incumbents ==
- President: Leonid Kuchma
- Prime Minister: Pavlo Lazarenko (until 2 July), Vasyl Durdynets (from 2 July until 30 July), Valeriy Pustovoitenko (from 30 July)

=== Governors ===
- Cherkasy Oblast: Vasyl Tsybenko (Independent)
- Chernihiv Oblast: Petro Shapoval (Independent)
- Chernivtsi Oblast: Heorhiy Filipchuk (Independent)
- Dnipropetrovsk Oblast: Viktor Meleshko (until September 3), Oleksandr Shvets (starting September 3) (Independent)
- Donetsk Oblast: Serhiy Polyakov (until May 14), Viktor Yanukovych (starting May 14) (Independent)
- Ivano-Frankivsk Oblast: Stepan Volkovetsky (until October 23), Mykhailo Vyshyvanyuk (starting October 23) (Independent)
- Kharkiv Oblast: Oleh Demyn (Independent)
- Kherson Oblast: Vitaliy Karaliuk (until July 25), Anatoliy Kasyanenko (starting July 25) (Independent)
- Khmelnytskyi Oblast: Yevhen Huselnykov (Independent)
- Kirovohrad Oblast: Mykhailo Hromovyi (Independent)
- Kyiv Oblast: Vasyl Sinko (Independent)
- Luhansk Oblast: Hennadiy Fomin (until April 7), Mykola Shulha (Acting, April 7–September 8), Oleksandr Yefremov (starting September 8) (Independent)
- Lviv Oblast: Mykola Horyn (until February 25), Mykhailo Gladiy (starting February 25) (Independent)
- Mykolaiv Oblast: Mykola Kruhlov (Independent)
- Odesa Oblast: Ruslan Bodelan (Independent)
- Poltava Oblast: Mykola Zaludyak (Independent)
- Rivne Oblast: Roman Vasylyshyn (until February 19), Mykola Soroka (starting February 19) (Independent)
- Sumy Oblast: Anatoliy Epifanov (Independent)
- Ternopil Oblast: Bohdan Boyko (until April 20), Vasyl Kolomyichuk (starting April 20) (Independent)
- Vinnytsia Oblast: Anatoliy Matviyenko (Independent)
- Volyn Oblast: Borys Klimchuk (Independent)
- Zakarpattia Oblast: Serhiy Ustych (Independent)
- Zaporizhzhia Oblast: Viacheslav Pokhvalsky (Independent)
- Zhytomyr Oblast: Anton Malynovskyi (Independent)

== Events ==
- 28 May – The Partition Treaty on the Status and Conditions of the Black Sea Fleet was signed between Russia and Ukraine.
- Date unknown
  - Ukrainian Processing Center is founded.

== Deaths ==
- Oksana Ivanenko, children's writer and translator (17 December)
