= 1993 in Ukraine =

- Decades: 1970s; 1980s; 1990s; 2000s; 2010s
- See also: History of Ukraine; List of years in Ukraine

Events in the year 1993 in Ukraine.

== Incumbents ==
- President: Leonid Kravchuk
- Prime Minister: Leonid Kuchma (until 22 September), Yukhym Zvyahilsky (from 22 September)

=== Governors ===
- Cherkasy Oblast: Mykola Yukhymuk (Independent)
- Chernihiv Oblast: Valentyn Melnychuk (Independent)
- Chernivtsi Oblast: Ivan Hnatyshyn (Independent)
- Dnipropetrovsk Oblast: Pavlo Lazarenko (Independent)
- Donetsk Oblast: Yuriy Smirnov (until March), Oleksandr Tvaltvadze (Acting, March–September), Vitaliy Farchushniuk (starting September) (Independent)
- Ivano-Frankivsk Oblast: Vasily Pavlyk (Independent)
- Kharkiv Oblast: Oleksandr Maselsky (Independent)
- Kherson Oblast: Oleksandr Melnykov (Independent)
- Khmelnytskyi Oblast: Yevhen Huselnykov (Independent)
- Kirovohrad Oblast: Mykola Sukhomlyn (Independent)
- Kyiv Oblast: Ivan Kapshtyk (Independent)
- Luhansk Oblast: Eduard Khananov (Independent)
- Lviv Oblast: Stepan Davymuka (Independent)
- Mykolaiv Oblast: Anatoliy Kinakh (Independent)
- Odesa Oblast: Vladlen Ilyin (Independent)
- Poltava Oblast: Mykola Zaludyak (Independent)
- Rivne Oblast: Roman Vasylyshyn (Independent)
- Sumy Oblast: Anatoliy Epifanov (Independent)
- Ternopil Oblast: Roman Hromyak (Independent)
- Vinnytsia Oblast: Mykola Didyk (Independent)
- Volyn Oblast: Volodymyr Blazhenchuk (Independent)
- Zakarpattia Oblast: Mykhailo Krailo (Independent)
- Zaporizhzhia Oblast: Yanis Bokans (Independent)
- Zhytomyr Oblast: Anton Malynovskyi (Independent)

== Events ==
- 3 September – The Massandra Accords were signed between Ukraine and the Russian Federation as result of negotiations that took place in the Massandra Palace at Yalta.

== Births ==
- February 3 - Andrii Pilshchykov, fighter pilot (died 2023)
- March 2 - Mariya Yaremchuk, pop singer
- May 4 - Ruslan Malinovskyi, footballer
- May 18 - Alekseev (singer), singer and songwriter
- June 16 - Alex Len, basketball player
- September 29 - Oleg Verniaiev, artistic gymnast

== Deaths ==
- 19 February – Alexander Davydov, Ukrainian physicist
- 11 June – Mstyslav, Eastern Orthodox patriarch
- 25 October – Maria Kapnist, film actress
