= Prokopenko =

Prokopenko (Ukrainian: Прокопе́нко [prokoˈpɛnko]) or Prakapienka (Belarusian: Пракапенка) is a Ukrainian, Belarusian, and Russian surname. It may refer to:

- Aleksandr Prokopenko (1953–1989), Soviet-Belarusian footballer
- Alena Prokopenko (born 1992), Russian judoka
- Anastasia Prokopenko (born 1986), Russian badminton player
- Anastasiya Prokopenko (born 1985), Belarusian pentathlete
- Andrii Prokopenko (born 1982), Ukrainian entrepreneur and politician
- Denis Prokopenko (born 1991), Kazakhstani footballer
- Denys Prokopenko (born 1991), Ukrainian military commander
- Dmitri Prokopenko (born 1972), Russian footballer
- Gennady Prokopenko (born 1964), Soviet-Russian ski jumper
- Georgy Prokopenko (1937–2021), Soviet-Ukrainian swimmer
- Maksym Prokopenko (born 1984), Ukrainian-Azerbaijani canoer
- Pavel Prokopenko (born 1987), Russian pole vaulter
- Viktor Prokopenko (1944–2007), Soviet-Ukrainian footballer and coach
- Viktoriya Prokopenko (born 1989), Russian triple jumper
- Vladislav Prokopenko (born 2000), Kazakhstani footballer
- Yevhen Prokopenko (born 1988), Ukrainian footballer
