= Mayor of Chernihiv =

Political office in Chernihiv, Ukraine

Mayor of the City of Chernihiv
- Flag of Chernihiv City

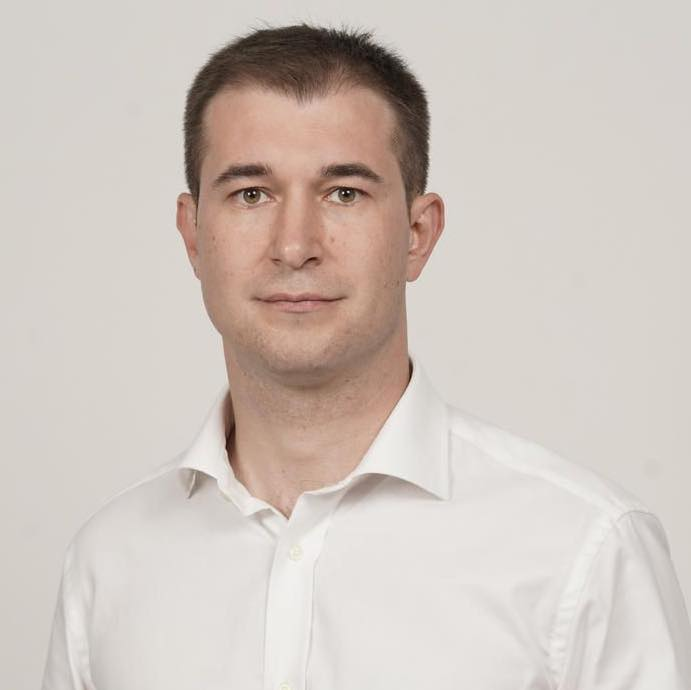
- Incumbent; Oleksandr Lomako since 1 February 2023 (acting)
- Type: City Council Chairperson
- Status: Active
- Term length: Five years
- Formation: 1943
- First holder: Ivan Silchenko
- Website: www.chernigiv-rada.gov.ua

The Mayor of Chernihiv (Ukrainian: Міський голова Чернігова, romanized: Miskyi holova Chernihova) is the head of the Chernihiv City Council, the local self-government body for the Chernihiv urban hromada, which is coextensive with the city of Chernihiv in Chernihiv Oblast, Ukraine. The current mayor is Oleksandr Lomako, who was appointed on an acting basis on 1 February 2023 after the previously incumbent elected mayor Vladyslav Atroshenko was removed from office by an order of the District Court of Yavoriv on 7 December 2022.

== List of mayors ==
Mayors of Chernihiv
Name (Note: Ukrainian names link to the Ukrainian Wikipedia articles of each mayor.)	Term
Ivan Silchenko (Іван Данилович)	1943–1944
Nikolai Sergeev (Микола Сергеєв)	1944
G.A. Savchenko (Г. А. Савченко)	1944
Mikhail Shabaydash (Михайло Шабайдаш)	1944
A.A. Kozlyanin (А.А. Козлянін)	1944–1945
G.I. Kulikov (Г.І. Куликов)	1945–1947
Miron Kushnaryov (Мирон Кушнарьов)	1947
Ivan Silchenko (Іван Сильченко)	1948–1956
Victor Dus (Віктор Дусь)	1956–1963
Vsevolod Andrievsky (Всеволод Андрієвський)	1963–1966
Stepan Mukha (Степан Муха)	1966–1970
Mykola Kramarenko (Микола Крамаренко)	1970–1973
Grigory Kudin (Григорій Кудін)	1973–1979
Stepan Baluka (Степан Балука)	1979–1984
Alexander Tavanets (Олександр Таванець)	1984–1988
Mykola Litvinov (Микола Літвінов)	1988–1990
Anatoliy Lysenko (Анатолій Лисенко)	1990
Valentyn Melnychuk (Валентин Мельничук) (Note: First mayor following the Declaration of Independence of Ukraine in 1991.)	1990–1992
Vitaliy Kosykh (Віталій Косих)	1992–2001
Oleksandr Sokolov (Олександр Соколов)	2002–2006
Mykola Rudkovsky (Микола Рудьковський)	2006
Oleksandr Sokolov (Олександр Соколов)	2006–2015
Vladyslav Atroshenko (Владислав Атрошенко)	2015–2023
Oleksandr Lomako (Олександр Ломако)	2023–present

== See also ==
- Chernihiv history
- History of Chernihiv (in Ukrainian)
