= Lokotkiv =

Lokotkiv Локотьків
- Former village
- Location within Ukraine Location within Chernihiv Oblast
- Coordinates: 51°25′38.0″N 30°50′09.9″E
- Country: Ukraine
- Oblast: Chernihiv Oblast
- Raion: Chernihiv Raion
- Established: before 1859
- Deregistered: 2001

Population (2025)
  - Total: 0
- Time zone: UTC+2 (EET)
  - Summer (DST): UTC+3 (EEST)

Lokotkiv (Ukrainian: Локотьків) is an abandoned settlement and former village located in Chernihiv Raion, Chernihiv Oblast, Ukraine, evacuated after the Chernobyl disaster. It belonged to the Pakul village council. It is located near the Pakulka River.

== History ==
In 1859, the village had 13 houses with 77 residents.

According to data from 1983, the village had a population of 150 people. As a result of the Chernobyl disaster, the village experienced significant radioactive contamination and fell within the mandatory evacuation zone. The residents were relocated to the village of Voznesenske.

On March 27, 2001, by the decision of the Chernihiv Oblast Council, the village was officially deregistered.
