= Anna Kovalenko =

Ukrainian politician, journalist, and activist

- Анна Коваленко
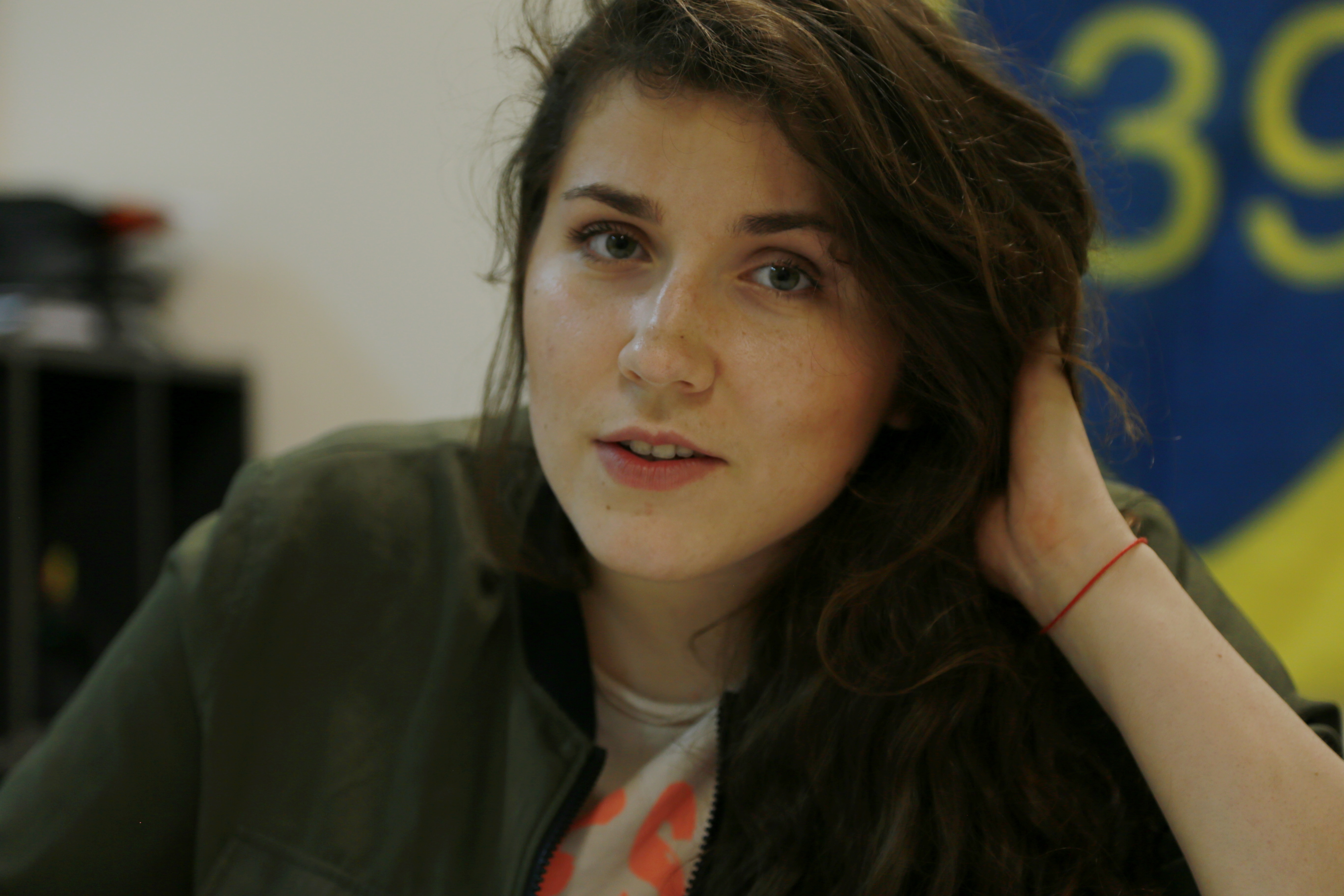

Governor of Chernihiv Oblast
- In office 13 October 2020 – 4 August 2021
- President: Volodymyr Zelenskyy
- Prime Minister: Denys Shmyhal
- Preceded by: Andrii Prokopenko
- Succeeded by: Vyacheslav Chaus

Deputy Head of the Office of the President of Ukraine
- In office 4 September 2019 – 22 April 2020

People's Deputy of Ukraine
- In office 29 August 2019 – 10 September 2019
- Constituency: Servant of the People, No. 35

Personal details
- Born: 5 May 1991 (age 35) Bucha, Ukrainian SSR, Soviet Union (now Ukraine)
- Party: Servant of the People
- Spouse: Ruslan Khomchak

Anna Mykolayivna Kovalenko (Ukrainian: Анна Миколаївна Коваленко; born 5 May 1991) is a Ukrainian political figure, activist, and journalist. Kovalenko was the Governor of Chernihiv Oblast from 13 October 2020 until 4 August 2021, and previously served as a People's Deputy of Ukraine from 29 August 2019 until her resignation on 10 September 2019. She is a member of Servant of the People.

From 4 September 2019 to 22 April 2020, Kovalenko was the Deputy Head of the Office of the President of Ukraine. She was the Deputy Minister of Community and Territory Development of Ukraine.

Kovalenko was also centurion of the 39th Maidan Women's Self-Defense Hundred, a former adviser to the three Ministers of Defense of Ukraine and Minister of Information Policy of Ukraine. She is a defense and security expert.

== Biography ==
Anna Kovalenko was born in Bucha, Kyiv Oblast on 5 May 1991.

== Education ==
From 2008 to 2013, she studied at the Kyiv National University of Theater, Film and Television named after I.K. Karpenko-Kary (Master of Theater Studies).

In 2013, she earned a master's degree in Theater Studies at Kyiv University of Cinema and Television.

Since 2017, a postgraduate student of the National Academy for Public Administration under the President of Ukraine (specialty "Public Administration"), with dissertational dosage, "Democratic civil control over development and counter-intelligence in Ukraine".

Kovalenko attended the Military Command and Humanitarian Law course at the Geneva Center for Security Policy (GCSP) in Geneva, Switzerland.

=== Journalist activity ===
Between 2008 and 2013, Kovalenko was a journalist at the Radio Era TV and Radio Company and the STB TV channel. Since 2009, she was the deputy director of Public Relations of the Antikva Publishing House.

In November 2009 until the present hour, she was the patron of the director of the connection from the community of Vidavnichy to the house "Antikvar". She was also an organizer of cultural projects in Ukraine, France and Portugal.

From July to November 2010, she worked as executive director of the Association of European Journalists. Ukrainian section.

== Political activity ==
=== Participation in the Revolution of Dignity and state reform ===
Kovalenko took part in protests on Euromaidan before the violent dispersal of students on 30 November 2013. She initially made hourly broadcasts for Radio Era, then took part in patrolling the Maidan and surrounding areas. She participated in the development of a plan to defend office buildings from the assault by security forces. She later became a deputy captain of the 11th Self-Defense Hundred. In mid-January 2014, she organized and led the 39th Maidan Women's Self-Defense Hundred. At the time of its creation, the hundred had more than 150 participants. At present, 39 hundred have been transformed into an all-Ukrainian public organization, "Women's Hundred", which has about two thousand members. Since March 2014, she was the chairman of the All-Ukrainian NGO "39th Maidan Self-Defense Hundred".

=== Political career ===
Kovalenko ran in the 2014 Ukrainian parliamentary election as a self-nominated candidate in the 206th constituency (Chernihiv) as an independent. The CEC denied Kovalenko formal registration. And this denial had to be revoked through the courts of two instances. For this reason, Kovalenko has only two weeks left to campaign. Despite this, she received 9% of the vote (second place after local oligarch Vladyslav Atroshenko).

From 2014 to 2015, Kovalenko worked as an adviser to the Minister of Defense of Ukraine and served as an adviser to the Minister of Information Policy. As an adviser to the Ministers of Defense, she set up a Center for Coordination of Operational Assistance to the Ukrainian Army, as well as a hotline (call center) for communication and coordination between checkpoints and volunteers. She organized numerous events to establish communication between the MoD staff, volunteers, the public and other government agencies. She participated in the development of reform programs of the Ministry of Defense and the organization of cooperation with NATO, the OSCE, the Canadian and Norwegian embassies.

As an adviser to the Minister of Information Policy, Kovalenko worked as a member of the commission for the restoration of television broadcasting in the anti-terrorist operation zone.

In the spring of 2015, she joined the team of the Anti-Corruption Movement, the creation of which was initiated by Valentyn Nalyvaichenko. She is one of the four coordinators of the Movement (together Nalyvaichenko, Yehor Firsov, and Serhii Nosenko). Since then, she was the coordinator of the NGO Anti-Corruption Movement of Ukraine.

Kovalenko led the project "Strategic Leadership: Security and Defense System of Ukraine" at the Kyiv-Mohyla Business School (KMBS). She worked as an expert at the George Kennan Institute, Wilson Center, in Washington, DC, United States.

Kovalenko was also a consultant to the Parliamentary Committee on Defense and Security. She was also an adviser to the Head of the State Service for Special Communications and Information Protection of Ukraine. She was a member of the club of the diplomatic representation of the NATO Liaison Office in Ukraine, "Women at the Head of Reforms". She was a member of the committee responsible for the restoration of television and radio broadcasting in the territory of the ATO.

Kovalenko was the candidate for People's Deputies from the Servant of the People party in the 2019 parliamentary elections, No. 35 on the list, as an independent, at the time of the election as she was the individual entrepreneur. She was elected as a member of parliament, but later resigned, becoming deputy head of the Office of the President of Ukraine instead.

She was member of the Verkhovna Rada (the Ukrainian parliament) Committee on Social Policy and Protection of Veterans' Rights.

As the head of the Women's Hundred NGO, she conducts public and political activities in the areas of gender and cultural policy, and is the coordinator of the Anti-Corruption Movement of Ukraine NGO.

=== Governor of Chernihiv Oblast ===
On 13 October 2020, Kovalenko was appointed Governor of Chernihiv Oblast.

On 4 August 2021 President Volodymyr Zelenskyy dismissed Kovalenko from the post after she had tendered her resignation on 28 July.

== Family ==
Kovalenko's husband, Ruslan Khomchak, is a Colonel-General who is a former Commander-in-Chief of the Armed Forces of Ukraine (March 2020 until July 2021).

In January 2021 Kovalenko gave birth to daughter Maria.
