= Kuchta =

Kuchta (Czech/Slovak feminine: Kuchtová) or Kukhta (Cyrillic: Кухта) is a Slavic surname. Notable people with the surname include:

- Anton Kukhta (born 1991), Ukrainian football striker
- Dana Kuchtová (born 1961), Czech politician
- Frank Kuchta (1936–2017), American football player
- Gladys Kuchta (1915–1998), American operatic soprano
- Jan Kuchta (born 1997), Czech football player
- Oleg Kukhta (born 1970), Russian singer-songwriter and actor
- Pavlo Kukhta (born 1985), Ukrainian economist and politician
- Tatsiana Kukhta (born 1990), Belarusian rower
- Zygfryd Kuchta (born 1944), Polish handball player
