= Mykhaylo Pylypchuk =

Ukrainian politician

- Михайло Пилипчук

Member of the Kharkiv Oblast Council
- In office 21 March 2002 – 25 October 2020

2nd Mayor of Kharkiv
- In office 20 December 1996 – 21 March 2002
- Preceded by: Yevhen Kushnaryov
- Succeeded by: Volodymyr Shumilkin

Personal details
- Born: 25 October 1946 (age 80) Koziatyn, Vinnytsia Oblast, Ukrainian SSR, Soviet Union
- Party: Revival

Mykhaylo Dmytrovych Pylypchuk (Ukrainian: Михайло Дмитрович Пилипчук; born 25 October 1945) is a Ukrainian politician who had served as the 2nd mayor of Kharkiv from 1996 to 2002.

From 2002 to 2020, he was a member of the Kharkiv Oblast Council, and a member of the Revival Party. He is known to be the liquidator of the Chernobyl accident.

He is an honored Builder of Ukraine, and was the awarded the State Order of Ukraine "For Merit" II and III degree, as well as the Commander's Cross for Merit of Poland.

He is a chairman of the International Boris Chichibabin Memorial Foundation.

He is an honorary citizen of Kharkiv in 2007.

== Biography ==
Mykhaylo Pylypchuk was born on 25 October 1946.

Pylypchuk received his higher education, graduating from the Kiev Polytechnic Institute in 1969.

By distribution, he was sent to the Kharkov Tractor Engine Plant. He changed several positions at the plant: heat power engineer, secretary of the Komsomol committee, deputy head of the electrical repair shop, deputy secretary of the plant's party committee and secretary of the plant's party committee.

In 1982, Pylypchuk left the factory to engage in political activities. He was elected a people's deputy of the Frunzensky district of the city of Kharkov, where between 1982 and 1988, he served as second secretary of the Frunzensky district committee of the Communist Party of Ukraine. In 1986, he took part in measures to eliminate the consequences of the accident at the Chernobyl nuclear power plant. In 1988, he has repeatedly become a deputy of the Kharkov City Council, where he holds the following positions: deputy chairman of the city executive committee, chairman of the city executive committee, deputy chairman of the city council and secretary of the city council.

=== Mayor of Kharkiv ===
On 20 December 1996, Pylypchuk served as the mayor of Kharkiv for two years. In 1998, he won the election of the mayor, and officially took office. He held the position of mayor until 2002, when Volodymyr Shumilkin won the next election.

According to nationwide polls in 1999, Pylypchuk was widely considered as the best mayors of Kharkiv.

== Political activities ==
For participation in the launch of the Alekseevska metro line, Pilipchuk was awarded the title of Honored Builder of Ukraine.

In 2002, he was appointed head of the Kharkiv Metro. From 2002 to 2004, he became the repeated winner of the annual All-Ukrainian competition "The Best Employer of the Year".

In 2004 he joined the Revival party.

On 26 March 2006, he was elected a member to the Kharkiv Oblast Council, where he became a member of the budget committee.

In April 2006, he has been the first deputy head of the subway. Pylypchuk was awarded the title of "Honorary Worker of the Kharkiv Metro", and he was also awarded the badge of the Ministry of Transport and Communications of Ukraine "Honorary Worker of Transport of Ukraine".

That same year, he was awarded the honorary badge of the Kharkiv Regional Council "Slobozhanska Glory", as well as the Certificate of Honor of the Chairman of the Kharkiv Regional State Administration.

In 2007, he was awarded the title of Honorary Citizen of Kharkiv.

By the decision of the session of the Kharkiv City Council dated 29 April 2010, he was included in the executive committee of the Kharkiv City Council.

== Personal life ==
He lives in Kharkiv.
