= 1991 in Ukraine =

- Decades: 1970s; 1980s; 1990s; 2000s; 2010s
- See also: History of Ukraine; List of years in Ukraine

Events in the year 1991 in Ukraine.

== Incumbents ==
- President: Leonid Kravchuk
- Prime Minister: Vitold Fokin

== Events ==
- August 24 – The country declares its independence from the Soviet Union.
- October 6 – Soviet President Gorbachev condemns antisemitism in the Soviet Union in a statement read on the 50th anniversary of the Babi Yar massacres, which saw the death of 35,000 Jews in the country during WWII.
- December 1 – The 1991 Transcarpathian general regional referendum is held. The vast majority of those who participated in the referendums voted for the "Independence of Ukraine" (90.13%) and the accession of Transcarpathia to Ukraine with the status of a "Special self-governing territory" (78%).
- December 8 – In the Białowieża Forest Nature Reserve in Belarus, the leaders of Russia, Belarus, and Ukraine sign an agreement officially ending the Soviet Union and establishing the Commonwealth of Independent States (CIS) in its place.
- December 12 – Ukraine becomes the first post-Soviet republic to decriminalize homosexuality.

== Births ==
- 29 June – Anton Kukhta, Ukrainian footballer
- 31 December – Oleksandr Piskunov, Ukrainian actor
