= Vyacheslav Chaus =

Ukrainian politician

- В'ячеслав Чаус
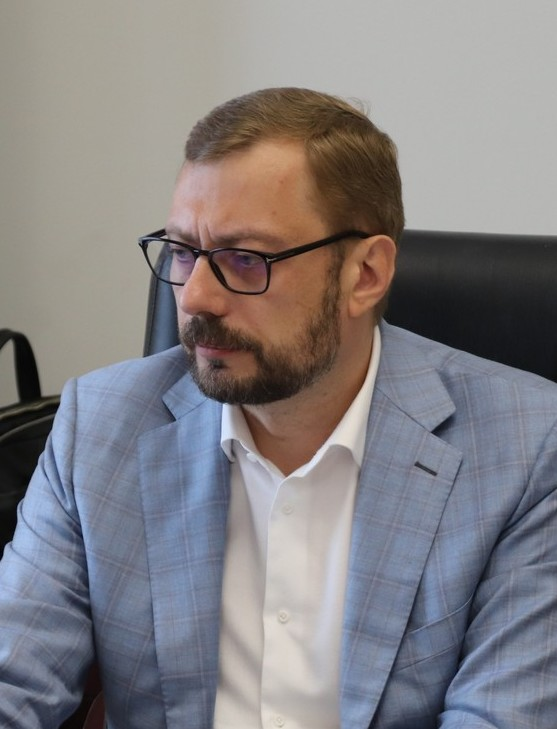
- Chaus in 2021

Governor of Chernihiv Oblast
- Incumbent
- Assumed office 4 August 2021
- President: Volodymyr Zelenskyy
- Prime Minister: Denys Shmyhal; Yulia Svyrydenko; Serhii Koretskyi
- Preceded by: Anna Kovalenko

Personal details
- Born: 28 August 1977 (age 49) Chernihiv, Chernihiv Oblast, Ukrainian SSR, Soviet Union
- Party: Servant of the People

Vyacheslav Anatoliyovych Chaus (Ukrainian: В'ячеслав Анатолійович Чаус; born 28 August 1977) is a Ukrainian politician who is currently the governor of Chernihiv Oblast since 4 August 2021.

== Biography ==
Chaus was born in Chernihiv on 28 August 1977.

In 1995, he graduated from the Chernihiv State Institute of Law, Social Technologies and Labor, and the National University "Chernihiv Polytechnic" in 1999.

From 1999 to 2000, he worked in the Chernihiv District State Administration. From 2000 to 2006, he was in the Chernihiv territorial branch of the Antimonopoly Committee of Ukraine. He later managed the Chernihiv branches of financial companies. From 2009 to 2015, he headed the Chernihiv representative office of PJSC Kyivstar, headed the sales departments of PJSC Kyivstar and PJSC Ukrtelecom. From 2015 to 2021 he worked for UkrGazVydobuvannya. He was the director and deputy general director of the company for land and social issues. In addition, he was a member of the company's board for 4 years. He has a law and economic education.

On 4 August 2021, by Order of the President of Ukraine No. 343/2021, Chaus was appointed head of the Governor of Chernihiv Oblast. On 5 August, he held a press conference outlining the most important priorities.
