= Andrii Prokopenko =

Ukrainian politician

Andrii Prokopenko Андрій Прокопенко
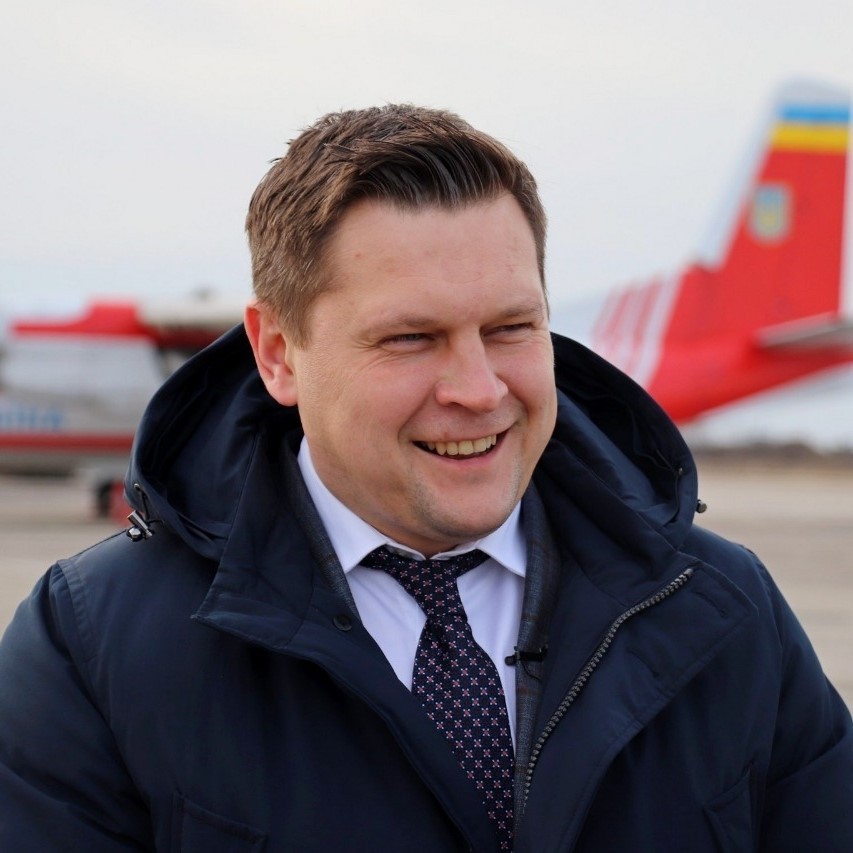

Governor of Chernihiv Oblast
- In office 1 November 2019 – 12 September 2020
- President: Volodymyr Zelenskyy
- Prime Minister: Oleksiy Honcharuk; Denys Shmygal
- Preceded by: Nataliia Romanova (Acting)
- Succeeded by: Anna Kovalenko

Personal details
- Born: Andrii Leonidovych Prokopenko; 10 January 1982 (age 44) Kyiv, Ukrainian SSR, USSR
- Party: Our Land; Servant of the People
- Education: University of Kyiv
- Occupation: entrepreneur politician
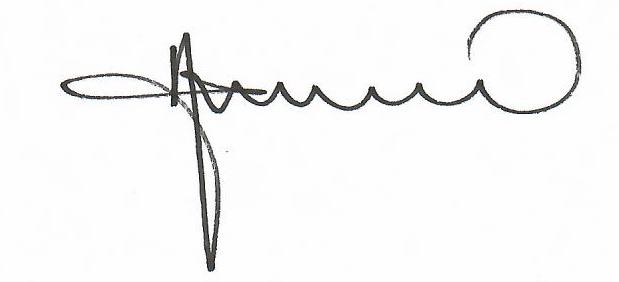
- Signature

Andrii Leonidovych Prokopenko (Ukrainian: Андрій Леонідович Прокопенко; born 10 January 1982) is a Ukrainian entrepreneur and politician. Prokopenko is a former Governor of Chernihiv Oblast.

== Biography ==
In 2003, he graduated from Taras Shevchenko National University of Kyiv.

Prokopenko is a Candidate of Sciences in Social philosophy.

Former Deputy director of NGO “Youth Alternative” and Executive director of the NGO "Institute of Social Development".

In 2012-2013, he worked as an Adviser to the Vice president and headed the Communications department of the major vertically-integrated oil company - TNK-BP. Until in 2013 TNK-BP was acquired by Russian oil company Rosneft.

He was a managing partner of Prokopenko & Partners, specializing in Election campaign management, strategic and crisis communications.

== Early political career ==
In 2015 Prokopenko was elected as a member of the Chernihiv Oblast Council for the party Our Land. He headed the Permanent Commission of the Chernihiv Oblast Council on issues of Public utility, Transport and Infrastructure. During his work, he managed to fulfill his pre-election promise and ensured the adoption of the Regional Energy Efficiency Program by the Chernihiv Oblast Council, which reimbursed to population costs of loans received for energy saving, and aimed to increase the Energy independence of Ukraine and reduce the consumption of russian natural gas.

In the 2019 Ukrainian parliamentary election Prokopenko was the head of the Odesa regional headquarters of the party Servant of the People

== Governor of Chernihiv Oblast ==
Prokopenko was Governor of Chernihiv Oblast from 1 November 2019 until 13 October 2020.

According to International Centre for Policy Studies research Andrii Prokopenko was one of the Top-3 best Ukrainian governors together with Vladyslav Skalsky and Denys Shmyhal.

According to Ministry of Communities and Territories Development (Ukraine), during the tenure of governor Andrii Prokopenko, Chernihiv region raised from 15th to 9th place among the regions of Ukraine in the ranking of socio-economic development of Ukraine's regions.

In 2020 Chernihiv region was in Top-3 regions in terms of implementation of the Decentralisation in Ukraine reform and local self-government reform.

During Prokopenko's leadership, Chernihiv Oblast entered the Top-5 among regions in terms of the pace of implementation of the program of the President of Ukraine Volodymyr Zelenskyy "The Big Construction".

Under the supervision of Andrii Prokopenko, in 2020, for the first time since 2012, a newly built school was opened in Chernihiv Oblast. A new school was opened in Nosivka, the city where U.S. Representative Victoria Spartz was born. The new school, with an area of 4,870 square meters, fully meets the requirements of the "New Ukrainian School" concept: it is designed for 520 school students and equipped with a professional teaching staff. In total, the school has 25 modern classrooms, 2 woodworking and metalworking workshops, a library, sports and assembly halls, a comfortable dining hall and a sports ground with an artificial surface. In addition, the project envisages the school's heat supply from a solid fuel and gas boiler houses. The cost of the project was 57.42 million hryvnas (approx. 2.2 million USD).

Prokopenko paid special attention to the economic development of the Chernihiv Oblast during his tenure. One of the priorities was the development of agriculture in the region. According to the results of 2020, a record harvest of grain was collected in the Chernihiv region - more than 5 million tons. Grain and leguminous agricultural crops were grown on an area of almost 800,000 hectares. The average yield was 6.3 t/ha, and the yield of corn, in particular, was 7.48 t/ha. Chernihiv Oblast has become one of the top 3 best regions of Ukraine for milk production - farms of the Chernihiv region produced 245,000 tons of milk per year, of which 51% was extra grade milk that meets the European Union high-quality standards. Another direction for economic growth was the development of industry and industrial parks, in particular, the creation of the first industrial park in the Chernihiv region in the city of Mena.

As governor, Andrii Prokopenko contributed to the equipping of modern weapons to the Armed Forces of Ukraine, in particular the improvement of Ukrainian-made weapons.

Prokopenko initiated the inclusion of the Chernihiv historical landscape in the UNESCO World Heritage. In particular, it includes unique monuments of architecture and archeology. Among them is one of the oldest preserved monumental stone buildings of Ukraine, the main building of the Principality of Chernigov - Transfiguration Cathedral, Chernihiv commissioned in the early 1030s by Mstislav of Chernigov and completed several decades later by his brother, Yaroslav the Wise.

== Local government advocacy ==
In 2021 Andrii Prokopenko was elected Deputy Executive Director of Association of Amalgamated Territorial Communities that represents and advocates local government in Ukraine.

== Volunteer work ==
Since beginning 2022 Russian invasion of Ukraine joined as volunteer to Pirogov First Volunteer Mobile Hospital (PFVMH), which provides emergency medical care to wounded soldiers and civilians in the war zone.
