= Oleh Shapovalov =

Ukrainian politician (1963–2021)

President of the Kharkiv Oblast Council
- In office 15 February 2005 – 28 April 2006
- Preceded by: Yevhen Kushnaryov
- Succeeded by: Vasiliy Salyhin

Personal details
- Born: 16 February 1963 Izium, Ukrainian SSR, Soviet Union
- Died: 6 August 2021 (aged 58)
- Party: Party of Regions

Oleh Volodymyrovych Shapovalov (Ukrainian: Олег Володимирович Шаповалов; 16 February 1963 – 6 August 2021) was a Ukrainian politician. A member of the Party of Regions, he served as President of the Kharkiv Oblast Council from 2005 to 2006.

== Biography ==
Shapovalov was born on 16 February 1963, in Izium. In 1986, he graduated from the Kharkiv Petro Vasylenko National Technical University of Agriculture with a degree in mechanical engineering. In 1988, he began working for Komsomol as the group's first secretary in Izium. In 1996, he earned a degree in finance from the National University of Kharkiv. In July 1997, he started working for the Kharkiv Regional State Administration before directing a gas complex in Bezliudivka.

On 15 February 2005, Shapovalov was elected President of the Kharkiv Oblast Council, serving until 28 April 2006. On 26 March 2006, he was elected as a deputy in the Council. In July 2006, he was appointed Deputy Chairman of the Kharkiv Regional State Administration. He was dismissed in January 2009 and became general director of an electric plant in Kharkiv. On 31 October 2010, he was re-elected to the Kharkiv Oblast Council and served as Chairman of the Standing Committee on Fuel and Energy, Housing and Communal Services, Industry, Construction, Transport, Roads and Communications.

Oleg Shapovalov died on 6 August 2021, at the age of 58.

== Distinctions ==
- Knight of the Order of Merit (2003)
- Medal of the Verkhovna Rada (2005)
- Honorary Award of the Kharkiv Oblast Council (2009)
- President of the Kharkiv Regional Parachute Federation
- President of the Parachute Sports Federation of Ukraine
