= Volodymyr Tyahlo =

Ukrainian politician (1947–2021)

Chairman of the Kharkiv Oblast Council
- In office July 1996 – February 2002
- Preceded by: Oleksandr Maselsky
- Succeeded by: Oleksiy Koliesnik
- In office April 1992 – June 1994
- Preceded by: Oleksandr Maselsky
- Succeeded by: Oleksandr Maselsky

Personal details
- Born: 24 June 1947 Katerinivka, Lozova Raion, Kharkiv Oblast, Ukrainian SSR, Soviet Union
- Died: 3 July 2021 (aged 74) Kharkiv, Ukraine
- Party: CPSU (1970–1991); Independent (1991–2021)

Volodymyr Mykolayovych Tyahlo (Ukrainian: Володимир Миколайович Тягло; 24 June 1947 – 3 July 2021) was a Ukrainian politician.

== Biography ==
Tyahlo was born in 1947 in the village of Katerinivka in the Lozova Raion. In 1970, he graduated from the Kharkiv Petro Vasylenko National Technical University of Agriculture. That year, he became an assistant foreman on a tractor crew, but subsequently became chief engineer on a collective farm in the Lozova Raion. He was head of the farm from 1981 to 1986.

As a member of the Communist Party of the Soviet Union (CPSU), Tyahlo served in the party's 20th Congress of the Lozova Raion. In 1986, he was elected Second Secretary of the Communist Party in Lozova and represented the city on the party's executive committee from 1987 to 1990. In March 1990, he was elected to serve on the Kharkiv Oblast Council. On 21 April 1992, he was elected to serve as the council's Chairman. He was then Deputy Head of the Kharkiv Regional State Administration from 2 November 1995 to 27 March 1997. However, he returned to the Kharkiv Oblast Council in 1998, once again serving as Chairman until February 2002.

On 2 February 2002, Tyahlo was appointed Ambassador of Ukraine to Armenia by President Leonid Kuchma. He was relieved of his duties on 21 June 2005. From August 2005 to January 2008, he was Ambassador of Ukraine to Kyrgyzstan.

Volodymyr Tyahlo died in Kharkiv on 3 July 2021 at the age of 74.

== Awards ==
- Order of the Badge of Honour
- Order of Merit of Ukraine
- Honorary Diploma of the Cabinet of Ministers of Ukraine (2001)
