= Yevhen Kushnaryov =

Ukrainian politician (1951–2007)

- Євген Кушнарьов
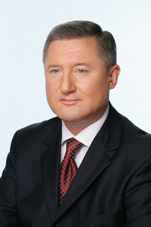
- Kushnaryov in 2006

People's Deputy of Ukraine
- In office 25 May 2006 – 17 January 2007
- In office 15 May 1990 – 10 May 1994

Chairman of the Kharkiv Oblast Council
- In office 26 November 2004 – 27 January 2005
- Preceded by: Oleksiy Kolesnyk
- Succeeded by: Oleh Shapovalov

3rd Governor of Kharkiv Oblast
- In office 27 October 2000 – 17 December 2004
- Preceded by: Oleh Dyomin
- Succeeded by: Stepan Maselsky

Head of the Presidential Administration
- In office 20 December 1996 – 23 November 1998
- Preceded by: Dmytro Tabachnyk
- Succeeded by: Mykola Biloblotskyi

1st Mayor of Kharkiv
- In office 15 May 1990 – April 1996
- Succeeded by: Mykhaylo Pylypchuk

Personal details
- Born: 29 January 1951 Kharkiv, Ukrainian SSR, Soviet Union
- Died: 17 January 2007 (aged 55) Izium, Ukraine
- Party: Party of Regions
- Other political affiliations: CPSU; NDP; New Democracy
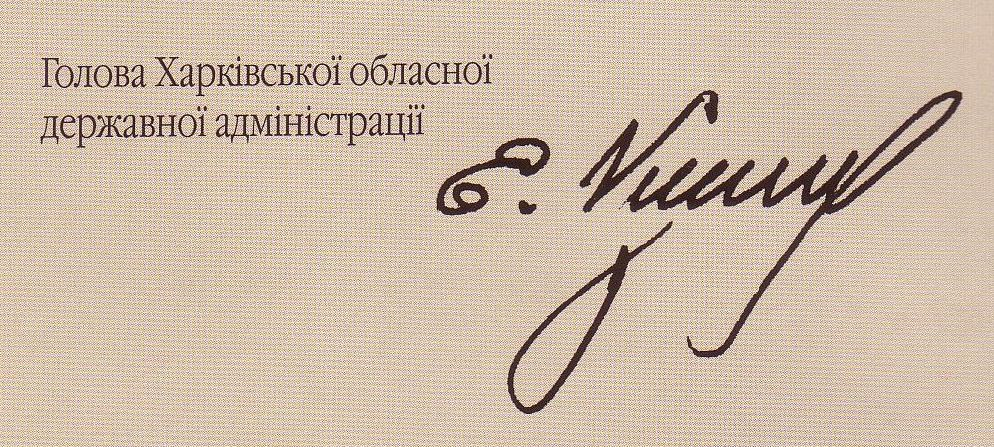
- Signature

Yevhen Petrovych Kushnaryov (Ukrainian: Євген Петрович Кушнарьов; 29 January 1951 – 17 January 2007) was a Ukrainian politician. Kushnaryov was considered one of the chief ideologues of the Party of Regions and a key ally of Prime Minister Viktor Yanukovych.

== Early life ==
Yevhen Kushnaryov was born in Kharkiv to migrants from Russia in 29 January 1951. Soon after his birth, the family moved to Melitopol. Since 1958, he studied at eight-year school No. 6, and then at secondary school No. 5, from which he graduated in 1968. Kushnaryov entered the Odessa Institute of Civil Engineering, but after the first year, by decision of his father, he transferred to the Kharkov Institute of Civil Engineering, which he graduated in 1973, receiving a degree in mechanical engineering.

== Political career ==
Kushnaryov became a member of the Communist Party of the Soviet Union in 1981. In 1989, during the Glasnost era, he joined the pro-democracy movement in the Ukrainian SSR. In 1990 Kushnaryov was elected to both the Kharkiv City Council and the Verkhovna Rada, where he took part in formulating the fledgling country's constitution, and in 1994 he became mayor of the city of Kharkiv.

Afterwards, Kushnaryov served as Leonid Kuchma's chief of staff from 1996 to 1998, and as governor of the Kharkiv Oblast from 2000 to 2004.

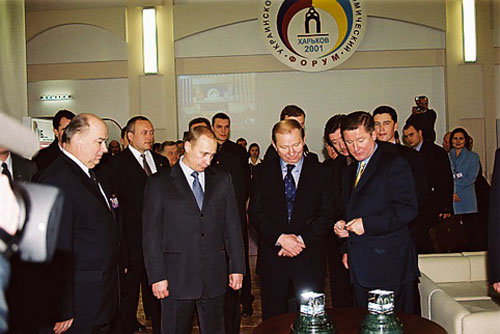
In the first row, from left to right: Vasily Tatsiy, Vladimir Putin, Leonid Kuchma and Yevhen Kushnaryov. Economic Forum December 14, 2001

In mid-December 2001, under the leadership of Kushnaryov, a Ukrainian-Russian economic business forum was organized in Kharkiv with the participation of Ukrainian President Leonid Kuchma and Russian President Vladimir Putin. At the same time, Kharkiv was proclaimed "the capital of Russian-Ukrainian relations." On 7 November 2003, Yevhen Kushnaryov, signed an agreement with the Governor of the Belgorod Oblast, Yevgeny Savchenko, on the creation of the Euroregion "Slobozhanshchina". Within the Euroregion, relations between areas in many humanitarian and financial sectors have developed. In 2004, the Euroregion "Slobozhanshchina" was included in the Association of European Border Regions as an observer.

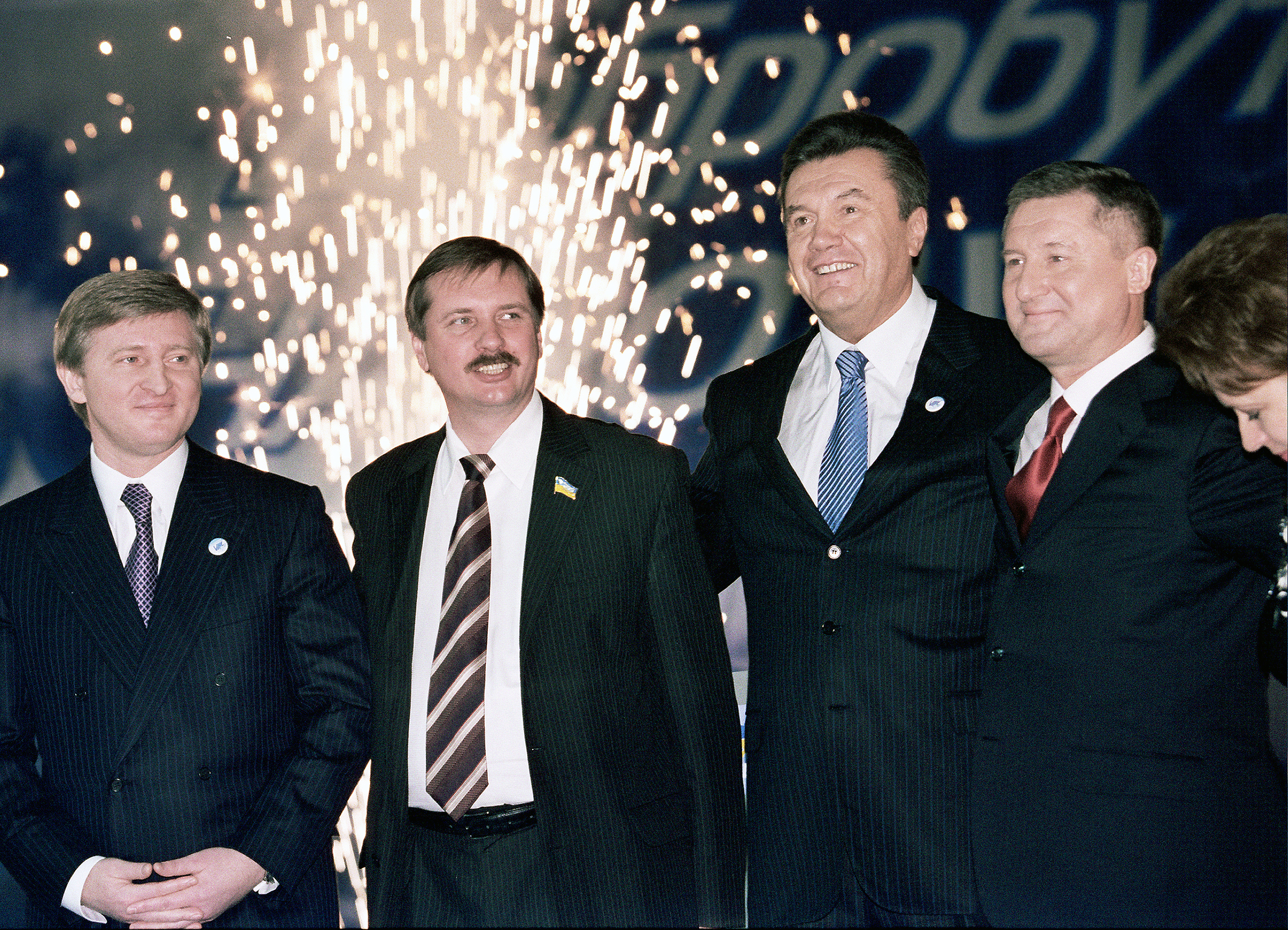
From left to right: Rinat Akhmetov, Taras Chornovil, Viktor Yanukovych and Yevhen Kushnaryov

During the Orange Revolution, Kushnaryov agitated for the creation of an independent southeastern Ukrainian state in the case of Viktor Yushchenko's victory. This caused him to be arrested on charges of separatism, that were eventually dropped. Following the Orange Revolution, Kushnaryov joined Viktor Yanukovych's Party of Regions and in 2006 he was elected to the Verkhovna Rada on the Party of Regions ticket.

Kushnaryov quickly became one of the leaders of the party along with Yanukovych and Rinat Akhmetov. Considered by many to be among the party's main ideologues, Kushnaryov could be frequently seen on television debating public policy. In 2005 he published a book (Red Horse: Notes of a Counterrevolutionary) denouncing the Orange Revolution.

== Death and remembrance ==
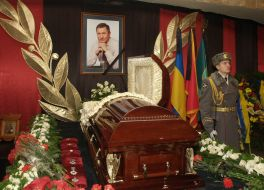
Farewell to Yevhen Kushnaryov at Kharkiv National Academic Opera and Ballet Theatre. January 19, 2007

On 15 January 2007, Kushnaryov was accidentally shot in the liver while hunting with a group of friends and colleagues, and died two days later in a hospital in Izium. A two-day period of mourning was declared in Kharkiv over the death of the former governor. Yevhen Kushnaryov was survived by his wife, two children, and two grandchildren. In October 2008 a monument to honour Kushnaryov was unveiled in Kharkiv. The Yevgeny Kushnaryov Foundation for Democracy Initiatives Support was founded in October 2007. The goal of the organisation is "to pursue with the ideas that mattered to him".

== Honors and Distinctions ==
- Order of Prince Yaroslav the Wise V (1998), IV (2002), III (2004) Class (Ukraine)
- Légion d'honneur (1997) (France)

== Trivia ==
- Although his Ukrainian name was Yevhen (Євген), Kushnaryov personally preferred to use the Russified form Yevheniy (Євгеній) when writing in Ukrainian.

== See also ==
- List of mayors of Kharkiv
- List of members of the Verkhovna Rada of Ukraine who died in office

Political offices
Preceded by Dmytro Tabachnyk	Head of the Presidential Administration; 1996-1998	Succeeded by Mykola Biloblotsky
Preceded by Oleh Dyomin	Governor of Kharkiv Oblast; 2000-2004	Succeeded by Stepan Maselsky
