= Nataliia Romanova =

Ukrainian politician (1960–2020)

- Наталія Романова

Governor of Chernihiv Oblast (acting)
- In office 11 June 2019 – 31 October 2019
- President: Volodymyr Zelenskyy
- Prime Minister: Volodymyr Groysman; Oleksiy Honcharuk
- Preceded by: Oleksandr Mynsynk
- Succeeded by: Andrii Prokopenko

Chairman of the Chernihiv Oblast Council
- In office 28 April 2006 – 19 November 2019
- Preceded by: Vasyl Kovalyov
- Succeeded by: Anatoliy Melnyk

Personal details
- Born: Nataliia Andriivna Romanova; 18 November 1960 Budapest, Hungary
- Died: 5 November 2020 (aged 59) Ukraine
- Party: Ukraine - Forward!

Nataliia Andriivna Romanova (Ukrainian: Наталія Андріївна Романова; 18 November 1960 – 5 November 2020) was a Ukrainian politician who served as the acting Governor of Chernihiv Oblast in 2019. She was formerly the chairman of the Chernihiv Oblast Council from 2006 to 2010. She died on 5 November 2020.

== Biography ==
Nataliia Romanova was born in Budapest on 18 November 1960 to a military family. Romanova's mother Nataliia, is a foreign language teacher, and her father, Andrii, is a staff officer.

In 1978, she graduated from high school № 3 in Chernihiv.

From 1978 to 1983, she studied at the Faculty of History and Law of the Chernihiv State Pedagogical Institute (now a university), received a higher education in "Teacher of History and Soviet Law".

From 1983 to 1996, she worked as a teacher of history and law at a secondary school in Chernihiv. In 1998, she started working as the deputy director of the Collegium № 11 of Chernihiv, she was a member of the Commission of the City Department of Education and Science. Introduced a number of author's programs, initiated the creation of specialized law classes.

From 2001 to 2006, she worked as an assistant-consultant to the People's Deputy of Ukraine, chairman of the Verkhovna Rada Committee on Legal Policy Vasyl Onopenko, and was actively involved in politics. Since 1999, she was a member of the board of the Ukrainian Social Democratic Party (USDP), chairman of the Chernihiv Regional Party Organization USDP.

Since 2002, she has been engaged in human rights activities, was elected honorary chairman of the Chernihiv Public Committee for Human Rights Protection, was the leader and expert of a number of human rights projects, is a co-author of the national report "Human Rights in Ukraine". From 2003 to 2006, she was the head of the free legal office in Ukraine of the International Helsinki Federation for Human Rights.

Since 2006, she studied at the National Academy of Public Administration under the president of Ukraine at the Faculty of Senior Management.

Since 2006, Romanova has been a member of the Permanent Delegation of Ukraine to the House of Congress of Local and Regional Authorities of the Council of Europe. She was elected vice-president of the CLRAE three times, and from 2012 to 2014, she was president of the Chamber of Regions of the CLRAE.

From 28 April 2006 to 19 November 2010, Romanova was the chairman of the Chernihiv Oblast Council.

In 2008, she graduated with honors from the National University Odesa Law Academy with a degree in civil and commercial justice. Master of Laws.

Since 2012, she had been a director of the School of Senior Civil Service.

According to the order of the head of the regional state administration dated 3 March 2016 №. 137-k (with changes and additions to the order of the head of the regional state administration dated 12 December 2017 G. 443-k), Natalia Romanova was appointed Deputy Governor of Chernihiv Oblast.

From 11 June to 31 October 2019, Romanova was the acting governor of Chernihiv Oblast.

=== Death ===
Nataliia Andriivna Romanova died on 5 November 2020.

== Family ==
Romanova's daughter-in-law Anna, is a former MP from Samopomoch.
