= Oleksandr Lomako =

Ukrainian politician

Lomako Oleksandr
- Олександр Ломако
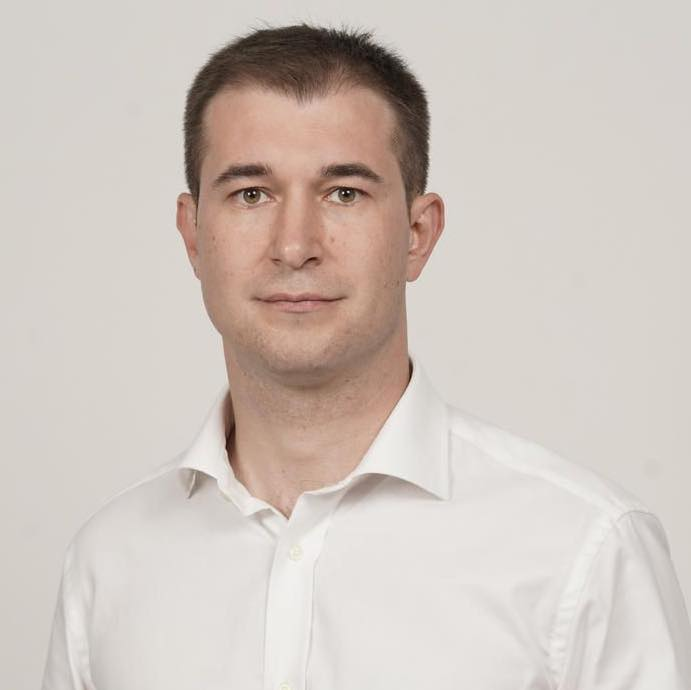

Deputy mayor of Chernihiv
- In office 2015–2020

Secretary of the Chernihiv City Council
- In office 20 November 2020 – 20 December 2024

Acting Mayor of Chernihiv
- In office 9 February 2023 – 20 December 2024
- Preceded by: Vladyslav Atroshenko

Personal details
- Party: Ukrainian Democratic; Alliance for Reform
- Education: Chernihiv Collegium National University named after T. G. Shevchenko, Ukrainian School of Political Studies

Oleksandr Anatoliiovych Lomako (Ukrainian: Олекса́ндр Анато́лійович Лома́ко; born 27 November 1984) is a Ukrainian politician. He was a secretary of the Chernihiv City Council of the 8th convocation and served as an acting mayor of Chernihiv from 1 February 2023 until 20 December 2024. Lomako is the leader of the UDAR party in Chernihiv Oblast.

== Political career ==
=== Secretary of the Chernihiv city council (2020-2023) ===
In the local elections of 2020, the "Native House" party showed one of the highest results in Ukraine, and the mayor Atroshenko was re-elected with the third result in Ukraine among city mayors. On 31 July 2021, the Homeland Party and UDAR parties signed a Memorandum of Cooperation and joint participation in the next parliamentary elections in Chernihiv. On November 3, 2021, Oleksandr Lomako headed the regional organization of the UDAR Vitaliy Klitschka party in Chernihiv Oblast.

=== Mayor of Chernihiv (2023-2024) ===
From 1 February 2023 to 20 December 2024 Lomako was the acting mayor of Chernihiv.

== Investigations ==
In September 2023, the SBU searched Lomako's home. The basis for the search was the decision of the Kyiv Court. In September 2024, repeated searches were conducted as part of the case of illegal land allocation.

In January 2025, Lomako was detained by law enforcement agencies in Chernihiv and taken to an unknown destination. His associate from the UDAR party, Artur Palatnyi, considered it political repressions.
