= Vladyslav Atroshenko =

Ukrainian politician

- Владислав Атрошенко
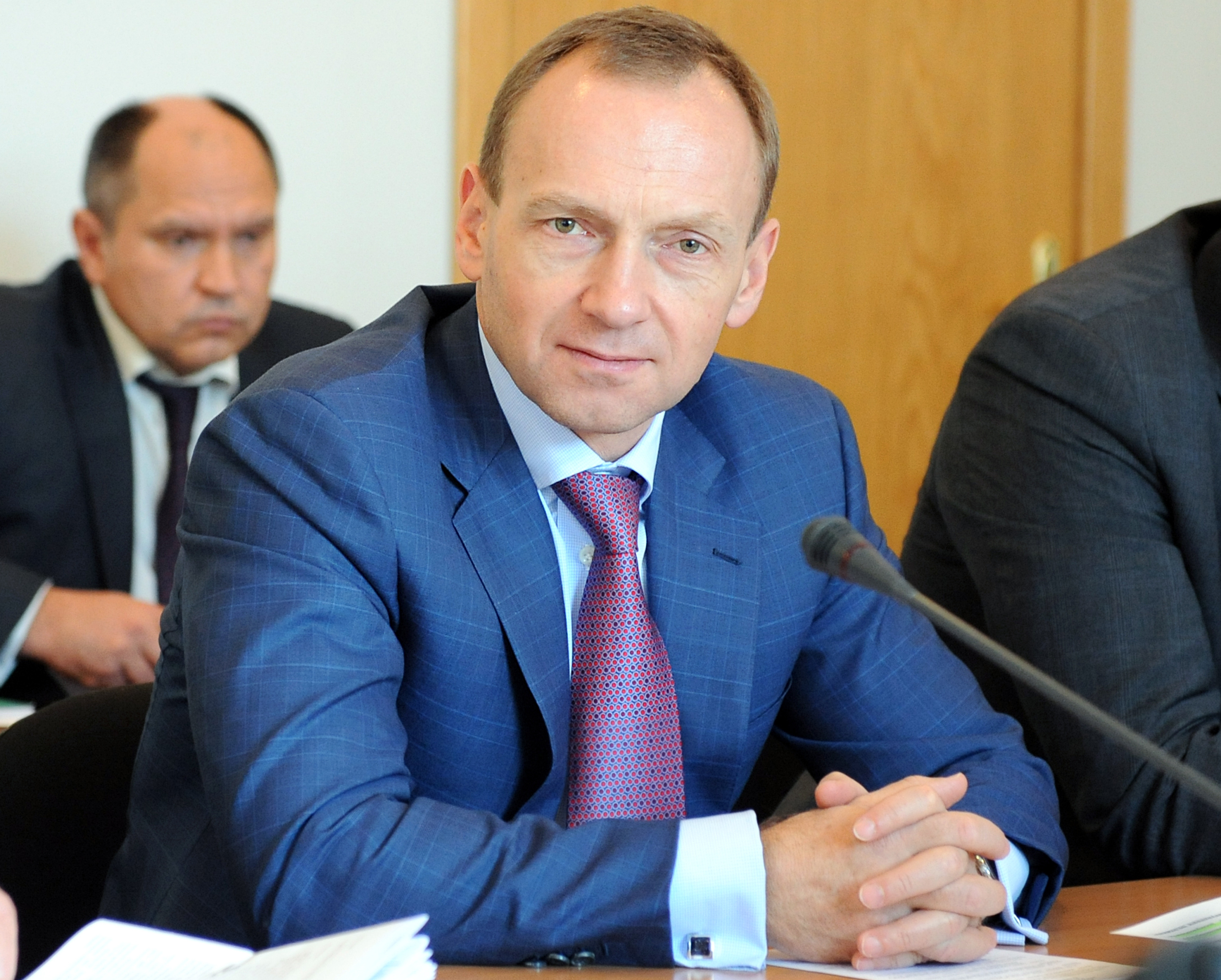

Mayor of Chernihiv Chairman of the Chernihiv City Council
- In office December 4, 2015 – February 1, 2023
- Preceded by: Oleksandr Sokolov
- Succeeded by: Oleksandr Lomako (Acting)

Governor of Chernihiv Oblast
- In office February 4, 2005 – December 12, 2005
- President: Viktor Yushchenko
- Prime Minister: Yulia Tymoshenko; Yuriy Yekhanurov
- Preceded by: Valentyn Melnychuk
- Succeeded by: Mykola Lavryk

Personal details
- Born: Владислав Анатолійович Атрошенко; 5 December 1968 (age 57) Chernihiv, Chernihiv Oblast, Ukrainian SSR, USSR
- Party: Our Ukraine Bloc; Native Home
- Children: 2
- Education: Kharkiv Aviation Institute; National Academy for Public Administration
- Awards: Order of Merit (Ukraine); Order for Courage; Honorary Citizens of Chernihiv

Vladyslav Anatoliyovych Atroshenko (Ukrainian: Владислав Анатолійович Атрошенко; born 5 December 1968) is a Ukrainian politician who was the mayor of Chernihiv from 2015 to 2023. On 7 December 2022, the Yavoriv District Court removed Atroshenko as Chernihiv mayor over allegations that at the beginning of the Russia-Ukraine war, he took his family away from areas being shelled in an official car.

In the 2015 Ukrainian local elections, Atroshenko was elected mayor of Chernihiv for the Petro Poroshenko Bloc "Solidarity". In the 2020 Ukrainian local elections, he was re-elected as mayor, representing the Native Home party.

Atroshenko is a former Ukrainian MP serving from 2002 to January 2016. He also served as Governor of Chernihiv Oblast from February to December 2015.

== Biography ==
In the 2002 Ukrainian parliamentary election Atroshenko was elected in single-member constituency 207 for Viktor Yushchenko's Our Ukraine Bloc.

On 4 February 2005, Atroshenko was appointed Governor of Chernihiv Oblast, and on 12 December of the same year he was dismissed.

In 2006, he unsuccessfully ran for parliament on the electoral lists of the Our Ukraine Bloc.

In the 2010 Ukrainian local elections, Atroshenko was elected a deputy of the Chernihiv Oblast Council for the Strong Ukraine party.

In the 2012 Ukrainian parliamentary election Atroshenko was elected in single-member constituency 206 (located in Chernihivas a self-nominated candidate (with 40.64% of the votes). In parliament he joined the Party of Regions faction. Atroshenko voted for laws on dictatorship on 16 January 2014.

He was re-elected in the 2014 Ukrainian parliamentary election on a ticket from the Petro Poroshenko Bloc (as a non-partisan) again in single-member constituency 206 (located in Chernihiv, he won the constituency with 51.34% of the votes).

In the 2015 Ukrainian local elections, Atroshenko was elected mayor of Chernihiv for the Petro Poroshenko Bloc "Solidarity". In the 2020 Ukrainian local elections, he was re-elected as mayor for Native Home.

In February 2022, during the Siege of Chernihiv, he organized the resistance to the Russian attack on the city. On 2 March, he predicted that urban warfare in the city was possible. Two missiles hit a hospital in the city during the day, according to the health administration chief, Serhiy Pivovar.

On 10 March, he said that Russian forces had completely encircled Chernihiv, adding that the city was completely isolated and that critical infrastructure for its 300,000 residents was rapidly failing as it came under repeated bombardment.

On 25 March 2022, he shot a video from his car showing the destruction of Chernihiv, and on 26 March, he reported that more houses were destroyed than intact.

On 7 December 2022, the Yavoriv District Court removed Atroshenko of the post of mayor of Chernihiv because it was alleged that at the beginning of the war, he took his family out of shelling in an official car. On 16 December 2022, it became known that Atroshenko wrote a statement to the Security Service of Ukraine (SBU) and the police. Atroshchenko believes that he is constantly being watched. Prior to that, the "Chesno" movement, the Association of Cities of Ukraine, the Committee of Voters of Ukraine, lawyers and other experts called it political pressure on mayors and an attack on local self-government. Oleksandr Lomako became acting mayor of Chernihiv. Lomako is also a member of Atroshenko's party.

== See also ==
- List of mayors of Chernihiv
- Governor of Chernihiv Oblast
- European Solidarity
- Our Ukraine–People's Self-Defense Bloc
- Strong Ukraine
- Siege of Chernihiv
- Chernihiv
