= Mykhailo Holovko =

Ukrainian politician

- Михайло Головко
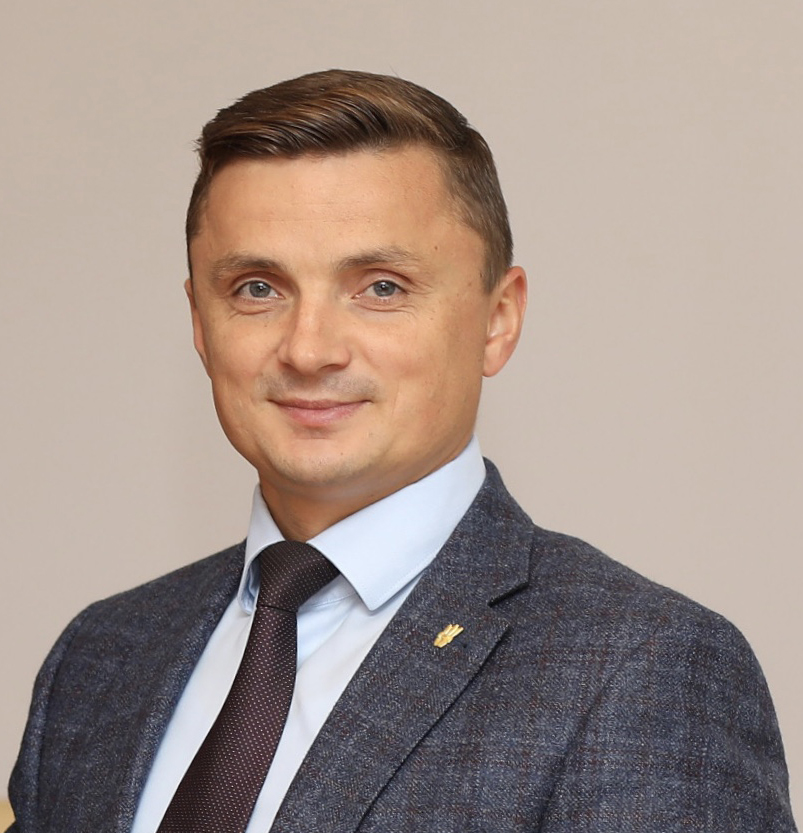

Chairman of the Ternopil Oblast Council
- In office 25 November 2020 – 1 August 2024
- Preceded by: Viktor Ovcharuk

People's Deputy of Ukraine
- In office 12 December 2012 – 29 August 2019
- Preceded by: Constituency established
- Succeeded by: Ihor Vasyliv
- Constituency: Ternopil Oblast, No. 164

Personal details
- Born: 3 May 1983 (age 43) Toky, Ukrainian SSR, Soviet Union
- Party: Svoboda
- Education: Ternopil National Economic University

Mykhailo Yosyfovych Holovko (Ukrainian: Миха́йло Йо́сифович Головко́; born 3 May 1983) is a Ukrainian politician. He served as a People's Deputy of Ukraine in the 7th and 8th convocations, representing Ukraine's 164th electoral district in northern Ternopil Oblast as a member of Svoboda.

== Life ==
- 2000 — graduated from Ternopil Public School No. 9 and entered Ternopil Academy of National Economy (now Ternopil National Economic University), speciality «International Economy».
- Having graduated from the institution of Higher Education (2005), he got the master's degree diploma.
- In 2006 he entered the postgraduate department at Ternopil Ivan Pul'uj National Technical University, department «Marketing at Enterprise» (graduated from it in 2011).
- 2012 — he got a diploma of the specialist, speciality “Law” in Inter-regional Academy of personnel management (Kyiv)
- 2007—2012 — a private entrepreneur (he was engaged in air-conditioning systems and ventilation systems setting).
- 2011—2012 — the head deputy of Ternopil Regional Organization All-Ukrainian Union Svoboda.

== Public-Political Activity ==
- 2002 — he became a member of all-Ukrainian Union "Svoboda".
- 2006 — he became the head of Ternopil city organization all-Ukrainian Union "Svoboda".
- 2006—2010 — a Deputy of Ternopil City Council of the Vth convocation.
- 2007 — he was included into the list of candidates of Ukraine's people's deputies from all-Ukrainian Union "Svoboda" under number 56.
- 2010—2012 — a Deputy of Ternopil City Council of the VІth convocation.
- 2011 — was elected a deputy head of Ternopil Regional Organization of all-Ukrainian Union "Svoboda".
- 28 October 2012 — was elected the Verkhovna Rada of People's Deputy of Ukraine of the 7th convocation at single-seat electoral district No. 164.
- He was a participant of Revolution of Dignity, was a superintendent of the camp site in Luteranska Street.
- At snap elections to the Verkhovna Rada in 2014 he was elected a people's deputy at election district No. 164 (Ternopil Region) from all-Ukrainian Union "Svoboda". He is a member of the Verkhovna Rada Committee on taxes and customs policy. He is a member of interfactional deputies' all-Ukrainian Union "Svoboda".

== Awards ==
24 July 2011 in Khorostkiv a celebrant of Ukrainian Orthodox Church of Kyivan Patriarchate Philaret after Divine Liturgy to honour St. rivnoapostil princess Olga and to honour consecrate cathedral of Saint Volodymyr and Olga awarded Mykhailo Holovko with the Order of St. rivnoaspostil Knight Volodymyr the Great. Holovko was awarded with the Order of St Nicholas the Wondermaker for the merits in rebirth of spirituality in Ukraine and local Ukrainian Orthodox Church settlement. He was awarded with medal for «Victimization and Love to Ukraine» and anniversary medal to 75 Years of Ukrainian Insurgent Army in Ternopil.

== Family ==
Father — Holovko Iosyf Bogdanovych, was born in Rozhysk Village, Pidvolochyskyi Region.Mother — Holovko (Yarotska) Galyna Ruslanivna, was born in Toky Village. Wife – Mariana Holovko (Shevchuk). Children — Hordii, Lukian, Bohdan and Makar.
