= Ihor Vasyliv =

Ukrainian politician (born 1979)

- Ігор Василів
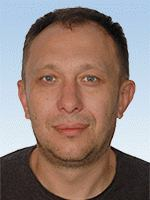
- Official portrait, 2019

People's Deputy of Ukraine
- Incumbent
- Assumed office 29 August 2019
- Preceded by: Mykhailo Holovko
- Constituency: Ternopil Oblast, No. 164

Personal details
- Born: 16 November 1979 (age 46) Ternopil, Ukrainian SSR, Soviet Union
- Party: Servant of the People
- Other political affiliations: Independent

Ihor Volodymyrovych Vasyliv (Ukrainian: Ігор Володимирович Василів; born 16 November 1979) is a Ukrainian politician currently serving as a People's Deputy of Ukraine from Ukraine's 164th electoral district.

== Early life and career ==
Ihor Volodymyrovych Vasyliv was born on 16 November 1979, in the city of Ternopil within what was then the Soviet Union. In 1997, he graduated from Ternopil Secondary School No. 20, before graduating from Ternopil Technical University in 2002, specialising in electrical engineering. Prior to his election as a People's Deputy, he was an entrepreneur.

== Political career ==
Vasyliv was a participant in both the 2004 Orange Revolution and the 2014 Revolution of Dignity. In 2014, he was elected as head of the Ternopil Oblast chapter of Automaidan, and organised financial support for Ukrainian volunteers fighting in the war in Donbas.

Vasyliv was elected as a People's Deputy of Ukraine in 2019, representing Ukraine's 164th electoral district. At the time of his election, he was an independent. Following his election, he became a member of the Verkhovna Rada Committee on Infrastructure and Transportation.

According to the news website Slovo i Dilo, Vasyliv, as of February 2021, has fulfilled more electoral promises than any other People's Deputy in Ternopil Oblast, with 24% of his promises fulfilled. Among his fulfilled electoral promises were to seize the property of corrupt individuals, an independent audit of the nation's roads, and simplifying the process of impeaching the President.
