= Native Home =

Native Home Рідний дім
- Leader: Vladyslav Atroshenko
- Founded: April 24, 2015
- Ideology: Economic liberalism
- Colours: Yellow
- Chernihiv Oblast Council: 19 / 64
- Chernihiv City Council: 24 / 42

Native Home (Ukrainian: Рідний дім, romanized: Ridnyi dim) is a political party in Ukraine.

== History ==
On April 24, 2015, then-mayor of Chernihiv, Vladyslav Atroshenko, announced the creation of the party Capitalist Party of Ukraine. Then a few months later, on September 15, 2015, the party name was changed to Native Home.
