= Ternopil Oblast Council =

Regional council in Ukraine

Ternopil Oblast Council Тернопільська обласна рада

Type
- Type: Unicameral
- Houses: 1

Leadership
- Speaker: Mykhailo Holovko

Structure
- Seats: 64
- Political groups: 17 European Solidarity; 13 Svoboda; 12 For the Future; 8 Servant of the People; 8 Fatherland; 6 Trust

Elections
- Last election: 25 October 2020

Meeting place
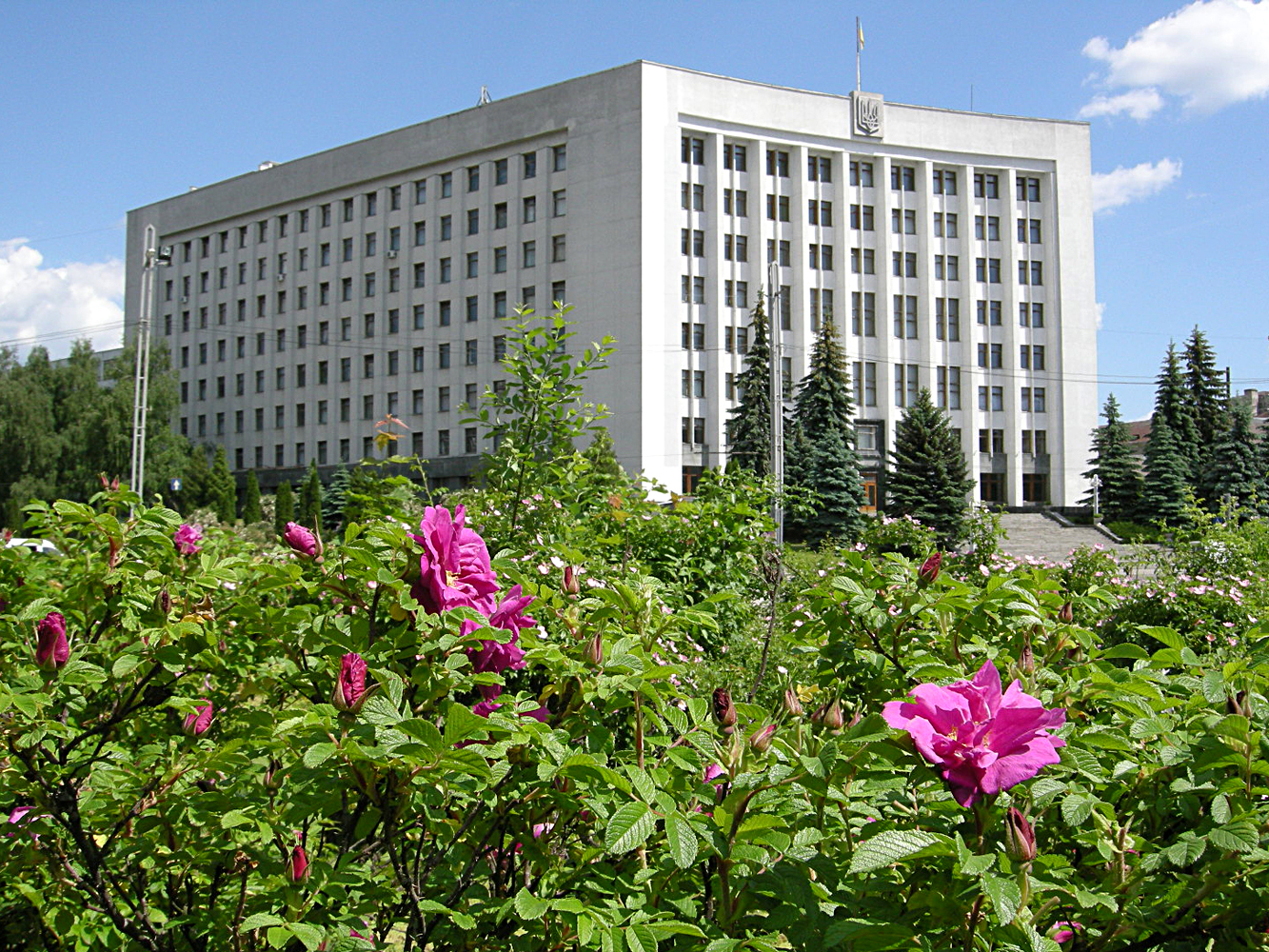
- Ternopil, Ternopil Oblast

Website
- http://te-rada.org/

The Ternopil Oblast Council (Ukrainian: Тернопільська обласна рада) is the regional oblast council (parliament) of the Ternopil Oblast located in western Ukraine. The council is composed of 64 members and is situated in the oblast's administrative center Ternopil.

During the night of 29 to 30 August 2003 the leader of the Our Ukraine faction in the Ternopil Oblast Council, Ivan Havdyda, was assassinated in Kyiv.

Council members are elected for five year terms. A party must gain more than 5 percent of the total vote.

== Recent elections ==
=== 2020 ===
Distribution of seats after the 2020 Ukrainian local elections

- 17 European Solidarity
- 13 Svoboda
- 12 For the Future
- 8 Servant of the People
- 8 Fatherland
- 6 Trust

Election date was 25 October 2020

=== 2015 ===
Distribution of seats after the 2015 Ukrainian local elections

- 18 Solidarity
- 13 Svoboda
- 10 Fatherland
- 6 Self Reliance
- 5 Radical Party
- 5 People's Movement "People's Control"
- 4 Civil Position
- 3 UKROP

Election date was 25 October 2015

== Chairmen ==
=== Regional executive committee ===
- Veniamin Yaglenko (1939–1940)
- Mikhail Slon (1940–1941)
- Yakov Artyushenko (1944–1946)
- Grigory Grishko (1946–1949)
- Mark Tkachuk (1949–1951)
- Fyodor Piznak (1951–1958)
- Vasily Lysenko (1958–1971)
- Ivan Ilyash (1971–1982)
- Oleksandr Tkachenko (1982–1985)
- Alexander Tovstanovsky (1985–1990)
- Vasyl Oliynyk (1990–1992)

=== Regional council ===
- Valentyn Ostrozhynsky (1990)
- Lyubomyr Malanchuk (1990)
- Vasyl Oliynyk (1990–1992)
- Bohdan Boyko (1992–1994)
- Borys Kosenko (1994–1996)
- Ivan Boichuk (1996–1998)
- Vasyl Oliynyk (1998–2002)
- Anatoliy Zhukinsky (2002–2005)
- Vasyl Kravets (2005–2006)
- Mykhailo Mykolenko (2006–2009)
- Oleksiy Kaida (2009–2012)
- Serhiy Tarashevsky (acting, 2012–2013)
- Vasyl Khominets (2013–2015)
- Viktor Ovcharuk (2015–2020)
- Mykhailo Holovko (since 2020)

== See also ==
- 2009 Ternopil Oblast local election
