= Mykhailo Krechko =

Ukrainian composer

People's Artist Mykhailo Krechko
- Михайло Кречко
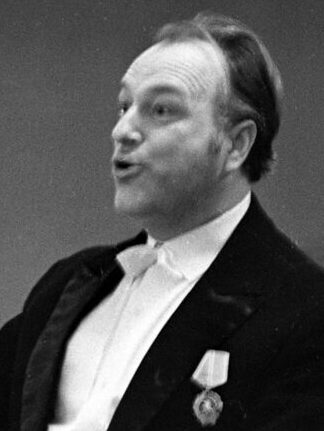
- Krechko in the 1970s
- Born: 5 September 1925; Poroškovo, Czechoslovakia (now Poroshkovo, Ukraine)
- Died: 25 November 1996 (aged 71); Lutsk, Ukraine
- Era: 20th century

Mykhailo Mykhailovych Krechko (Ukrainian: Михайло Михайлович Кречко; 5 September 1925 – 25 November 1996) was a Ukrainian composer, choral conductor and vocalist who was conductor of the Transcarpathian Folk Choir.

== Biography ==
Mykhailo Krechko was born on 5 September 1925 in the village of Poroshkovo (now Perechyn district of Transcarpathia). In 1954 he graduated from the Kyiv Conservatory with a degree in choral conducting from E. Skrypchynska and in a vocal class from Ivan Patorzhynskyi. From 1972 he was a teacher, and from 1990 he was a professor at the Kyiv Conservatory.

From 1954 to 1969 he was the artistic director and chief conductor of the Transcarpathian Folk Choir, from 1969 to 1983 he was the director and artistic director of the Dumka Chapel, and from 1983 he was the chief choirmaster of the Republican Children's Musical Theater in Kyiv. He also taught at the Kyiv Conservatory. Among his students are People's Artist of Ukraine Emil Sokach, Honored Artist O. Tarasenko, Chief Choirmaster of the Children's Musical Theater A. Kucher.

Mykhailo Krechko is an author of "Liturgy of John Chrysostom", original choirs, arrangement of folk songs for the choir, works on musicology, folklore collections. His daughter, Natalia Krechko, is a choirmaster, vocalist, Honored Artist of Ukraine.

Mykhailo Krechko died on 25 November 1996, in Lutsk. He was buried in Kyiv at the Baikove Cemetery.
