= Kharkiv Oblast Council =

Legislature of Kharkiv Oblast, Ukraine

Kharkiv Oblast Council Харківська обласна рада
- 9th convocation

Type
- Type: Unicameral
- Houses: 1

Leadership
- Speaker: Tetyana Yehorova-Lutsenko (Servant of the People)

Structure
- Seats: 120
- Political groups: Government (63): Kernes Bloc — Successful Kharkiv (46); Servant of the People (17); Supported by (29): Restoration of Ukraine (29); Opposition (28): Bloc Svitlychna Together! (17); European Solidarity (11)

Elections
- Last election: 25 October 2020

Meeting place
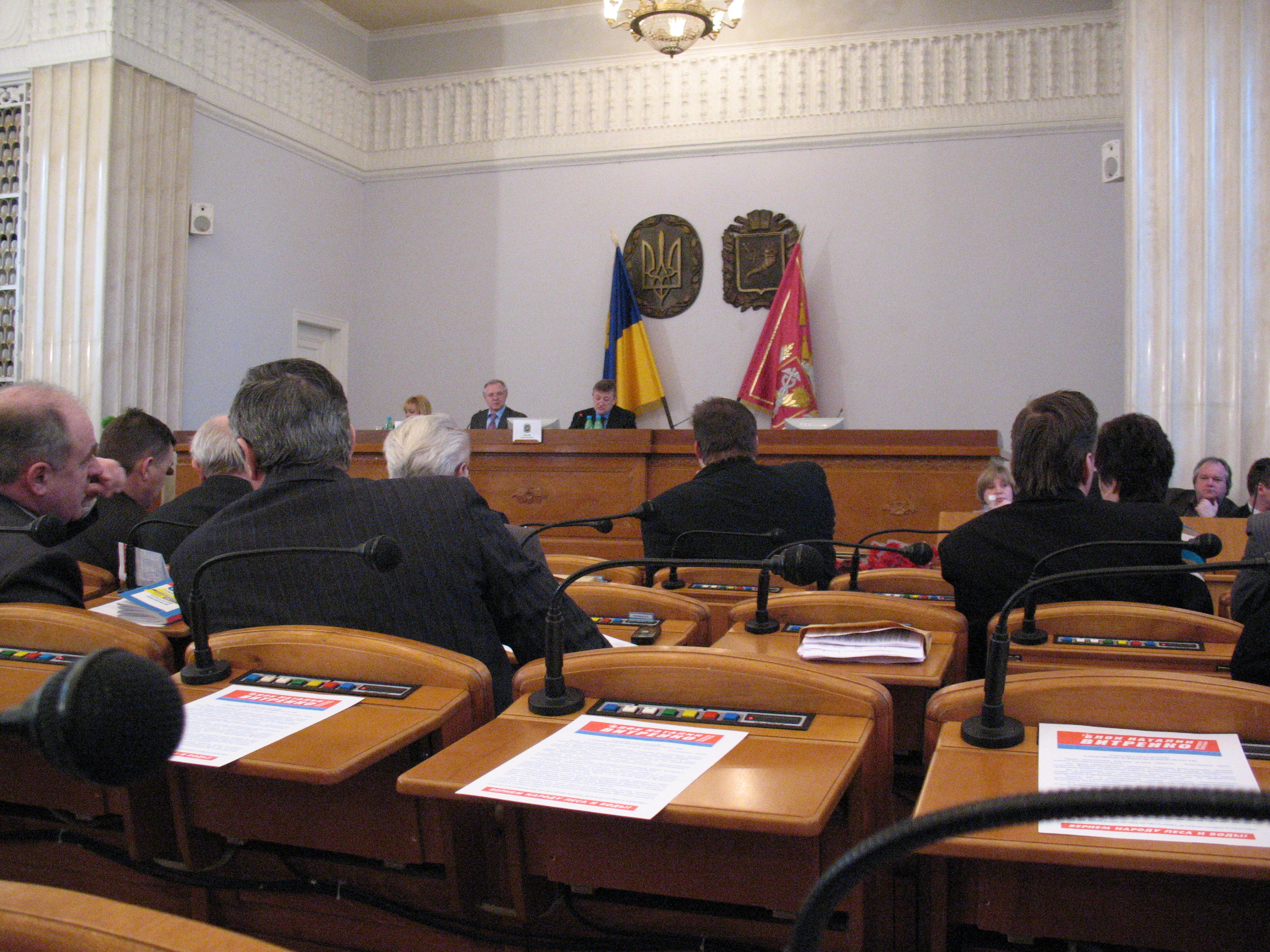
- 64 Sumska street, Kharkiv, Ukraine

Website
- http://www.oblrada.kharkov.ua/ukr/

The Kharkiv Oblast Council (Ukrainian: Харківська обласна рада) is the regional oblast council (parliament) of the Kharkiv Oblast (province) located in eastern Ukraine. The council is composed of 120 members and is situated in the oblast's administrative center Kharkiv. Council members are elected for five year terms. In order to gain representation on the council, a party must gain more than 5 percent of the total vote.

On 1 March 2022, during the Russian invasion of Ukraine, the building was bombed in a missile strike. According to the council, 29 people were killed.

== Recent elections ==
=== 2020 ===
Distribution of seats after the 2020 Ukrainian local elections:

- 46 Bloc Kernes — Successful Kharkiv!
- 29 Opposition Platform — For Life
- 17 Servant of the People
- 17 Bloc Svitlychna Together!
- 11 European Solidarity

The election date was 25 October 2020.

=== 2015 ===
Distribution of seats after the 2015 Ukrainian local elections

Distribution of seats from 2015 until 2020

Revival: 50 seats
Petro Poroshenko Bloc: 20 seats
Opposition Bloc: 19 seats
Self Reliance: 12 seats
Our Land: 11 seats
Fatherland: 8 seats

Election date was 25 October 2015

== Chairmen ==
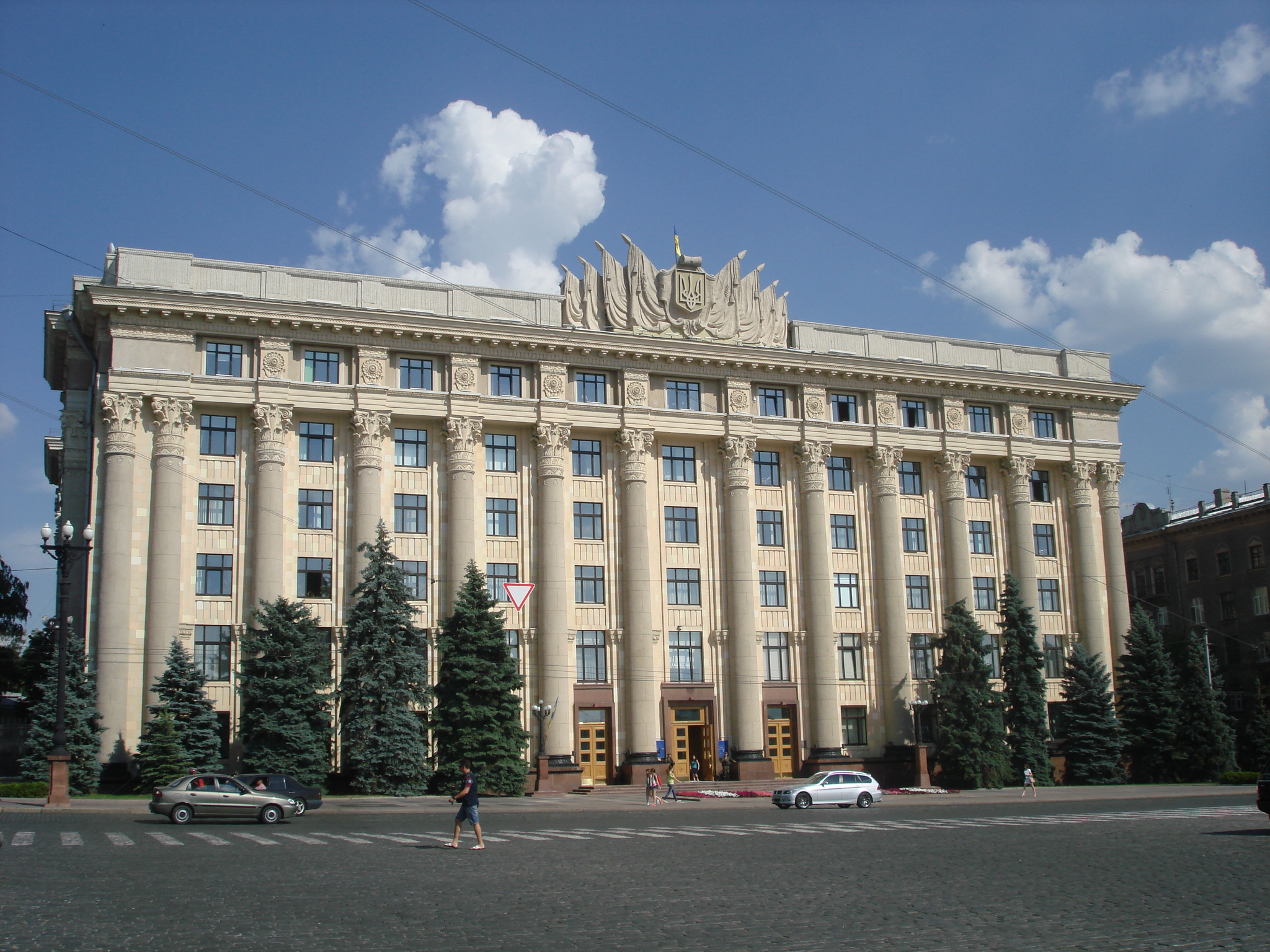
The building of the Kharkiv Oblast Council opposite Freedom Square

=== Regional executive committee ===
- Vasily Kuzmenko (1932–1933)
- Ilya Shelekhes (1933–1934)
- Ivan Fedyaev (1934–1935)
- Grigory Pryadchenko (1935–1937)
- Nikolay Prokopenko (1937–1938)
- Grigory Butenko (1938–1940)
- Pyotr Svinarenko (1940–1942)
- Artem Vakhnyuk (acting, 1943)
- Dmitry Zhila (acting, 1943)
- Ivan Voloshin (1943–1954)
- Dmitry Pisnyachevsky (1954–1963)
- Dmitry Pisnyachevsky (agrarian, 1963–1964)
- Konstantin Trusov (industrial, 1963–1964)
- Dmitry Pisnyachevsky (1964–1968)
- Andrey Bezditko (1968–1983)
- Oleksandr Maselsky (1983–1990)
- Yuri Titov (1990–1991)

=== Regional council ===
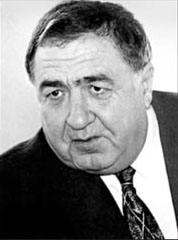
Oleksandr Maselskyi, the first Chairman of the Kharkiv Oblast Council

- Oleksandr Maselsky (1991–1992)
- Volodymyr Tyahlo (1992–1994)
- Oleksandr Maselsky (1994–1996)
- Volodymyr Tyahlo (1996–2002)
- Oleksiy Kolesnik (2002–2004)
- Yevhen Kushnaryov (2004–2005)
- Oleh Shapovalov (2005–2006)
- Vasiliy Salygin (2006–2008)
- Serhii Chernov (2008–2020)
- Artur Tovmasyan (2020–2021)
- Tetiana Yehorova-Lutsenko (since 2021)
