= Ukrainian Processing Center =

Ukrainian company

- Type: Private Joint-stock company
- Industry: Processing, Payment card industry, Acquirer, Electronic commerce, Fraud Monitoring, SMS banking, System of payment card issuing, ATM Channel Management, United ATM network "ATMosphere"
- Founded: 1997
- Headquarters: Kyiv, Ukraine
- Key people: Anton Romanchuk (Chairman of the Board)
- Website: www.upc.ua

Ukrainian Processing Center (UPC, Ukrainian: Український процесінговий центр) is a Ukrainian company founded in 1997 which provides processing services and software for banks. UPC was the first Ukrainian company within the sphere of processing that received MSP and TPP status in Visa and Mastercard. In April 1997 UPC processed the first ATM EC/MC card transaction. Since 2005 UPC has become part of the Raiffeisen Bank International. The head office of UPC is based in Kyiv. Ukrainian Processing Center provides services to banks in Central and East Europe in the sphere of processing payment cards (salary cards, debit cards, credit cards, pre-paid cards, magnetic stripe cards, smart cards, EMV cards and also contactless smart cards like Mastercard PayPass and Visa payWave), merchant acquiring and ATM channel management. UPC also offers integrated IT systems for electronic commerce, card transactions monitoring systems of fraud prevention, card issuing system and SMS banking service. Moreover, UPC was the initiator of the establishment of the united ATM network "ATMoSphere", which consists of payment cards issuing banks. Annually UPC processes more than 400 million of payment card transactions.

== History ==
In 1997, UPC was established as a processing center providing processing services of debit and credit cards for banks. UPC was the first Ukrainian company that received the status of Member Service Provider Mastercard и Third Party Processor Visa, and processed first ATM transaction on Eurocard MasterCard on 23 April 1997 in 1997. UPC is a member of Ukrainian Interbank Payment Systems Member Association EMA. UPC's client base consists of largest Ukrainian banks and bank organizations which are issuers or acquirers of payment cards. In 2005, UPC became a part of Raiffeisen Bank International. In 2007, UPC started to provide services on the international market. Now UPC processes payment cards, provides ATM and POS acquiring services in Hungary, Albania and Kosovo, and supports electronic commerce in Croatia. Since 2011, UPC processes contactless payments for an Austrian acquiring company.

== Work standards ==
UPC was the first among Ukrainian processing centers that received a PCI DSS certificate, in January 2009. Since that time, UPC is certified every year by international auditors to confirm the complete correspondence to PCI DSS requirements.
