= Yevhen Prokopenko =

Ukrainian footballer (born 1988)

Personal information
- Full name: Yevhen Mykolayovych Prokopenko
- Date of birth: 13 September 1988 (age 38)
- Place of birth: Sevastopol, Ukrainian SSR
- Height: 1.78 m (5 ft 10 in)
- Position: Midfielder

Senior career*
| Years | Team | Apps | (Gls) |
| 2006–2023 | Sevastopol | 21 | (1) |
| 2008–2009 | → Sevastopol-2 | 20 | (1) |
- * Club domestic league appearances and goals

Yevhen Mykolayovych Prokopenko (Ukrainian: Євген Миколайович Прокопенко; born 13 September 1988) is a Ukrainian former footballer who played as a midfielder.
