= Valentyn Melnychuk (politician) =

Ukrainian politician (born 1947)

- Валентин Мельничук
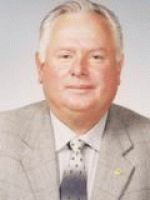

Member of the Verkhovna Rada
- In office 14 May 2002 – 3 April 2003

Governor of Chernihiv Oblast
- In office 26 December 2002 – 21 December 2005
- President: Leonid Kuchma; Viktor Yushchenko
- Prime Minister: Viktor Yanukovych; Mykola Azarov (acting); Viktor Yanukovych; Yulia Tymoshenko; Yuriy Yekhanurov
- Preceded by: Hryhoriy Panchenko (acting)
- Succeeded by: Vladyslav Atroshenko

1st Mayor of Chernihiv
- In office October 1990 – 3 May 1992
- Succeeded by: Vitaliy Kosykh

Personal details
- Born: Valentyn Vasylovych Melnychuk; 26 October 1947 (age 78) Berdychiv, Ukraine, Soviet Union
- Party: Social Democratic Party of Ukraine (united)

Valentyn Vasylovych Melnychuk (Ukrainian: Валентин Васильович Мельничук; born on 26 October 1947), is a Ukrainian politician who had last served as the Governor of Chernihiv Oblast from 2002 to 2005. He also served as the member of the Verkhovna Rada from 2002 to 2003.

Melnychuk was also the 1st Mayor of Chernihiv from 1990 to 1992.

== Biography ==
Valentyn Melnychuk was born on 26 October 1947 in Berdychiv, Zhytomyr Oblast.

After graduating from PTU-4 in Berdychiv, he was an electrical fitter, "Progress" plant and was an engineer of VNDIMIV in Chernihiv. He served in the army. He studied at the institute.

From December 1972 to 1976, he was a power engineer, chief engineer of a vegetable drying plant, in Chernihiv.

In June 1979, he was the chief engineer beer non-alcoholic association "Desna" in Chernihiv. In May 1983, he was promoted to director.

In October 1990, he was the Chairman of the Chernihiv City Council, and from January 1991, he was also Chairman of the City Executive Committee.

On 23 March 1992, Melnychuk was appointed Representative of the President of Ukraine in the Chernihiv Oblast. He left office on 5 February 1995.

In 1995, he was the head of the Department for Consumer Protection.

In November 1995 to 2002, he was the general director of CJSC "Chernihiv Brewery Plant "Desna".

In 2002, Melnychuk was elected to the Verkhovna Rada of Ukraine.

On 26 December 2002, he became the governor of Chernihiv Oblast while retaining a position as a member of the Verkhovna Rada until 3 April 2003.

On 21 January 2005, he left office.

From 2006 to 2010, he was an associate professor of the Department of Management and Administration of the Chernihiv State Institute of Economics and Management.

From 2015 to 2020, he last served as the First Deputy Chairman of the Chernihiv Oblast Council.
