= Chernihiv Oblast Council =

Legislature of Chernihiv Oblast, Ukraine

Type
- Type: Unicameral
- Houses: 1

Leadership
- Speaker: Olena Dmytrenko

Structure
- Seats: 64
- Political groups: Following the 2020 elections: Native Home (19); Our Land (9); Servant of the People (8); Radical Party (7); Fatherland (6); Opposition Platform — For Life (5); For the Future (5); European Solidarity (5)

Elections
- Last election: 25 October 2020

Meeting place
- Chernihiv, Chernihiv Oblast

Website
- http://chor.gov.ua/

The Chernihiv Oblast Council (Ukrainian: Чернігівська обласна рада) is the regional oblast council (parliament) of the Chernihiv Oblast (province) located in Northern Ukraine.

Council members are elected for five year terms. In order to gain representation in the council, a party must gain more than 5 percent of the total vote.

== Recent elections ==
=== 2020 ===
On October 25, 2020, the Chernihiv Oblast Council conducted elections as part of the 2020 Ukrainian local elections, and the results were as follows:

- 19 Native Home
- 9 Our Land
- 8 Servant of the People
- 7 Radical Party
- 6 Fatherland
- 5 Opposition Platform — For Life
- 5 For the Future
- 5 European Solidarity

=== 2015 ===
On October 25, 2015, the council conducted elections as part of the 2015 Ukrainian local elections, and the results were as follows:

- 12 Solidarity
- 12 Radical Party
- 11 Fatherland
- 11 Our Land
- 9 Agrarian Party of Ukraine
- 5 UKROP
- 4 Opposition Bloc

== Chairmen ==
=== Regional executive committee ===
- 1932–1934 Mikhail Golubyatnikov
- 1934–1937 Solomon Zager
- 1937 Georgy Bogatyrev
- 1937–1938 Vlas Sokolov
- 1938–1941 Sergei Kostyuchenko
- 1941–1943 Nazi Germany occupation
- 1943–1949 Sergei Kostyuchenko
- 1949–1950 Vasily Kapranov
- 1950–1959 Leonid Vandenko
- 1959–1961 Porfiry Kumanyok
- 1961–1963 Nikolai Borisenko
- 1963–1964 Boris Gorban (industrial)
- 1963–1964 Vasily Zamula (agrarian)
- 1964–1973 Vasily Zamula
- 1973–1981 Viktor Filonenko
- 1981–1984 Vladimir Nikulishchev
- 1984–1990 Mikhail Grishko
- 1990–1992 Oleksandr Lysenko
- 1994–1995 Petro Shapoval

=== Regional council ===
- 1990–1991 Vasyl Lisovenko
- 1991–1994 Oleksandr Lysenko
- 1994–2001 Petro Shapoval
- 2001–2006 Vasyl Kovalyov
- 2006–2010 Nataliia Romanova
- 2010–2014 Anatoliy Melnyk
- 2014–2015 Mykola Zvyeryev
- 2015–2020 Ihor Vdovenko
- 2020–present Olena Dmytrenko

== See also ==
- Governor of Chernihiv Oblast
