= Anton Kukhta =

Ukrainian footballer

Personal information
- Full name: Anton Oleksandrovych Kukhta
- Date of birth: 29 June 1991 (age 35)
- Place of birth: Ukraine
- Position: Striker

Youth career
- 2004–2006: Kremin-91
- 2006–2008: YFC Kharkiv

Senior career*
| Years | Team | Apps | (Gls) |
| 2009 | Kremin | 5 | (0) |
| Total | | 5 | (0) |
- * Club domestic league appearances and goals as of 7 October 2009

Anton Oleksandrovych Kukhta (Ukrainian: Антон Олександрович Кухта; born 29 June 1991) is a Ukrainian football striker who played for Ukrainian Second League club Kremin.

== Club history ==
Anton Kukhta began his football career in Kremin-91 in Kremenchuk. He signed with FC Kremin Kremenchuk in October 2008. In August 2009 Anton left Kremin.

== Career statistics ==
As of 7 October 2009

| Club | Season | League | | Cup | | Total | |
| Club | Season | Apps | Goals | Apps | Goals | Apps | Goals |
|---|---|---|---|---|---|---|---|
| Kremin | 2008–09 | 5 | 0 | 0 | 0 | 5 | 0 |
| Kremin | 2009–10 | 0 | 0 | 0 | 0 | 0 | 0 |
| Kremin | Total | 5 | 0 | 0 | 0 | 5 | 0 |
| Career | Total | 5 | 0 | 0 | 0 | 5 | 0 |
