= Chernihiv City Council =

Local authority of Chernihiv, Ukraine

Chernihiv City Council Чернігівська міська рада

Type
- Type: City council

History
- Founded: 1932

Structure
- Seats: 42
- Political groups: Government (24): Native Home (24); Opposition (14): European Solidarity (4); Servant of the People (3); Our Land (4); Independent (3); Vacant (4): Vacant (4)

Elections
- Last election: 25 October 2020
- Next election: 2025 (May be postponed due to martial law in Ukraine)

Meeting place
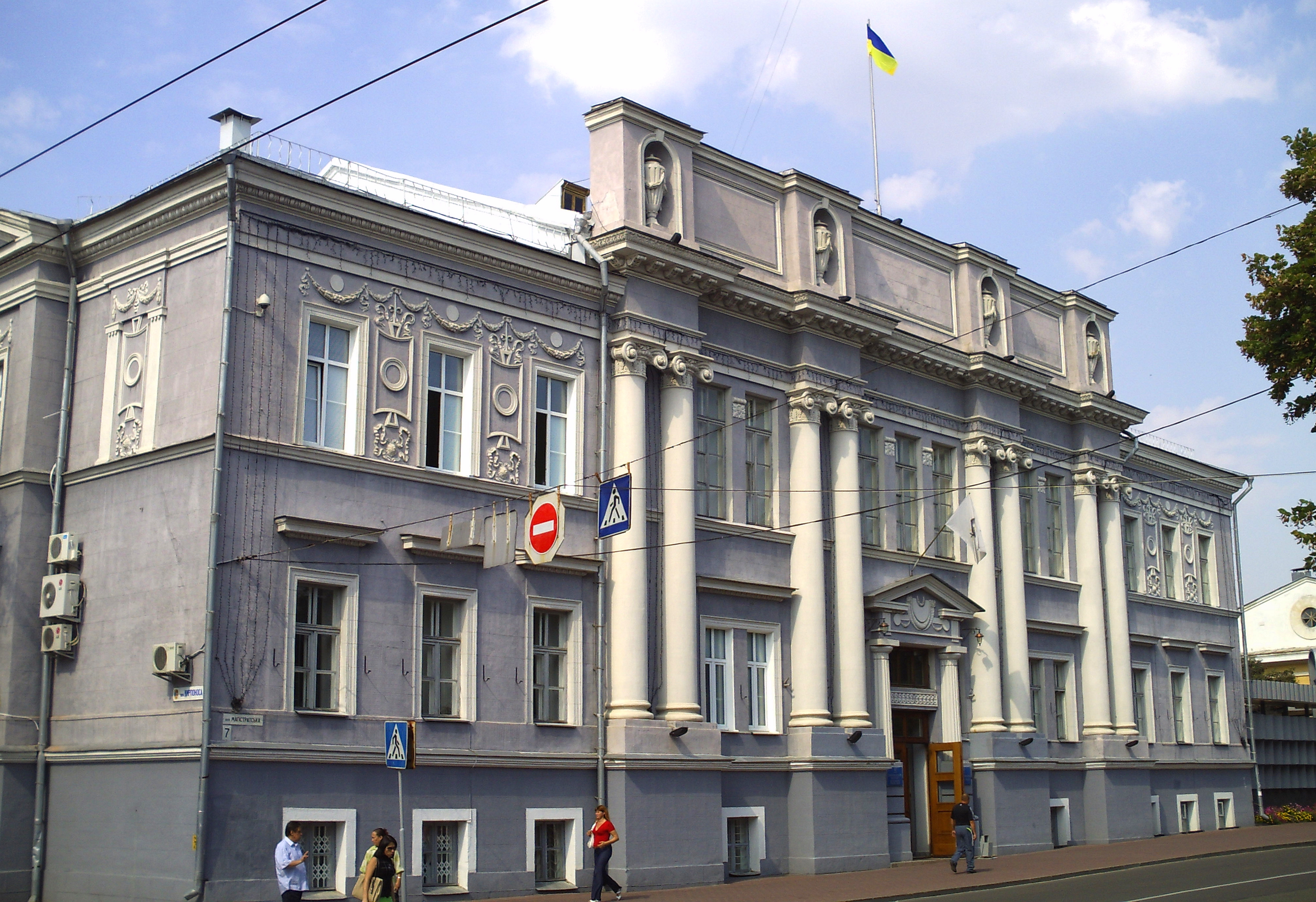
- 7 Mahistratska Street, Chernihiv, Ukraine

Website
- www.chernigiv-rada.gov.ua

Chernihiv City Council (Ukrainian: Чернігівська міська рада) administrative-territorial unit in the Chernihiv region of Ukraine; local government body. The administrative center is the city of Chernihiv.

== History ==
On October 15, 1932, a city council was established within the Chernihiv region. On December 22, 1973, two districts were formed as part of the City Council: Desnyansky and Novozavodskaya, by the Decree of the Presidium of the Supreme Soviet of the USSR of December 22, 1973

In 1999, the villages of Chernihiv district Pevtsy and Aleksandrovka, part of the village Novoselovka (Novoselovsky village council) with a total area of 513.4 hectares were included in the Desnyansky district of Chernihiv City Council, Resolution of the Verkhovna Rada of Ukraine Chernihiv region) from July 8, 1999 № 872-14. Also in 1999, 50.7 hectares of the territory of the Soviet-Sloboda village council (Zarechny and Astra microdistricts) and 160.2 hectares of the Shestovitsky village council (airport, west of Shestovitsa) were included in the Novozavodsky district of the Chernihiv City Council.

== Geography ==
The territory of the City Council is an enclave of the Chernihiv region. Chernihiv City Council takes the right bank of the Desna. The western part of the City Council - Novozavodsky district (41.29%), the eastern - Desnyansky (58.71%). Novozavodsky district has two exclaves (on the territory of Chernihiv district): the territory of Zarechny microdistrict and Chernihiv airport (Shestovitsa).

== Administration ==
The head of the council is Vladyslav Atroshenko (since 2015). The head of the council is elected by the citizens for a term of 5 years. The council consists of 42 deputies.

== Transport ==
- Buses 1, 2, 2A, 3, 5, 7, 9, 10, 15, 17, 20, 22, 23, 24, 25, 27, 28, 29, 30, 31, 32, 33, 34, 35, 37, 38, 39, 42,
- Trolleybuses 1, 2, 3, 4, 5, 6, 9, 10
- Minibuses 33

== See also ==
- Municipal council
