= Oleksandr Maselsky =

Ukrainian politician

- Олександр Масельський
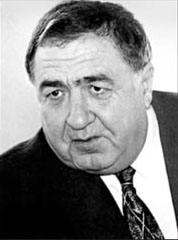

1st Governor of Kharkiv Oblast
- In office 7 July 1995 – 12 April 1996
- Succeeded by: Oleh Dyomin

Chairman of the Kharkiv Oblast Council
- In office 26 June 1994 – 12 April 1996
- Succeeded by: Volodymyr Tyahlo
- In office 21 January 1991 – 21 April 1992
- Preceded by: Volodymyr Tyahlo
- Succeeded by: Volodymyr Tyahlo

Vice Prime Minister of Ukraine for Agriculture
- In office 21 May 1991 – 29 October 1991

Chairman of the Kharkiv Regional executive committee
- In office March 1983 – March 1992
- Preceded by: Andrey Bezditko
- Succeeded by: position abolished

Personal details
- Born: Oleksandr Stepanovych Maselsky; December 7, 1936 Khmelove, Mala Vyska Raion, Kirovohrad Oblast, Ukrainian SSR, Soviet Union
- Died: April 12, 1996 (aged 59) Kharkiv, Ukraine

Oleksandr Stepanovych Maselsky (Ukrainian: Олександр Степанович Масельский; 7 December 1936 – 12 April 1996), was a Soviet and Ukrainian politician who had served as the first governor of Kharkiv Oblast from 1995 until his death.

In 2006, he was posthumously awarded the title of Hero of Ukraine, with the Order of the State.

From the beginning of the 1980s until his death, he held a number of senior positions in the state authorities of the Kharkiv Oblast: the Chairman of the Executive Committee of the Kharkiv Regional Council of People's Deputies from 1983 to 1992, the Chairman of the Kharkiv Oblast Council from 1991 to 1992 and 1994 to 1996), and Representative of the President of Ukraine in the Kharkiv Oblast from 1992 to 1995.

He was a candidate of agricultural sciences, social and political activist. He was a Deputy of the Verkhovna Rada of the Ukrainian SSR of the 11th convocation. He was the Member of the Central Committee of the Communist Party of Ukraine in from 1986 to 1991. He was the People's deputy of the USSR in from 1989 to 1991.

== Biography ==
Oleksandr Maselsky was born on 7 December 1936 in the village of Khmelove, Kirovohrad Oblast, to the family of a collective farmers, to his father, Stepan Ivanovych, and his mother Okeksandra Artemivna (nee Zaporozhets). In addition with Oleksandr, the family had three more sons and two daughters.

In 1954, Maselsky began his career, becoming a collective farmer, then from 1955 to 1957 (according to other sources - 1958), he served in the Air Force of the Soviet Armed Forces.

After graduating from the army in 1958, Maselsky entered the Uman Agricultural Institute, which he chose according to the "Handbook for applicants to higher educational institutions of the USSR". While studying at this university, he met his future wife, Sofiya Hrihoryivna, the daughter of the teachers of this university, who was several years younger than him. In 1963, Maselsky graduated from the institute and married Sofiya.

In 1963, Maselsky, together with his wife, were sent for distribution to the collective farm (according to other sources, the state farm) "Communist" in the Krasnolimansky district of the Donetsk Oblast. Working in that position, Maselsky managed not only to quickly earn authority and respect among his subordinates, but also by setting a personal example motivated them to work harder. After working as a foreman for three months, Maselsky was promoted to chief agronomist of the collective farm.

Maselsky joined the CPSU in 1965.

Maselsky worked as the chief agronomist of the Kommunist collective farm until 1966, after which, on the advice of his father-in-law and to improve his knowledge and skills in the field of agriculture, he decided to continue his studies and entered graduate school at the Kyiv Research Institute of Agriculture.

However, Maselsky worked in the Slavyansk region for only a few months, after which he worked for some time at the Ukrainian Research Institute of Vegetation, Breeding and Genetics. V. Ya. Yuriev, who was in Kharkiv. In that research institution, Malelsly began working with such famous scientists as Oleksandr Hlyantsev, Borys Huryev and Ilya Polyakov.

In October of the same year, Maselsky became the director of the Krasny Oktyabr state farm in the Balakleysky district of the Kharkov region, which was administered by the V. Ya. Yuryev Institute. Despite the fact that this state farm was one of the largest seed farms, it did not occupy a leading position in this industry. Over the four years of leadership of the state farm "Red October" Maselsky was able to bring it to the forefront.

In 1973, at the Ukrainian Research Institute. V. Ya. Yuryeva, Alexander Maselsky nevertheless defended his thesis on the topic “Corn yield depending on the area of nutrition and fertilizers when grown on gray podzolized soil” for the degree of candidate of agricultural sciences.

In 1973, Maselsky was appointed to the post of second secretary of the Balakliysky District Committee of the Communist Party of Ukraine, where he dealt with agricultural issues.

According to contemporaries, Maselsky rather quickly "outgrew the position of second secretary and he needed to be given space", in addition, the then first secretary of the Balakleysky district committee of the Communist Party of Ukraine Vladimir Shmatko, seeing the potential of his subordinate, "was afraid that he would not outgrow him".

In 1974, due to the intrigues of the first secretary of the Valkovsky District Committee of the Communist Party of Ukraine, Dmytro Sudak, Anatoly Ilchenko was removed from the post of chairman of the Valkovsky District Executive Committee. Sudak, who was constantly afraid that he might be dismissed from his post, hoped that instead of Ilchenko, an inexperienced and unprepared functionary would be appointed chairman of the district executive committee.

Maselsky was appointed chairman of the Valkovsky District Executive Committee in August 1974. Relations between Sudak and Maselsky did not work out right away. Maselsky “worked for three”, while Sudak only set tasks and publicly criticized most of his actions, which interfered with productive work. The conflict between Sudak and Maselsky ended already in November of the same year, when at the plenum of the Valkovsky District Committee of the Communist Party of Ukraine the latter was elected the first secretary of this committee.

Shortly after Maselsky took the post of first secretary of the Valkovsky district committee of the Communist Party of Ukraine, the district entered the top five in a number of indicators. Among the achievements of Maselsky in this position, the district began to specialize in animal husbandry, including the production of beef and pork, residential buildings, social and cultural institutions, and roads were built on the territory of the district. Another important aspect of the activities of Maselsky in this position was the reconstruction of the village of Snezhkov, within which all buildings belonging to the socio-cultural complex were rebuilt, all apartments in the village were gasified, connected to centralized heating and water supply.

Between 1979 and 1983, he was the Deputy Chairman, then promoted to First Deputy Chairman of the Executive Committee of the Kharkiv Regional Council.

From January 1979 to July 1982, he was the Deputy Chairman of the Executive Committee of the Kharkiv Regional Council of People's Deputies. From July 1982 to March 1983, he was the first deputy chairman of the executive committee of the Kharkiv Regional Council of People's Deputies.

Between March 1983 and January 1991, he was the chairman of the executive committee of the Kharkiv Regional Council of People's Deputies.

He was elected a deputy of the Supreme Soviet of the Ukrainian SSR of the 11th convocation. From 1989 to 1991, he became the People's Deputy of the USSR from the Lozovsky district of the Kharkov region, was a member of the CPSU and a member of the Central Committee of the Communist Party of Ukraine., and was a member of the XIX All-Union Conference of the CPSU.

From January 1991 and April 1992, he was the Chairman of the Kharkiv Regional Council of People's Deputies and Chairman of the Executive Committee of the Kharkiv Regional Council of People's Deputies.

From 21 May - 29 October 1991, Maselsky was the Vice Prime Minister of the Ukrainian SSR (Ukraine) (for agriculture) in the government of Vitold Fokin.

In 1992, Maselsky became the Representative of the President of Ukraine in the Kharkiv Oblast.

In 1994, he became the Chairman of the Kharkiv Regional Council of People's Deputies.

In July 1995, the office was changed as Maselsky became the first Governor of Kharkiv Oblast.

== Death ==
In January 1996, Maselsky's health began to deteriorate, as he "was often sick, even went to the hospital." Only people close to him knew about the deterioration in Maselsky’s health, who associated this with the stress experienced during the aftermath of the accident at the Dikanevsky wastewater treatment plant in June 1995. But starting from the second half of March, Maselsky's health improved and he returned to work.

A few days before his death, Maselsky gave an interview to the Panorama publication, and on the day of his death, on April 12, until 14:00, he led a meeting of the Kharkov Regional Council (at which he spoke), after the end of the meeting, he worked for some time in his office in the Gosprom building, in At 17:00, he went to one of the districts of the Kharkiv region in a company car, and died on the way back home.

According to the "Conclusion on the causes of death of Oleksandr Stepanovych Maselsky", which was signed by the head of branch No. 1 of the Kharkiv Regional Bureau of Forensic Medical Examinations Yu. "atherosclerosis of the aorta, complicated by rupture of its wall and hemorrhage into the cavity of the heart sac against the background of hypertension."

On April 4, 1996, President of Ukraine Leonid Kuchma issued a Decree “On organizing the funeral of the chairman of the Kharkiv Regional Council, Chairman of the Kharkiv Regional State Administration A. Maselsky”, according to which the “State Commission for Organizing the Funeral of the Chairman of the Kharkiv Regional Council, Chairman of the Kharkiv Regional State Administration Oleksandr Stepanovych Maselsky” under the chairmanship of Yevhen Marchuk, which also included: Volodymyr Baibikov, Vasyl Durdynets, Oleh Domino, Anatoliy Epifanov, Valeriy Efremov, Mykola Zaludyak, Pavlo Lazarenko, Valeriy Pustovoitenko, Vasyl Ryabokon, Volodymyr Semynozhenko, Stanyslav Sivokon, Mykola Sukhomlin, Dmytro Tabachnyk, and Vasyl Tatsiy.

The farewell ceremony and funeral of Maselsky took place on Tuesday, 16 April. He was buried on the central alley of the Kharkiv City Cemetery No. 2 on Pushkinskaya Street, later, next to Maselsky, the mayor of Kharkiv (1990-1996) and the chairman of the Kharkov Regional State Administration, Yevhen Kushnarov, and the 5th Mayor of Kharkiv (2010-2020) Hennadiy Kernes (1959-2020).

At the farewell ceremony, among those present were: President Kuchma, Deputy Chairman of the Verkhovna Rada of Ukraine Oleh Dyomin, Kharkiv Mayor Yevhen Kushnarev, Chairman of the Kirovograd Regional State Administration Mykola Sukhomlin, Governor of the Belgorod Oblast Yevgeny Savchenko, Head of the Kharkiv Military Garrison Volodymyr Tolubko and Metropolitan of Kharkiv and Bogodukhovsky Nicodemus.

Also among those who expressed their condolences were: ex-Prime Minister of Ukraine Vitaliy Masol, Deputy Prime Minister of Ukraine for Political and Legal Affairs, Oleksandr Yemets, Minister of Defense of Ukraine, Valeriy Shmarov, Minister of Agriculture and Food of Ukraine, Pavlo Gaydutsky, Minister of the Environment and of Nuclear Safety of Ukraine, Yuriy Kostenko, Chairman of the State Customs Committee of Ukraine, Leonid Derkach, Chairman of the Kyiv City State Administration Leonid Kosakovsky, Chairman of the Zaporozhye Regional State Administration Vyacheslav Pokhvalsky, Chairman of the Ternopil Regional State Administration Borys Kosenko, Mayor of Poltava Anatoliy Kukoba, ex-Chairman of the Executive Committee of the Lviv of the Regional Council of People's Deputies Mikhaylo Kirey, Governor of the Moscow Region Anatoly Tyazhlov, Governor of the Rostov Region Vladimir Chub, Abmbasseesor of Georgia in the Imereti Region and Mayor of Kutaisi Teimuraz Shashiashvili, Ambassador of the Netherlands to Ukraine Robert Serry, Academician of the National Academy of Sciences of Ukraine Petro Tronko.

== Personal life ==
With his wife Sofiyia, he raised his daughter Iryna, who was married to Kharkiv businessman Oleksandr Yaroslavsky and grandson Oleksandr.

One of the nephews of Oleksandr was Stepan Maselsky, who from 2004 to 2005, like his uncle, headed the Kharkiv Regional State Administration.

"I have always worked, in recent years - as an entomologist at the sanitary and epidemiological station, I ran the household myself, raised Ira. I didn't have housekeepers or nannies. Over the years, we went to the sea a couple of times, mostly rested in Berminvody."

— Sofia Maselska

== Memory ==
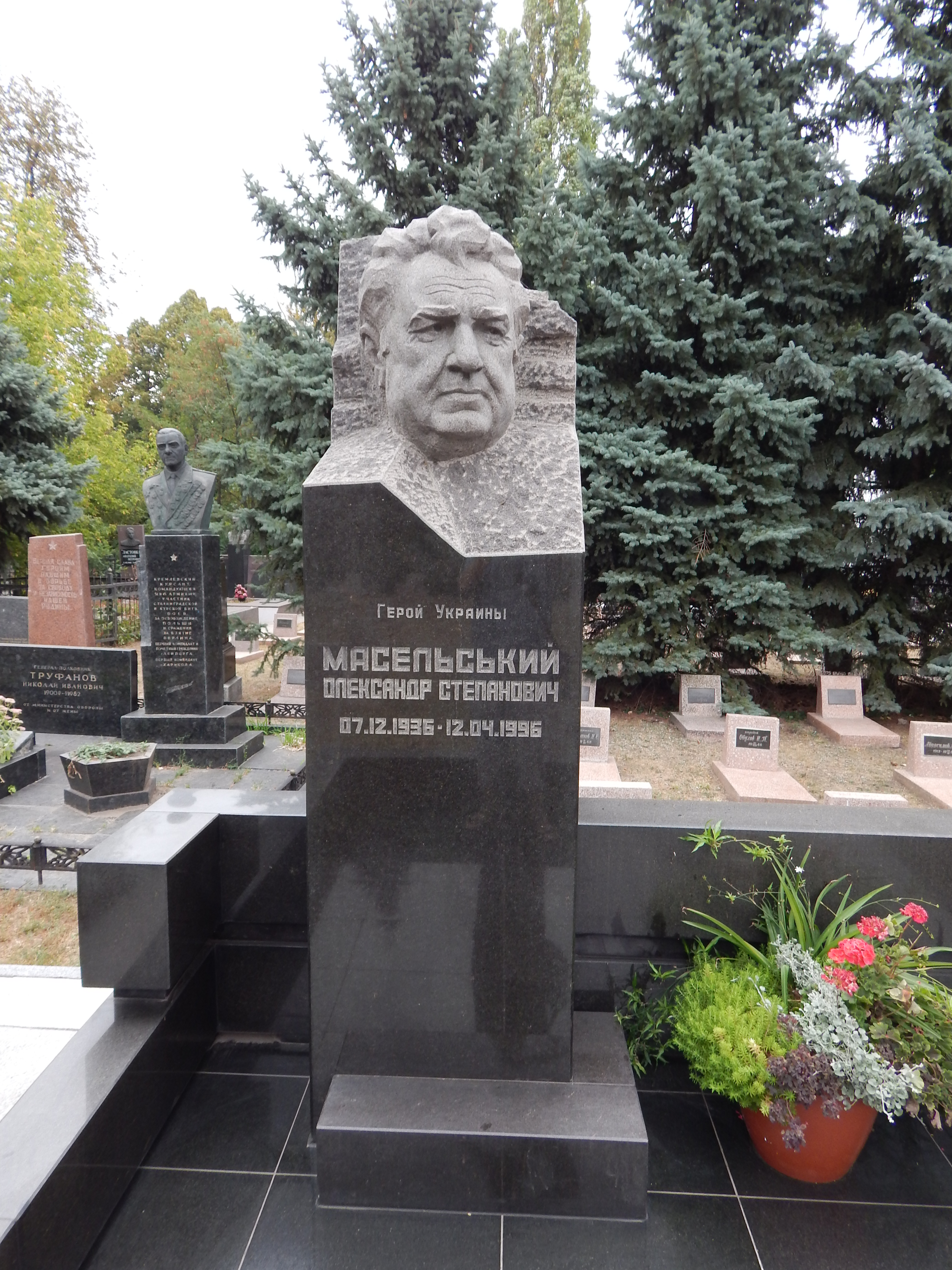
Maselsky's grave in 2019

On 7 December 1996, on the 60th anniversary of Maselsky, on the facade of the 8th entrance of Gosprom, in which Maselsky worked from 1979 to 1996, a memorial plaque was opened, and on the same day another memorial plaque was opened - on the facade of the house No. 17 on Girshman Street, where Maselsky lived, and a tombstone at the Kharkiv City Cemetery No. 2.

In 2003, according to one of the Decrees of the Cabinet of Ministers of Ukraine, the Valkovsky Lyceum was named after A. S. Maselsky. The construction of the lyceum began in 1995 under the personal supervision of Maselsky, and its opening was planned in 1997. However, after Maselsky's death, the construction was frozen, and the first stage of construction was completed only in 2001. An appeal regarding the presentation of the Maselsky Lyceum was drawn up by the teaching staff immediately after his death in 1996. On the basis of the school, a corner in Maselsky's memory was created, in which personal belongings, memories and archival materials about him were collected.

On 29 April 2004, the Kharkiv metro station "Industrialnaya" was renamed "Named after A.S. Maselsky".

In March 2006, a memorial plaque was unveiled on the facade of the building of the Valkovsky District Council in memory of Maselsky.
