= Bohdan Boyko =

Ukrainian politician

- Богдан Бойко
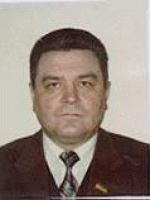
- Official portrait, 1998

Governor of Ternopil Oblast
- In office 7 September 1996 – 20 April 1998
- Preceded by: Borys Kosenko
- Succeeded by: Vasyl Vovk

Chairman of the Ternopil Oblast Council
- In office April 1992 – June 1994
- Preceded by: Vasyl Oliynyk
- Succeeded by: Borys Kosenko

People's Deputy of Ukraine
- In office 15 May 1990 – 14 May 2002
- Preceded by: Position established (1990); Mykhailo Matsialko (1994)
- Succeeded by: Mykhailo Ratushnyi (1994); Constituency abolished (1998)
- Constituency: Ternopil Oblast, No. 360 (1990–1994); Ternopil Oblast, No. 361 (1994–1998); People's Movement of Ukraine, No. 7 (1998–2002)

Personal details
- Born: 29 September 1954 (age 71) Pidiarkiv, Ukrainian SSR, Soviet Union (now Ukraine)
- Party: People's Movement of Ukraine
- Education: University of Lviv

Bohdan Fedorovych Boyko (Ukrainian: Богдан Федорович Бойко; born 29 September 1954) is a Ukrainian politician who formerly served as a People's Deputy of Ukraine from 1990 to 2002 as a member of the People's Movement of Ukraine. He was also a candidate in 2004 Ukrainian presidential election, nominated by the Movement of Ukrainian Patriots. In 2000, he formed a third faction within the People's Movement of Ukraine aimed at reconciling the differences between two other opposing factions.

== Early life ==
He was born on 29 September 1954 in the village of Pidiarkiv, in the western Ukrainian Lviv Oblast in what was then the Soviet Union.

In 1976, he graduated from the Faculty of Economics at Ivan Franko Lviv State University, thus qualifying him for the profession of economists. Afterwards, from 1979 to 1982, he was a graduate student within the Department of Political Economy at his alma mater. In 1982, he received his Candidate of Sciences (equivalent to PhD) which was entitled "Efficiency of commodity turnover of means of production in the period of developed socialism".

=== Career ===
Immediately after receiving his Candidate of Sciences, he worked as an assistant professor for political economy at the Lviv National Environmental University. In 1986, he transferred to the Ternopil Volodymyr Hnatiuk National Pedagogical University to work as a senior lecturer there. He entered politics in 1990, becoming the 1st Deputy Chairman of the Ternopil Oblast Council as a member of the People's Movement of Ukraine, a position he held during the collapse of the Soviet Union, until 15 January 1992 when he became Chairman of the Executive Committee and Regional Council of Ternopil Oblast (a position he still holds currently)

In addition to this, from 1992 to 1994, he was Chairman of the Ternopil Regional Council of People's Deputies. He finally from 1996 to 1998 was Governor of Ternopil Oblast. In addition, during this time, from 1995 to 1999, he was Deputy Chairman of the People's Movement of Ukraine and from 1995 to 1997 also was the Acting Chairman and later Chairman of the Secretariat of the People's Movement of Ukraine.
