= Mykola Zaludyak =

Ukrainian politician

- Микола Залудяк
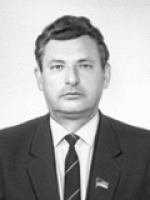
- Official portrait, 1990

Governor of Poltava Oblast
- In office 7 July 1995 – 3 June 1998
- Succeeded by: Oleksandr Kolesnikov
- In office 31 March 1992 – 2 September 1994

People's Deputy of Ukraine
- In office 15 May 1990 – 16 June 1992
- Preceded by: Position established
- Succeeded by: Hryhoriy Omelchenko
- Constituency: Poltava Oblast, Kriukivskyi

Personal details
- Born: 2 April 1941 Vendychany, Ukrainian SSR, Soviet Union (now Ukraine)
- Died: 30 December 2010 (aged 69) Poltava, Ukraine

Mykola Ivanovych Zaludyak (Ukrainian: Микола Іванович Залудяк; 2 April 1941 – 30 December 2010) was a Ukrainian politician and the first secretary (mayor) of Kremenchuk city committee of Communist Party of Ukraine. He was a member of first convocation of the Verkhovna Rada.
