= Governor of Chernihiv Oblast =

Chief executive of Chernihiv Oblast, Ukraine

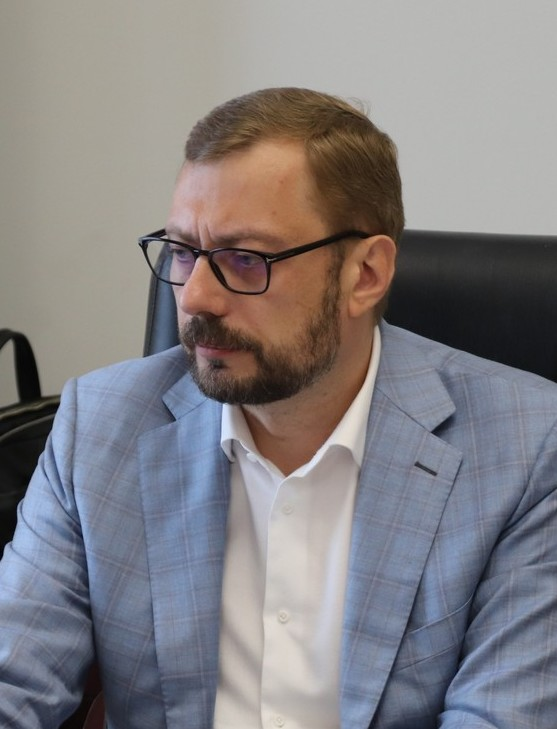
- Incumbent; Vyacheslav Chaus since 4 August 2021
- Residence: Chernihiv
- Inaugural holder: Valentyn Melnychuk
- Formation: March 23, 1992 as Presidential representative of Ukraine
- Website: Government of Chernihiv Oblast

The governor of Chernihiv Oblast is the head of executive branch for the Chernihiv Oblast.

The office of governor is an appointed position, with officeholders being appointed by the president of Ukraine, on recommendation from the prime minister of Ukraine.

The official residence for the governor is located in Chernihiv. The current governor is Viacheslav Chaus, who was appointed on 4 August 2021 by President Volodymyr Zelenskyy.

== Governors ==
=== Representative of the President ===
- 1992–1994: Valentyn Melnychuk

=== Chairman of the Executive Committee ===
- 1994–1995: Petro Shapoval

=== Heads of the Administration ===
- 1995–1998: Petro Shapoval
- 1998–1999: Mykhailo Kaskevych
- 1999–2002: Mykola Butko
- 2002: Hryhoriy Panchenko (acting)
- 2002–2005: Valentyn Melnychuk
- 2005: Vladyslav Atroshenko
- 2005–2007: Mykola Lavryk
- 2007–2014: Volodymyr Khomenko (acting since 12 October 2007)
- 2014: Volodymyr Ivashko
- 2014–2015: Serhiy Zhurman
- 2015–2018: Valeriy Kulich
- 2018: Yulia Svyrydenko (acting)
- 2018–2019: Oleksandr Mysnyk
- 2019 Nataliia Romanova (acting)
- 2019–2020: Andrii Prokopenko
- 2020–2021: Anna Kovalenko
- 2021–present: Vyacheslav Chaus
