= Bevz =

Bevz is a Ukrainian surname. Notable people with the surname include:

- Mykola Bevz (born 1954), Ukrainian scientist and architect
- Valery Bevz (born 1953), Ukrainian politician

== See also ==
- Bevza
- Belz
