= Mykola Kalashnyk =

Ukrainian government official (born 1990)

- Микола Калашник
- Kalashnyk in 2025

Minister for Recovery, Infrastructure and Transport
- Incumbent
- Assumed office 16 July 2026
- President: Volodymyr Zelenskyy
- Prime Minister: Serhii Koretskyi
- Preceded by: Oleksii Kuleba (under the previous ministerial structure)

Head of the Kyiv Oblast State Administration
- In office 24 March 2025 – 16 July 2026
- President: Volodymyr Zelenskyy
- Prime Minister: Denys Shmyhal; Yulia Svyrydenko
- Preceded by: Ruslan Kravchenko
- Succeeded by: Ruslan Oliinyk (acting); Tymur Tkachenko

Personal details
- Born: Mykola Volodymyrovych Kalashnyk; 22 May 1990 (age 36) Kyiv, Ukrainian SSR, Soviet Union
- Education: Kyiv National University of Trade and Economics; National Academy for Public Administration

Mykola Volodymyrovych Kalashnyk (Ukrainian: Микола Володимирович Калашник; born 22 May 1990) is a Ukrainian government official who has served as Minister for Recovery, Infrastructure and Transport since 16 July 2026. He was head of the Kyiv Oblast State Administration from 24 March 2025 to 16 July 2026. Investigative reporting examined public procurement decisions made during Kalashnyk’s tenure as head of the Kyiv Oblast State Administration, as well as his family’s assets.

== Early life and education ==
Kalashnyk was born in Kyiv on 22 May 1990. He studied at the Ivan Cherniakhovskyi National Defence University of Ukraine and received the rank of junior lieutenant in the reserve in 2011. In 2013, he graduated with honours from the Kyiv National University of Trade and Economics with a master's degree in the management of foreign economic activity. In 2015, he earned the degree of Candidate of Economic Sciences.

In 2018, he graduated with honours from the National Academy for Public Administration with a master's degree in public administration, specialising in regional administration. In 2022, he received the academic title of associate professor in the Department of Marketing, Economics, Management and Administration at the National Academy of Management.

== Career ==
Kalashnyk worked as a customs broker for Vent-Service from 2011 to 2012. From 2012 to 2013, he worked as an economist, an economist specialising in contracts and claims, and a deputy department head at the municipal enterprise responsible for managing and maintaining non-residential property in Kyiv's Darnytskyi District.

He worked for the Darnytskyi District State Administration from 2013 to 2024. Between 2013 and 2017, he served as a chief specialist in municipal property and later headed the department responsible for municipal property and the privatisation of state-owned housing. He was chief of staff from 2017 to 2020 and first deputy head from 2020 to 2024. He also served as acting head from 2022 to 2024.

Kalashnyk became first deputy head of the Kyiv Oblast State Administration on 13 December 2024. He served as acting head from 1 January 2025 until his appointment as head on 24 March 2025. He held the post until 16 July 2026.

On 29 June 2026, he became head of the Kyiv Oblast branch of the Servant of the People party. On 16 July, he joined the government of Prime Minister Serhii Koretskyi as Minister for Recovery, Infrastructure and Transport.

== Procurement reporting ==
=== Shelter contracts in Darnytskyi District ===
In September 2024, Nashi Hroshi reported on possible overpricing in contracts awarded by the education department of the Darnytskyi District State Administration, where Kalashnyk was acting head. For a UAH 143.79 million contract to build a shelter at Kindergarten No. 132, the outlet estimated that the cost of sheet-pile sections and reinforcing steel may have been inflated by about UAH 9.27 million.

In a separate report on a UAH 133.06 million shelter contract for Kindergarten No. 5, the outlet estimated a possible overpayment of about UAH 2.42 million for reinforcing steel. It also raised questions about documentation of the generator's compliance with domestic-content requirements and described an earlier challenge to the procurement before the Antimonopoly Committee of Ukraine.

=== Water infrastructure contracts in Kyiv Oblast ===
On 24 August 2026, Nashi Hroshi reported that the Kyiv Oblast State Administration had awarded contracts totalling about UAH 801 million for water treatment facilities in Fastiv and Bila Tserkva without open tendering. The outlet traced the decision to recommendations by emergency management commissions, including a regional commission chaired by Kalashnyk on 2 June 2026. The commission had called for the work to be completed before the 2026–27 heating season. The published contracts instead set completion dates of February 2027 in Bila Tserkva and December 2027 in Fastiv. The administration awarded both contracts after Kalashnyk had left the post.

== Financial disclosures ==
According to his 2025 asset declaration, Kalashnyk reported about UAH 1.45 million in salary and UAH 76,000 in insurance payments. His wife, Anastasiia, reported about UAH 305,000 in income. Kalashnyk declared cash holdings of US$24,000, €9,000 and UAH 100,000, as well as about UAH 41,000 in a bank account. His wife declared UAH 100,000 in cash.

Kalashnyk declared a share in a Kyiv apartment and the use of another apartment in the city. His wife declared ownership of three apartments, one in Kropyvnytskyi and two in Kyiv. Kalashnyk also declared a 2017 Mercedes-Benz GLC 300.

=== Commentary on family assets ===
In an August 2026 opinion column for Espreso, Martyna Bohuslavets, head of the anti-corruption organisation Mezha, questioned how the value of the family's assets compared with its income. She discussed apartments owned by Kalashnyk's wife and other relatives, an apartment he used, and the Mercedes-Benz his wife had given him. Bohuslavets estimated the combined value of the assets she discussed at UAH 9.5 million or more. She also compared the car's declared value of UAH 445,000 with her estimate of its cost after auction, shipping and customs clearance.

== Personal life ==
Kalashnyk is married and has a daughter.

== Honours ==
- Winner of the national Best Civil Servant competition (2016).
- Certificate of Honour of the Cabinet of Ministers of Ukraine (2020).
- Certificate of Honour of the Verkhovna Rada (2021).
- Defence distinctions (2022), including the Medal for Assistance to the Armed Forces of Ukraine, the Medal for Strengthening National Defence, the Commander-in-Chief of the Armed Forces of Ukraine Honour Badge and the Honour Badge for Supporting the Armed Forces.
- Presidential distinction "For the Defence of Ukraine" (2022).
- Order of Merit, third class (26 June 2026), for contributions to Ukrainian statehood and public life, courage and dedication in defending Ukraine's sovereignty and territorial integrity, and conscientious public service.
