= Anatoliy Mazaraki =

Ukrainian economic scientist

Prof. Anatoliy A. Mazaraki
- Анатолій Антонович Мазаракі
- Born: 27 July 1950; Kyiv, Ukrainian SSR, Soviet Union (now Ukraine)
- Education: Kyiv Institute of Trade and Economics
- Known for: Rector of State University of Trade and Economics
- Scientific career
- Workplaces: State University of Trade and Economics
- Thesis: Development and structural reorientation of commodity circulation sphere as a factor of economic growth (1972)

Anatoly A. Mazaraki (born 27 July 1950 in Kyiv, USSR) is a Ukrainian scientist of Greek descent, rector of the State University of Trade and Economics (SUTE). Among his academic achievements belong: the Doctor of Economics (1995), professor (1994), academician of the Academy of Pedagogical Sciences of Ukraine, Honored Scientist of Ukraine (1995) and Honorary Professor (2010). He is author of over 300 scientific publications.

== Biography ==
In 1972, he graduated from the Faculty of Technology of Kyiv Institute of Trade and Economics as engineer. He defended his doctoral thesis Development and structural reorientation of commodity circulation sphere as a factor of economic growth.

Between 1972 and 1975 he worked as junior researcher at the Ukrainian Research Institute of Trade and Catering Ministry of Trade the USSR. In 1975–1984 he held the position of senior engineer, junior researcher, senior researcher at the Council for the Study productive forces of the USSR ANU. In 1984–1987 was Deputy Director of Research of the National Institute of Design and Technology Trade Ministry of Trade of the USSR. In 1987–1988 he worked as Deputy Director General of NGO "Torhprohres" the Ministry of Trade of the USSR. In 1988–1991, respectively – scientific secretary, assistant professor of economics trade, Dean of the Faculty of Commerce and Economics, Vice-Chancellor of the Kyiv Institute of Trade and Economics. Since 1991 he has named as rector of that Institute/University.

Chairman of the specialized council on Trade and Management SAC Ukraine, head of scientific-methodical commission on trade specialties Ministry of Education and Science of Ukraine, academician of the Ukrainian Academy of Sciences for National Progress (1992), Ukrainian Academy original ideas (1995), a member of the New York Academy of Sciences (1995), the International Academy of Higher Education (Moscow, 1996).

The Scientific Council of KNUTE through its resolution on 24 February 2010 awarded Mazaraki by title of "Honorary Professor of KNUTE", for his exceptional personal contribution to the development of the university, enhance its credibility in scientific community and for his training of highly qualified specialists of teaching staff.

=== Family ===
His wife Irina (1955) is an economist; daughter Nataliya (1980) is associate professor of the Department of Commercial Law of KNUTE.

== Awards and honors ==
- Order of Prince Yaroslav the Wise V Class (27 June 2013) – for personal contribution to nation-building, socio-economic, scientific-technical, cultural and educational development of Ukraine, significant employment gains and professionalism.
- Order of Merit I Class (2 October 2004) – for his outstanding contribution to the development of national education, many years of fruitful pedagogical and scientific activities on the occasion of the Day of Education.
- Order of Merit II Class (14 July 2000) – for his outstanding contribution to the development of national education, training highly qualified specialists, many years of fruitful scientific and pedagogical activity.
- Order of Merit III Class (23 January 1998) – for outstanding achievements in work, professionalism.
- Honored Scientist of Ukraine (28 November 1995) – for his significant contribution to the development of national education, new teaching methods and education of youth.
- State Prize of Ukraine in Science and Technology 2012 – for the work "Innovative technologies increase the efficiency of food production" (as part of the team).
- Medal "In Commemoration of the 1500th Anniversary of Kyiv" (1982).
- Diploma of the Cabinet of Ministers of Ukraine (2000).
- Commemorative medal "10 years of Independence of Ukraine".
- Breastplate "Petro Mohyla" Ministry of Education and Science of Ukraine (2005).
- Has the Order "Academic Palm" (2006, France) and other foreign government awards.

== Works ==
- Modern problems of regional trade development (1994)
- The development of trade in the social infrastructure in conditions of market economy (1994)
- The world market of goods and services: Structure (1996, co-author)
- Consumer protection, social and legal aspects (2002)
- Economics of commercial enterprise (1999, co-author)
- Political science (2002, co-author)
- Regulation of foreign economic activity in Ukraine (2003, co-author)
