= Svitlana Bevza =

Ukrainian fashion designer

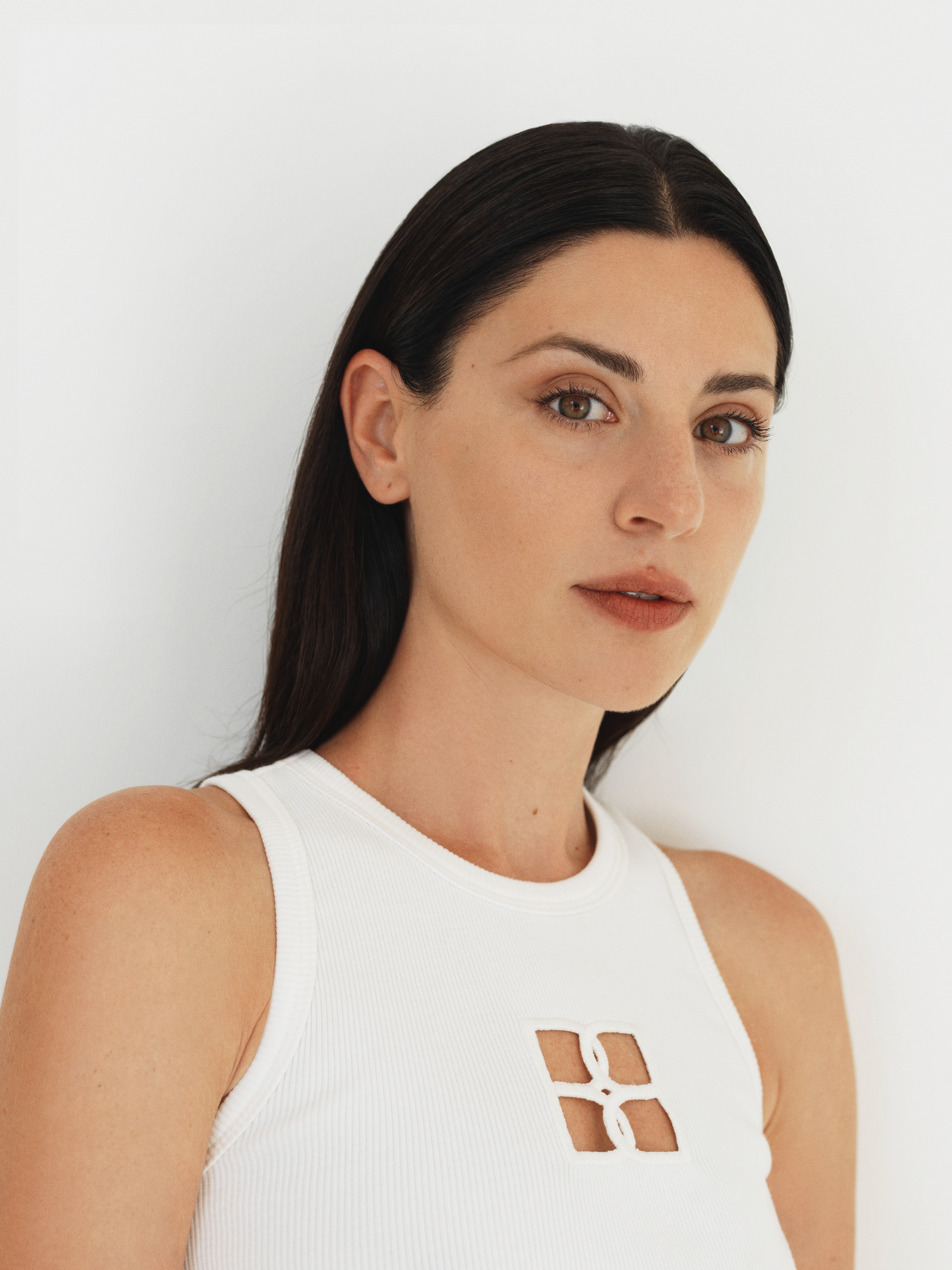

Svitlana Bevza (Ukrainian: Світлана Бевза) is a Ukrainian fashion designer. She is the founder and creative director of BEVZA.

== Biography ==
Svitlana Bevza was born in Kyiv. She graduated from Kyiv National University of Trade and Economics and Kyiv National University of Technologies and Design.

In May 2013, Svitlana won the nomination "Best Designer of Women's Clothing" of the Best Fashion Awards.

In 2014, BEVZA became the first Ukrainian brand to reach the finals of Vogue Talents in Milan.

In November 2018, she received the award "Designer of the Year in Ukraine" from the Elle Style Awards.

== Family ==
She is married to Volodymyr Omelyan former Minister of Infrastructure of Ukraine, and has a son and a daughter.
