= Dmytro Nazarenko =

Dmytro Nazarenko may refer to:

- Dmytro Nazarenko (swimmer) (born 1980), Ukrainian-born, Turkish Olympic swimmer
- Dmytro Nazarenko (footballer) (born 1987), Ukrainian soccer player
- Dmytro Nazarenko (politician) (born 1985), Acting Governor of the Kyiv Oblast from 25 January – 10 April 2023
