= State Service of Maritime and River Transport of Ukraine =

Agency of the Ukrainian government

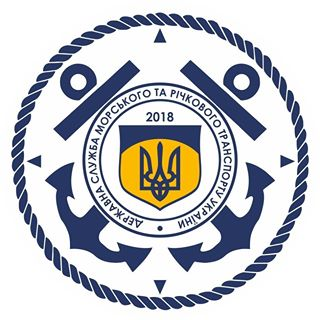

Agency overview
- Formed: September 6, 2017
- Jurisdiction: Ukraine, Kyiv
- Agency executive: Andriy Glazkov, Chairman
- Parent agency: Ukrainian Ministry of Infrastructure
- Website: Official website

The State Service of Maritime and River Transport of Ukraine (Ukrainian: Державна служба морського та річкового транспорту України) (shortened to Maritime Administration) is an agency of the Ukrainian government under the Ministry of Infrastructure whose activities are aimed at implementing state policy in the field of sea and river transport of merchant shipping, navigation on inland waterways, navigation and hydrographic support of navigation, as well as in the field of safety in sea and river transport.

The head office is in Kyiv (25 Preobrazhenska, Kyiv, 03110, Ukraine). State Service of Maritime and River Transport of Ukraine. Retrieved on 6 September 2017.

== History of creation ==
The central executive body with this name was established in 2010 simultaneously with the formation of the Ministry of Infrastructure of Ukraine through the reorganization of the Ministry of Transport and Communications of Ukraine.

In 2011, through the reorganization of the State Service of Maritime and River Transport of Ukraine, its successor was created - the State Inspectorate of Ukraine for Safety at Sea and River Transport (Ukrmorrechinspektsiya) as the central executive.

On September 10, 2014, the Resolution of the Cabinet of Ministers of Ukraine No. 442 was adopted, which abolished the State Inspectorate of Ukraine for Safety in Sea and River Transport. Its successor is the State Service of Ukraine for Transport Safety.

At the end of September 2016, the Minister of Infrastructure Vladimir Omelyan proposed a document on the creation of the Maritime Administration for approval by the Cabinet of Ministers. He also announced a large-scale reform of the maritime industry, which included the reform of the Seaport Authority.

In January 2017, the reform was launched. The impetus for this was that the Administration of the Seaports of Ukraine, according to the minister, in 2016 remained a model of inefficiency, corruption and abuse. A full-fledged reform provided for the creation of the Maritime Administration, which was to take over all the tasks of the USPA.

The State Service of Maritime and River Transport of Ukraine was created and the regulation on it was approved by the Resolution of the Cabinet of Ministers of Ukraine dated September 6, 2017.

On April 11, 2018, Dmitry Petrenko was appointed its chairman for a period of five years with a probationary period of six months. Released from office on October 20, 2019.

On August 22, the Cabinet of Ministers of Ukraine made a decision to fully launch the work of the State Service of Maritime and River Transport.

On October 9, 2020, the Cabinet of Ministers of Ukraine made a decision to temporarily assign the duties of the head of the Maritime Administration to Andrey Glazkov.

== Scope ==
The main tasks of the Maritime Administration are:

fulfillment of certain functions for the implementation of state policy in the areas of: sea and river transport; merchant shipping; navigation on inland waterways; navigation and hydrographic support of navigation; safety in sea and river transport (except for the safety of navigation of vessels of the fishing industry fleet); implementation of state supervision (control) over the safety of sea and river transport, merchant shipping, shipping on inland waterways, navigation and hydrographic support of navigation (except for vessels of the fishing industry fleet); provision of administrative services in the field of sea and river transport; And so on.

The Maritime Administration exercises its powers directly and through territorial bodies.
