= Maksym Burbak =

Ukrainian politician

- Максим Бурбак
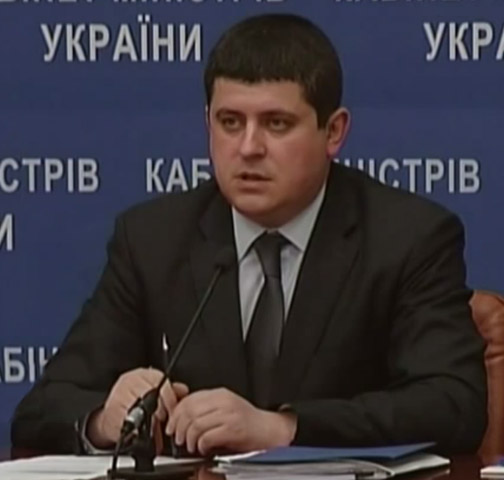
- Burbak in 2014

3rd Minister of Infrastructure of Ukraine
- In office 27 February 2014 – 2 December 2014
- President: Oleksandr Turchynov (acting); Petro Poroshenko
- Prime Minister: Arseniy Yatsenyuk
- Preceded by: Volodymyr Kozak
- Succeeded by: Andriy Pyvovarsky

People's Deputy of Ukraine
- In office 12 December 2012 – 27 August 2019
- Preceded by: Artem Semeniuk (2014)
- Succeeded by: Valeriy Bozhyk (2019)
- Constituency: Batkivshchyna, No. 43 (2012–2014); Chernivtsi Oblast, No. 204 (2014–2019)

Personal details
- Born: 13 January 1976 (age 50) Chernivtsi, Ukrainian SSR
- Party: People's Front
- Other political affiliations: Batkivshchyna; Front for Change
- Education: Chernivtsi University

Maksym Yuriiovich Burbak (Ukrainian: Максим Юрійович Бурбак; born 13 January 1976) is a Ukrainian politician who briefly served as Minister of Infrastructure in the First Yatsenyuk government. He was a People's Deputy of Ukraine from 2012 until 2019, first as a member of the party Batkivshchyna, then as a member of the People's Front. In July 2015 he was elected parliamentary leader of the People's Front parliamentary faction.

Burbak is President of the NGO Interregional Agricultural Society (Chernivtsi).

== Education ==
In 1998 Burbak graduated from the Faculty of Law Chernivtsi National University with a specialty in jurisprudence.

== Career ==
- 1998–2005 – commercial activities.
- 2006–2008 – Deputy Director of "Fintrast", Chernivtsi.
- From July 2008 – Acting Director of "Bucovina Auto Alliance", Chernivtsi.
- 2010–2012 – Member of the Chernivtsi Oblast Council, the head of the "Front for Change".

As a former member of the party Front for Change, he led the Chernivtsi regional organization.

In the 2012 parliamentary election Burbak was elected for the party Batkivshchyna. He was Chairman of the Subcommittee on the development strategy of the customs policy of free trade and economic integration of the Parliamentary Committee on Taxation and Customs Policy.

On 27 February 2014 Burbak was appointed Minister of Infrastructure of Ukraine in the first Yatsenyuk Government of Prime Minister Arseniy Yatsenyuk; he did not return in the second Yatsenyuk Government.

In the 2014 parliamentary election Burbak was elected to parliament again as People's Front candidate in Ukraine's 204th electoral district (Chernivtsi Oblast) with 24.22% of the votes. On 3 July 2015 Burbak was elected parliamentary leader of the People's Front parliamentary faction.

In the 2019 Ukrainian parliamentary election Burbak lost his reelection bid as an independent candidate in single-seat constituency 204 (Chernivtsi Oblast).

== Personal life ==
Burbak is married with two children.
