= Volodymyr Omelyan =

Ukrainian diplomat and politician (born 1979)

- Володимир Омелян
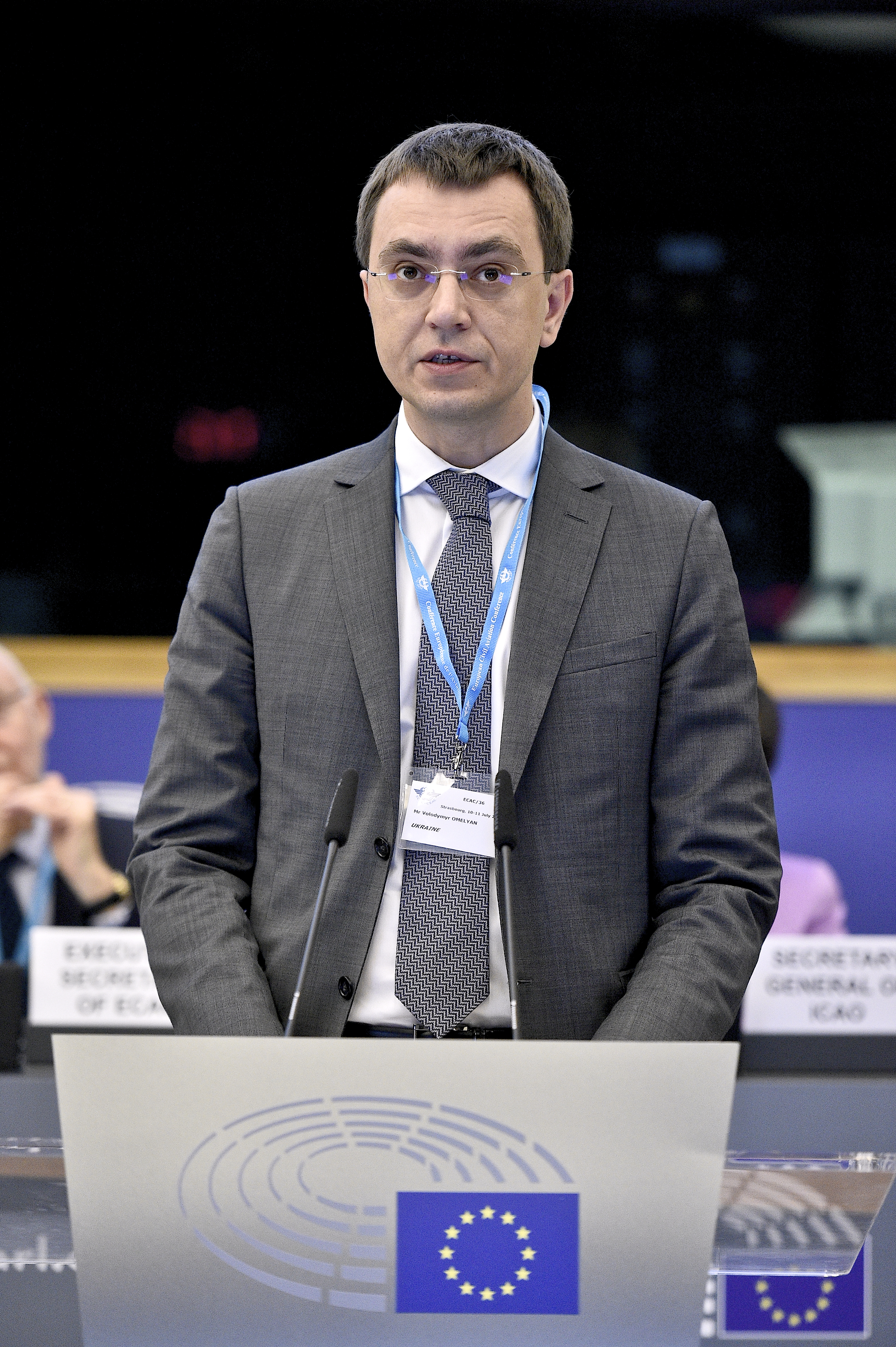
- Omelyan in 2018

5th Minister of Infrastructure
- In office 14 April 2016 – 29 August 2019
- President: Petro Poroshenko; Volodymyr Zelenskyy
- Prime Minister: Volodymyr Groysman
- Preceded by: Andriy Pyvovarsky
- Succeeded by: Vladyslav Krykliy

Personal details
- Born: 30 January 1979 (age 47) Lviv, Ukrainian SSR, Soviet Union (now Ukraine)
- Party: People's Front
- Education: University of Lviv; Lviv Polytechnic
- Occupation: Diplomat; politician

Volodymyr Volodymyrovych Omelyan (Ukrainian: Володимир Володимирович Омелян; born 30 January 1979) is a Ukrainian diplomat and politician. He is a former Ukraine's infrastructure minister in the government of Volodymyr Groysman.

== Early life and career ==
Born 30 January 1979 in the west Ukrainian city of Lviv, Omelyan graduated from the University of Lviv in 2000 and the Lviv Polytechnic in 2001. He has a degree in finance, international relations, economics and entrepreneurship.

From 2000 until 2008 Omelyan had a career in the Ministry of Foreign Affairs of Ukraine. Following this, he worked in the embassy of Ukraine in Vienna, Austria, . and then switched to the Ministry of Environmental Protection for a period of two years. Then he returned to the Foreign Ministry. From 2012 to 2014 was a top civil servant in Ukraine's Ministry of Finance. Omelyan served as Deputy Minister of Infrastructure from 2014 to 2016.

== Minister of Infrastructure of Ukraine ==
On 14 April 2016 Omelyan was appointed Minister of Infrastructure of Ukraine on the quota of the People's Front. On 29 August 2019, following the installation of the Honcharuk Government without People's Front, Vladyslav Krykliy replaced Omelyan as infrastructure minister.

Upon assuming the post of Minister of Infrastructure of Ukraine, Volodymyr Omelyan began the process of increasing the pace of transport infrastructure reforms in Ukraine. His focus has been to actively support a free market approach to transport services, boost investments by leading global companies, digitalization of infrastructure, encourage innovation as well as advocating for breakthrough ideas in the transport sector. The Ministry of Infrastructure, together with state enterprises reporting to the Ministry, accounts for roughly 25% of all governmental purchases. By using the ProZorro system for procurement, the Ministry has saved more than ₴9 billion in infrastructure tenders over the last two years. At the same time, the competitiveness index of purchases and absence of monopoly in the Ministry of Infrastructure is on 30-50% higher than the national average.

Volodymyr Omelyan is a member of the National Investment Council of Ukraine.

=== Aviation sector ===
Conducted in 2016, the reform of the State Aviation Service of Ukraine introduced the principles of transparency and fair competition. As a result, since 2016, the air market has been growing at a record pace - 30% per year. Volodymyr Omelyan initiated the launch in Ukraine of the biggest low-cost airline in Europe - Ryanair. In 2017 the passenger traffic carried by Ukrainian airlines increased by 29.6% and the passengers flow through the Ukrainian airports grew up to 28.8%. Since 2015 the number of air lines that are served by low-cost carriers has doubled – from 18 to 38 routes. Kyiv's Boryspil International Airport reached the highest indicators in its history – for one year, the number of passengers increased by 2 million and reached the level of 10,45 million passengers including 3 million of transfer passengers attracted from foreign markets. In 2017, Ukraine successfully passed the audit of the International Civil Aviation Organization (ICAO).

Lviv's Danylo Halytskyi International Airport traffic also grew serving more than 1 million passengers in 2017, the first time since 1991. Passenger traffic through Ukraine's airports in January – June 2018 increased by 26%. In spring 2018, the Ryanair entered the Ukrainian market and began to sell flight tickets at a price from 10 euros. A national airline SkyUp was established. It carries out budget transportation and has already ordered from Boeing company five ultra-modern airplanes of model Boeing 737 Max.

Work on modernizing and expanding service at regional airport continues. The construction of the runway in Odesa airport has begun and this will turn Odesa into a south-hub. On 10 July 2018 UkSATSE and European Aviation Safety Agency (EASA) signed Certification of UkSATSE's services on their compliance with EU norms and this opened the way for the restoration of the full-fledged work of the Uzhhorod Airport.

=== Automobile and Urban Transport ===
Important steps have been taken in the reformation of passenger bus traffic, in particular: the introduction of a competition for interregional bus routes on an applicant's basis; compulsory use on urban and suburban routes buses adapted for the transportation of people with disabilities; advantages on the competition for carriers offering a low-floor buses, electric buses, buses with a higher category of environmental friendliness (Euro 3 - Euro 6); introduction of the electronic register of bus routes and others. The ultimate goal of the bus reform is to ensure the highest level of passenger safety, completely liberalize market and create all conditions for the work of responsible carriers, to replace the jitneys ("mashrutki") with Neoplan buses or their analogues, to create a convenient network of routes and modern bus stations.

In 2017, a new electronic system for the transparent distribution of permits issued by the European Conference of Ministers of Transport (ECMT) was introduced, which increased the number of ECMT permits by 7%, carriers by 16% and vehicles by 24%. The Law of Ukraine was adopted to introduce modern systems of payment for fares and an electronic ticket in urban passenger transport by local self-government bodies. On 12 April 2017, the Financial Agreement (Project "Urban Public Transport of Ukraine") was ratified between Ukraine and the European Investment Bank, which provides the attraction of 200 million euros of credit funds for the development of urban electric transport in Zaporizhia, Chernihiv, Mykolayiv, Ivano-Frankivsk, Lviv, Ternopil, Sumy, Kharkiv, Lutsk, Odesa and Kyiv. On 6 May 2017, the President of Ukraine signed this law.

=== Road sector ===
From 2016 to 2017, more than 3000 km of roads were repaired and built, which is more than in the previous 10 years. In 2018 a record 4000 km of highways are planned to be rehabilitated. Reform of road sector of Ukraine was carried out - Ukravtodor was decentralized and the Road Fund of Ukraine was created. Beginning 1 January 2018, Ukravtodor is responsible for 47 thousand km of state roads of national and international importance. 123,000 kilometres of roads were transferred to local authorities with appropriate financing. The maintenance and construction of regional roads will be funded by 35% of the Road Fund which is proportionally distributed between the regions. In 2018 this amounted to ₴11.5 billion for regional roads. In total, ₴32.6 billion was budgeted for road reconstruction nationally. For the first time in the history, Ukraine has designated source of financing for the repair and construction of highways. Beginning in 2018, all roads must be built with a 5-10 year warranty and in accordance with the CoST standards.

=== Road safety ===
The newly established Road Fund also allocates for the first time, 5% per year for road safety. The Ministry of Infrastructure developed and the government approved a three-year program for increasing the level of road safety in Ukraine through 2020. The three-year "500-500-1000" programme provides about ₴8 billion on the equipment of 500 U-turn islands, 500 roundabouts and 1,000 illuminated pedestrian crossings. 109 sites accounting for the largest concentration of traffic accidents nationally have been identified and work is ongoing to make them safe. Within the framework of the Program, the goal is to reduce road deaths by 30% by 2020. The improvement of road safety and efforts to reduce the destruction of roads by overweight trucks, will be facilitated by the use of 78 new mobile weight control systems and the establishment of 10 stationary Weight-in-Motion systems (WIM). More than 300 WiM-complexes are planned to be installed in the future.

On 9 July 2018, a financial agreement was signed between Ukraine and the European Investment Bank to allocate 75 million euros towards the improvement of road safety in six Ukrainian cities: Kyiv, Dnipro, Kharkiv, Lviv, Odesa and Kamyanets-Podilsky.

=== Waterborne transport ===
Volodymyr Omelyan initiated an entry into the maritime industry the world's leaders companies - Hutchison Ports and DP World. He stands for the transfer of ports into concession and development of public-private partnership. The reform in the maritime industry and inland water transport industry has begun. The Maritime Administration was created and the Marine Doctrine was developed. In 2017, Ukraine's seaports transshipped almost 133 million tons of cargo, which is 0.9% more than in 2016. Since 1 January 2018, the port charges have been reduced by 20%. Large-scale dredging works are conducted with the participation of leading international companies. Financing for the reconstruction of the Dnipro locks is provided from the EU budget support fund in the amount of ₴105 million. In spring 2018, Ukraine successfully passed the audit of the International Maritime Organization.

=== Railway sector ===
The corporatization of Ukrzaliznytsia has been completed. The supervisory board was created in 2018 with Sevki Acuner, the former director of the European Bank for Reconstruction and Development in Ukraine as its appointed Head. On 24 February 2018, at the initiative of Minister Volodymyr Omelyan, an agreement was signed between PJSC "Ukrzaliznytsia" and the US company General Electric on the modernization of the locomotive fleet and supply of new locomotives worth $1 billion. This will create more than a thousand jobs and implement modern production technologies. The first 30 locomotives provides for the localization of production at the level of 10%, in the future, localization should increase to 40%. The construction of Beskyd Tunnel was finished and movement of trains began on 24 May 2018. The Ukraine-Europe railway network was expanded up to 14 railway routes.

=== Digital infrastructure, electric cars and Hyperloop in Ukraine ===
Volodymyr Omelyan has advocated that Ukraine can be one of the international leaders in technological advancements. His goal has been to make Ukraine a platform for the development of cutting-edge technologies in transport, increase mobility by developing a single electronic ticket for all types of transport, expanding broadband internet, using big data in the traffic control system and smart-technology, and increasing the share of electric cars up to 50%. In 2017, Ukraine was one of the top 5 countries internationally in the development of the electric car market, ahead of the US, the Netherlands, and Japan. Beginning 1 January 2018, the VAT and excise taxes on the imports of electric cars in Ukraine have been canceled for one year, reducing their cost by roughly 17%. The Minister of Infrastructure has been actively promoting the idea of introducing a hyperloop high-speed transport system in Ukraine. On 22 February 2018 the Ministry of Infrastructure signed a Memorandum on the launch of the transport innovation project HypeUA for the development of the newest transport technologies in Ukraine. On 14 June 2018 Volodymyr Omelyan, together with Dirk Ahlborn, the chief executive officer of Hyperloop Transportation Technologies, met and signed the Memorandum of Cooperation. In September 2019 the (new) Minister of Infrastructure of Ukraine, Vladyslav Krykliy, cancelled the Ukrainian (according to him "absurd") Hyperloop project.

=== Postal services ===
Ukrposhta is on a path to corporate viability. Corporatization has been complete. The wages of employees are gradually increasing and an investment program, for which ₴750 million was allocated in 2017, is being implemented. Over a two-year period, the Ukrposhta has purchased over 500 new cars and 8300 computers. A program of modernizing its infrastructure and computerization of departments is being introduced. The construction of the first automated sorting complex began in the Lviv region.

All procurements are carried out only through the ProZorro system which has resulted in considerable cost savings. The express delivery service has been restarted, and new services "Ukrposhta Standart" and "Ukrposhta SmartBox" have been launched. Ukrposhta received permission to make money transfers.

=== International cooperation and development strategy ===
Volodymyr Omelyan believes that Ukraine should become an international transport hub and a bridge between Europe and Asia as soon as possible by embracing transportation infrastructure innovation and development. On 22 October 2017, he signed a Memorandum of Understanding with Andrzej Adamczyk, the Minister of Infrastructure and Construction of the Republic of Poland providing for further cooperation within the framework of the international infrastructure project Via Carpatia in addition to discussing the implementation of the GO (Gdansk- Odesa) Highway project. According to the results of the Brussels Eastern Partnership Summit in November 2017, Ukraine was added to the indicative maps of the TEN-T. 20 February 2018 saw a historical first, with Volodymyr Omelyan and Henrik Hololei, the Director General for Mobility and Transport of the European Commission participating in the High-Level Transport Dialogue Ukraine-EU, in Kyiv The meeting emphasized the necessity of the speedy adoption of draft laws by Ukraine toward fulfillment of its obligations under the Association Agreement for European integration.

=== Drive Ukraine 2030 ===
On 30 May 2018, the Government of Ukraine approved the National Transport Strategy of Ukraine 2030 ("Drive Ukraine 2030") which, for the first time provided a perspective vision for the development of the transport industry and infrastructure for the next 12 years. According to Volodymyr Omelyan, Drive Ukraine 2030 is a critical guideline for the creation of a new infrastructure reality and integration of Ukraine into European and global logistics systems.

The strategy provides 90% renewal of infrastructure, 50 operating airports, 10 highways and an extensive network of modern roads, digital infrastructure, introduction of Hyperloop technology, complete renewal of the railway rolling stock, and a number of other innovations.

Drive Ukraine 2030 has the full support from the EU. Violeta Bulc, the European Commissioner for Mobility and Transport and Ambassador Hugues Mingarelli, the Head of the EU Delegation to Ukraine, have both stated that the Ministry's vision of the infrastructure development is fully in line with the policy of the European Union.

== Corruption investigation ==
On 28 March 2023 the Supreme Court of Ukraine, the country's highest court, acquitted Omelyan in a case concerning allegations of illegal enrichment and inaccurate asset declarations. Omelyan later stated that in 2020 Andriy Yermak,Office of the President of Ukraine, had discussed with him the possibility of resolving the legal proceedings if Omelyan refrained from publicly criticising President Volodymyr Zelenskyy.

== Personal life ==
Volodymyr Omelyan has one son from his first marriage. Omelyan's second wife is Ukrainian fashion designer Svitlana Bevza; the couple has two children.

Political offices
Preceded by Andriy Pyvovarsky	Minister of Infrastructure of Ukraine; 2016–2019	Succeeded by Vladyslav Krykliy
