= Volodymyr Kozak =

Ukrainian politician (born 1959)

- Володимир Козак
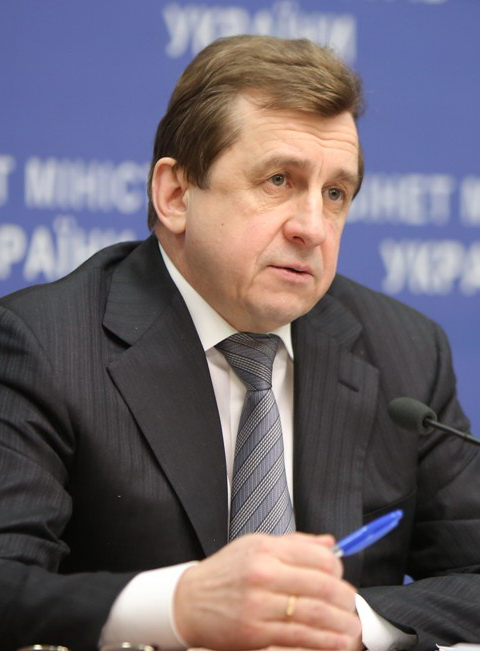
- Kozak in 2014

2nd Minister of Infrastructure
- In office 24 December 2012 – 27 February 2014
- President: Viktor Yanukovych
- Prime Minister: Mykola Azarov
- Preceded by: Borys Kolesnikov
- Succeeded by: Maksym Burbak

Personal details
- Born: 9 August 1959 (age 67) Polohy, Zaporizhzhia Oblast, Ukrainian SSR, Soviet Union
- Spouse: Olga Tomivna (m. 1960)
- Children: Anastasia
- Education: Dnipro National University of Rail Transport
- Profession: Politician

Volodymyr Vasyliovych Kozak (Ukrainian: Волод́имир Вас́ильович Ко́зак; born 9 August 1959) is a Ukrainian politician who became the second Minister of Infrastructure from 2012 to 2014. He is a millionaire, and according to his income statement, his net worth was 2,031,899 hryvnias in 2012.

== Early life and education ==
Kozak was born on 9 August 1959 in the village of Polohy, Ukraine SSR, and graduated from the Dnipro Institute of Railway Transport Engineers, specialty of operation of railway transport, qualification for engineer of communication routes for the operation of railways.

== Career ==
Prior to Kozak's ministerial role, he had held several early positions such as a duty officer, station duty officer, station dispatcher at the Yasynuvata Station of the Donetsk railway in 1981; the Deputy Head of the Avdiivka Station in 1983; Head of department in the Donetsk railway in 1985; Head of Department and Head of Transportation Service in the Donetsk Railway in 1990; deputy head of the railway and head of the road transport management center in the Donetsk railway in 1996; the general director of Lemtrans LLC in 2000; the general director of the Interregional Industrial Union corporation, 99% of which is owned by Lemtrans.

Kozak would later become the general director of the State Administration of Railway Transport of Ukraine from 23 August 2006 to 8 November 2007; the People's Deputy of Ukraine of the 6th convocation of the Verkhovna Rada from the Party of Regions in November 2007; chairman of the Committee of the Verkhovna Rada of Ukraine on Transport and Communications; the general director of the State Administration of Railway Transport of Ukraine on 21 March 2011. Only until 24 December 2012, Kozak was appointed to the position of Minister of Infrastructure by the Decree of the President of Ukraine No. 735/2012 "On the Appointment of V. Kozak as Minister of Infrastructure of Ukraine". On 27 February 2014, he was dismissed from the post of minister in connection with the formation of a new composition of the Cabinet of Ministers of Ukraine.

== Controversies ==
=== Ukrzaliznytsia corruption ===
When Volodymyr Kozak was the general director of Ukrzaliznytsia, he was frequently accused of breaking the rules around tenders. In particular, Ukrtrans Trading House LLC, a company connected to Rinat Akhmetov and Anton Prygodskyi's corporate enterprises, received railway tenders worth a total of 3.049 billion hryvnias. Promexposervice LLC, owned by a Dniprodzerzhinsk (Dnipropetrovsk Oblast) resident, won four Ukrzaliznytsia tenders back-to-back totaling 2.16 million hryvnias in the beginning of 2012. Nonetheless, there were still deals from PE Luhanskdorkomplekt at a nearly twofold lower cost. Based on the outcomes of tenders, SE Ukrainian State Center for the Operation of Specialized Wagons entered a number of agreements for the acquisition of metal products on 18 January 2012, for a total of 357.41 million hryvnias. With the amount of 341.60 million hryvnias, Ukrtrans Trading House LLC committed to provide sheet and profiled metal products.

For the supply of 43 electric locomotives of the 2C10 series made by Uralski Lokomotivy LLC in Russia to the Lviv Railways, SE Ukrzaliznytsia signed a lease agreement in February 2012. At the tender, an electric locomotive typically cost around 113 million hryvnias. Yet, Borys Kolesnikov, the deputy prime minister for infrastructure at the time, claimed in 2011 that purchasing Russian 2EC10 electric locomotives would only cost Ukraine 60 million hryvnias.

Hyundai passenger train pauses and breakdowns abruptly increased in frequency in December 2012. Analysts referred to this situation as a provocation against Borys Kolesnikov, the Ukraine's minister of infrastructure and then vice prime minister. Boris Kolesnikov stated in an interview with the weekly Dzerkalo Tyzhnia before to his resignation that Volodymyr Kozak, the head of Ukrzaliznytsia, ought to be held accountable for the breakdowns of Hyundai trains. And he said that one of the Party of Regions' members was in charge of the effort to damage his reputation. In 2013, SE Ukrzaliznytsia lowered the volume of freight transportation by 5.6% (to 224.4 billion t/km) and transit transportation by 18.8% as a result of ineffective state administration to 34,030,000 tonnes (33,490,000 long tons; 37,510,000 short tons). In general, 443,600,000 tonnes (436,600,000 long tons; 489,000,000 short tons) of goods were transported by Ukrainian railroads in 2013, which is 3% less than in 2012. Long customs lines and non-competitive tariffs were to blame for the decline. Because of this, the bulk of shippers have turned to the Baltic nations, where it costs $4 less to export 1 ton of coal by rail than it does in Ukraine.

=== Aviation corruption ===
To prepare for the EuroBasket 2015 tournament, the government would fund the construction of a new runway at the Odesa airport, according to Volodymyr Kozak, who made the announcement in August 2013. This was because the airport's private investors were unable to meet their investment commitments. The private company Odesa Airport Development LLC assumed control of Odesa Airport in July 2011. According to the Odesa City Council's decision dated 8 July 2011, Odesa International Airport LLC was established, with 75% of the shares transferred to Odesa Airport Development LLC, and 25% of the shares fixed in communal ownership. The investor agreed to invest $180 million, create a new airport terminal, and rebuild the runway in exchange for state property. The decision was harshly attacked by the media, which also claimed that Odesa businessmen Boris Kaufman and Oleksandr Granovsky are the company's backers in relation to members of the city council.

The airport's new shareholders failed to uphold their commitments. In August 2013, Ukreximbank committed money for the construction of a new passenger terminal with the backing of the local government, issuing a credit line for Odesa International Airport LLC of $30 million. The state firm Odesa International Airport Construction Directorate was established, and in 2014 it would receive financing from the state budget totaling 1.7 billion hryvnias for the reconstruction of the runway.

== Honours ==
Throughout his career, he has been awarded the following honours;

- Order of Merit Second Class
- Order of Merit Third Class

Political offices
Preceded by Borys Kolesnikov	2nd Minister of Infrastructure; 24 December 2012 – 27 February 2014	Succeeded by Maksym Burbak
