= State Agency of Ukraine in Tourism and Resorts =

Government agency of Ukraine

- Державне агентство України з туризму та курортів

Agency overview
- Formed: 6 April 2011
- Dissolved: 14 January 2015
- Jurisdiction: Government of Ukraine
- Headquarters: Kyiv, Ukraine
- Employees: 43
- Annual budget: ₴960,200 (2019)
- Agency executive: Olena Oleksiivna Shapovalova
- Parent agency: Ministry of Infrastructure
- Website: www.tourism.gov.ua

State Agency of Ukraine in Tourism and Resorts (Ukrainian: Державне агентство України з туризму та курортів) is a government agency under the Ministry of Infrastructure which secured the execution of state policy in the field of tourism and resorts until 2015.

== History ==
State Agency of Ukraine in Tourism and Resorts was established on 6 April 2011 in line with paragraph 1 of the Decree of the President of Ukraine No.370 "Issues of Optimization of the System of Central Executive Bodies." The CMU's resolution No.442 on 10 September 2014, abolished the agency and was finally dissolved in January 2015. The Department of Tourism and Resorts of the Ministry of Economic Development and Trade was founded on 22 July 2016 under the purview of that ministry. According to Cabinet of Ministers (CMU) Resolution No.995, the State Tourism Development Agency has served as the primary executive body responsible for carrying out state policy in the tourism and resort sectors since 4 December 2019. The agency's operations are overseen and coordinated by the Ukrainian Cabinet of Ministers through the Minister of Culture, Youth, and Sport.

== Structure ==
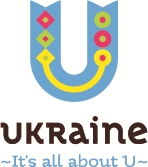
Tourism brand of Ukraine

=== Main bodies ===
The main bodies of State Agency of Ukraine in Tourism and Resorts is as follows:

- Scientific and Technical Council
- Council of representatives of regions in the field of tourism and resorts
- Council of Tourist Cities of Ukraine
- Industry tripartite socio-economic council at the State Tourism Resort

=== Registers ===
- Licensing register of tour operators
- Register of certificates on the establishment of categories for hotels and other facilities designated for the provision of temporary accommodation (accommodation) services

=== Branding ===
The State Agency of Ukraine for Tourism and Resorts used funds from a grant awarded by the German Society for International Cooperation (GIZ) in Ukraine to implement the development of the tourist brand.

== Leadership ==
The agency only saw one single chairman appointment throughout its lifespan.

- Olena Oleksiivna Shapovalova (6 April 2011–16 April 2014)

== See also ==
- Tourism in Ukraine
