= Valeriy Bozhyk =

Ukrainian politician

- Валерій Божик
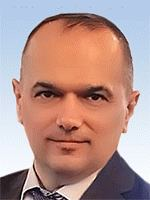
- Official portrait, 2019

People's Deputy of Ukraine
- Incumbent
- Assumed office 27 August 2019
- Preceded by: Maksym Burbak
- Constituency: Chernivtsi Oblast, No. 204

Personal details
- Born: 27 March 1971 (age 55) Kadubivtsi, Ukrainian SSR, Soviet Union (now Ukraine)
- Party: Servant of the People
- Other political affiliations: Independent

Valeriy Ivanovych Bozhyk (Ukrainian: Валерій Іванович Божик; born 27 March 1971) is a Ukrainian lawyer and politician currently serving as a People's Deputy of Ukraine from Ukraine's 204th electoral district.

== Biography ==
Valeriy Ivanovych Bozhyk was born on 27 March 1971 in Kadubivtsi, in Chernivtsi Oblast. He graduated from Chernivtsi University specialising in legal studies. He served as head of the Chernivtsi Oblast Classification and Disciplinary Legal Commission from 2009 to 2011, and held leading positions in Chernivtsi Oblast's law bodies.

In 2010, Bozhyk mounted a campaign for membership in the Chernivtsi City Council, running as a member of Civil Position. He was a successful candidate for People's Deputy of Ukraine from Ukraine's 204th electoral district, representing Servant of the People despite being an independent. He is deputy chairman of the Verkhovna Rada Committee on Legal Policy, as well as a member of Smart Politics.

During the election, Bozhyk acquired attention after his opponent, Maksym Burbak, claimed he held dual citizenship with Romania, something which is illegal in Ukraine. The Central Election Commission told Servant of the People they were investigating the claims. Bozhyk denied that he had dual citizenship, submitting an application to the Romanian consulate in Chernivtsi to confirm his lack of Romanian citizenship.

On 28 May 2020, Bozhyk was diagnosed with COVID-19. He was subsequently placed in isolation.
