= Ruslan Kravchenko =

Ukrainian politician (born 1990)

- Руслан Кравченко
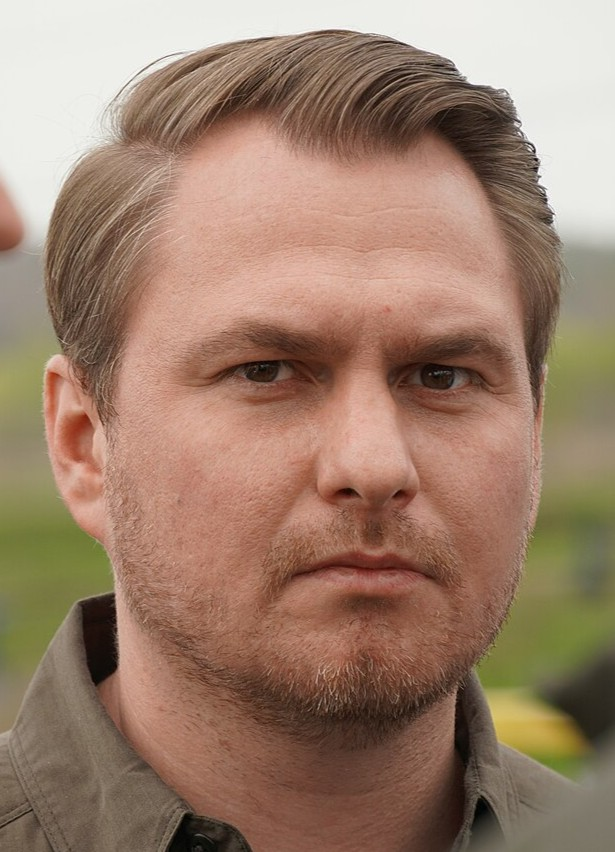
- Kravchenko in 2023

Prosecutor General of Ukraine
- In office 21 June 2025 – 15 September 2026
- Preceded by: Andriy Kostin
- Succeeded by: Anton Kovalskyi

Head of the State Tax Service of Ukraine
- In office 31 December 2024 – 17 June 2025
- Appointed by: Cabinet of Ministers of Ukraine

Governor of Kyiv Oblast
- In office 10 April 2023 – 30 December 2024
- Appointed by: Volodymyr Zelenskyy
- Preceded by: Dmytro Nazarenko (acting)
- Succeeded by: Mykola Kalashnyk (acting)

Head of the Kyiv Oblast Military Administration
- In office 10 April 2023 – 30 December 2024
- Appointed by: Volodymyr Zelenskyy
- Governor: Dmytro Nazarenko (acting)

Head of the Bucha District Prosecutor's Office in Kyiv Oblast
- In office 2021–2023

Personal details
- Born: 14 March 1990 (age 36) Sievierodonetsk, Lugansk Oblast, Ukrainian SSR, Soviet Union

Ruslan Andriiovych Kravchenko (Ukrainian: Руслан Андрійович Кравченко; born 14 March 1990) is a Ukrainian politician and prosecutor, who served as Prosecutor General of Ukraine from 21 June 2025 until he resigned in disgrace on 15 September 2026 after anti-corruption investigators searched his office.

Before this, Kravchenko was Head of the Kyiv Regional Military Administration from April 2023 to December 2024 and Head of the State Tax Service of Ukraine from December 2024 to June 2025.

He was awarded the "Order of Merit", III degree, on 23 August 2022, "for significant achievements in strengthening Ukrainian statehood, courage and dedication in defending the sovereignty and territorial integrity of Ukraine, significant personal contribution to the development of various spheres of public life, defending the national interests of our country, and conscientious performance of professional duty."

== Biography ==
Ruslan Andriiovych Kravchenko was born in 1990 in Sievierodonetsk, Luhansk Oblast, then studying at the Secondary School no. 8 in Sievierodonetsk from 1997 to 2005. From 2005-2007, he continued his studies at the Ivan Bohun Military Lyceum (also known as the Ivan Bohun Military High School) in Kyiv. From 2007 to 2012, he studied at the Military-Law Faculty of the Yaroslav Mudryi National Law University, where he received a master's degree in law and the military rank of "Lieutenant of Justice."

== Career ==
On 15 August 2012, Ruslan Kravchenko was appointed as a prosecutor investigator at the Sevastopol Prosecutor's Office, where he was responsible for ensuring compliance with the laws in the military sphere of the Crimean region of Ukraine. A year later, Kravchenko was promoted to the position of senior investigator, a position he held until the annexation of the Crimea in 2014.

In 2014, he was appointed to the position of senior prosecutor of the Rivne and later Lviv Prosecutor's Office to oversee the observance of laws in the military sphere in the Western region of Ukraine.

From 2015 to 2019, Ruslan Kravchenko had worked at the Main Military Prosecutor's Office of the General Prosecutor's Office of Ukraine in the following positions:

- Prosecutor of the Department of Procedural Guidance;
- Deputy Chief of the Procedural Guidance Department;
- Head of the First Department of Procedural Guidance for Pre-trial Investigations and Support of Public Prosecution in Criminal Proceedings of the Investigation Department of the Administration for Investigation of Crimes Against the Fundamentals of National Security of Ukraine, Peace, Human Security and International Law and Order.

From 2019 to 2020, he had worked as a Deputy Military Prosecutor of the Central Region of Ukraine, and was transferred to the position of Prosecutor of the Department for Procedural Guidance and Supervision over Compliance with Laws in the Conduct of Operational Investigative Activities of the Department for Organization of Procedural Guidance, Supervision over Execution of Court Decisions and in the Conduct of Operational Investigative Activities of the Specialized Prosecutor's Office in the Military and Defense Sphere of the Central Region.

From 2020 to 2021, Ruslan Kravchenko had worked as the Head of the Department of Procedural Guidance in Criminal Proceedings on Crimes in the Field of the Defense Industry of the Specialized Prosecutor's Office in the Military and Defense Spheres of the Office of the General Prosecutor of Ukraine.

In 2021, Ruslan Kravchenko became the Head of the Bucha District Prosecutor's Office in Kyiv Oblast. From 31 March 2022, he has recorded and investigated Russian war crimes in Bucha.

In April 2023, he was appointed as Head of the Kyiv Regional State Administration by the Decree of the President of Ukraine (Volodymyr Zelenskyy) from 10 April 2023, no. 204/2023. He was dismissed from this post by Presidential Decree decree no. 887/2024 on 30 December 2024. The following day the Cabinet of Ministers of Ukraine appointed Kravchenko head of the State Tax Service of Ukraine.

On 17 June 2025, he was approved as Prosecutor General of Ukraine by Verkhovna Rada. On 21 June 2025, he was appointed as Prosecutor General by president Volodymyr Zelenskyy.

Kravchenko resigned on 8 September 2026 after an investigation by the National Anti-Corruption Bureau (NABU) and the Specialized Anti-Corruption Prosecutor's Office (SAPO) discovered a network within his office that was involved in a money-laundering scheme involving profits derived from call centers engaged in financial scams. Soon after, on the night of 13 September 2026, Kravchenko left Ukraine immediately after accusing the chiefs both NABU (Semen Kryvonos) and SAPO (Oleksandr Klymenko) of crimes. President Zelenskyy called for his dismissal. The Ukrainian Anti-Corruption Action Center (ANTAC) claimed Zelenskyy allowed Kravchenko's departure for signing off on accusations against Kryvonos.

== Participation in the Russian-Ukrainian war ==
In 2014-2015, he directly participated in the anti-terrorist operation while performing his duties as a prosecutor of the 33rd Military Prosecutor's Office of the Southern Region of Ukraine (Debaltseve, Artemivsk - since 2016, Bakhmut). He received the status of a participant of military operations.

== Public and professional activities ==
During his service in various positions, Ruslan Kravchenko has been leading a team of prosecutors involved in high-profile criminal investigations:

- As a senior prosecutor, he provided procedural guidance and supported the state prosecution in the criminal proceedings against former President of Ukraine Viktor Yanukovych on the fact of his committing high treason and aiding and abetting in the conduct of an aggressive war. He obtained a guilty verdict and sentenced Yanukovych to 13 years in prison. The verdict was upheld in the appellate and cassation instances.
- Investigated cases related to the Russian aggression against Ukraine in 2014 in Sevastopol and the Autonomous Republic of the Crimea. He ensured the conduct of priority investigative and procedural actions during the military units of the Russian Armed Forces' military aggression against Ukraine in the territory of the Autonomous Republic of the Crimea. The collected materials were used as evidence of the aggressive war against Ukraine.
- Participated in supporting the state prosecution in the criminal proceedings against the servicemen of the General Staff of the Russian Armed Forces Yevhen Yerofeev and Oleksandr Aleksandrov. They were found guilty of waging an aggressive war and committing a terrorist act that caused the death of a person. As a result, the military of the aggressor country sentenced them to 14 years in prison.
- Participated in the proceedings against the authorized representative of the President of the Russian Federation, O. E. Belaventsev. As a result, he was sentenced to 12 years in prison for committing an encroachment on the territorial integrity and inviolability of Ukraine, incitement to treason and waging an aggressive war against Ukraine.
- Worked on the case against high-ranking officials of the Russian Armed Forces - the Minister of Defense of the Russian Federation, the Commander of the Black Sea Fleet and other senior officials of the Russian Armed Forces. They were accused of intentional actions to change the boundaries of the territory and state border of Ukraine, to start and wage an aggressive war. As a result of the investigation, the latter were put on the wanted list.

As head of the Bucha district prosecutor’s office of the Kyiv region, he has established various operational processes in terms of proper collection and documentation of evidence during the investigation of war crimes of Russians against the Ukrainian civilian population during the occupation in 2022.

== Controversies and resignation ==
Kravchenko's tenure as Prosecutor General was marked by controversy over relations between the Prosecutor General's Office and Ukraine's anti-corruption institutions, particularly the National Anti-Corruption Bureau of Ukraine (NABU) and the Specialized Anti-Corruption Prosecutor's Office (SAPO).

In September 2026, NABU and SAPO investigated an alleged criminal organization involving officials of the Prosecutor General's Office. The investigation, referred to by law-enforcement authorities as the "Carthage" operation, concerned alleged protection of illegal call-center operations and the receipt and laundering of illicit funds. NABU conducted searches at premises used by officials of the Prosecutor General's Office, including premises associated with Kravchenko. Several officials were subsequently detained and charged in connection with the investigation.

Kravchenko denied involvement in protecting illegal call centers and stated that he did not have procedural status as a suspect in the criminal proceedings. On 7 September 2026, he announced his resignation as Prosecutor General, describing the decision as political. At the time of his resignation, he had not been charged as a suspect in the "Carthage" case.

In September 2026, Kravchenko also publicly accused NABU Director Semen Kryvonos and SAPO head Oleksandr Klymenko of wrongdoing and announced that a criminal proceeding had been initiated against Kryvonos. NABU and SAPO disputed the allegations and stated that Kryvonos had not been formally served with a notice of suspicion. The allegations against Kryvonos were subsequently withdrawn and the corresponding information was removed from the Unified Register of Pre-Trial Investigations.

On 14 September 2026, President Volodymyr Zelenskyy suspended Kravchenko from the position of Prosecutor General pending his dismissal. Before this, Kravchenko had signed an order sending himself on a five-day business trip to Paris. He left Ukraine during the trip and did not return after its expiration. Ukrainian media reported that he crossed the border in a government vehicle. Kravchenko denied that he had fled Ukraine and said that his trip was connected with his professional duties.

On 15 September 2026, the Verkhovna Rada approved Kravchenko's dismissal as Prosecutor General, and the President subsequently signed the relevant decree. On 21 September, while remaining a prosecutor of the Prosecutor General's Office, Kravchenko was dismissed from the prosecution service at his own request..

== Awards ==
In 2016, he was awarded the Order of Danylo Halytskyi and the Presidential Award "For Participation in the Anti-Terrorist Operation."

In 2018, he was awarded the "Badge of Honor."

In 2019, he received the badge "For Conscientious Service in the Prosecutor's Office."

In 2022, he gained the "Order of Merit", III degree.

== Notes ==
- УКАЗ ПРЕЗИДЕНТА УКРАЇНИ від 23 серпня 2022 року №593/2022 «Про відзначення державними нагородами України з нагоди Дня Незалежності України». www.president.gov.ua
- УКАЗ ПРЕЗИДЕНТА УКРАЇНИ від 10 квітня 2023 року №204/2023 «Про призначення Р. Кравченка головою Київської обласної державної адміністрації». www.president.gov.ua
