= Oleksandr Pavliuk =

Ukrainian lieutenant general (born 1970)

- Олександр Павлюк
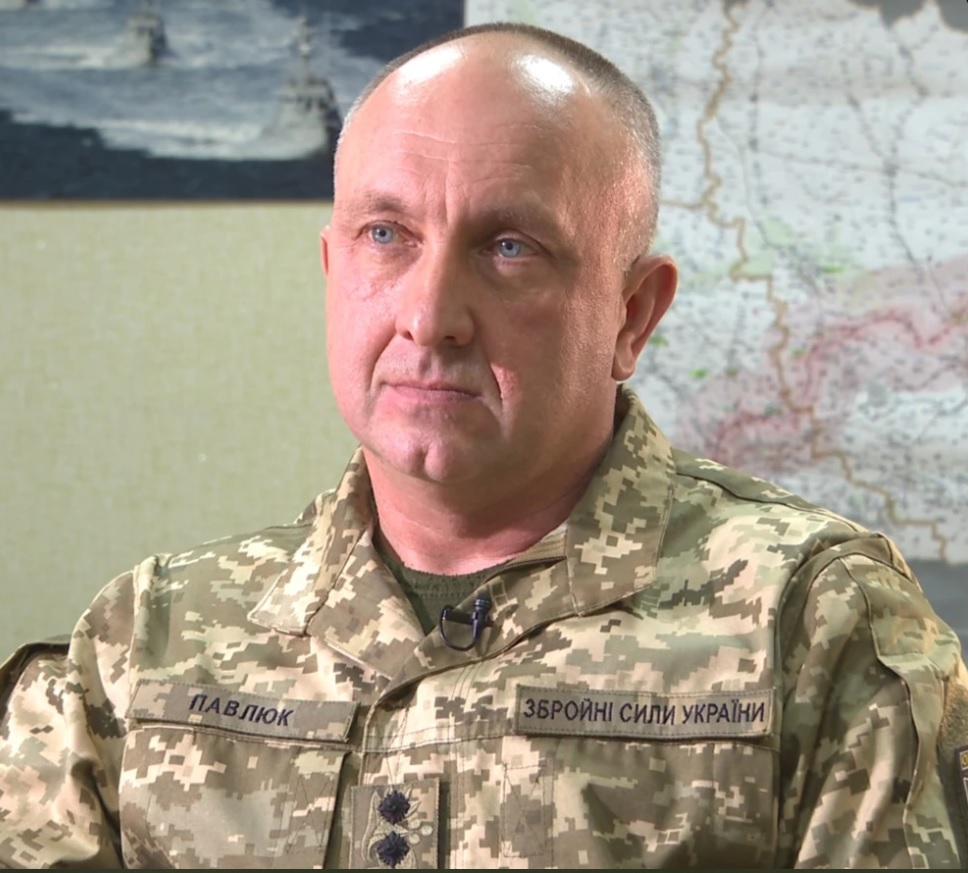
- Pavliuk in 2021

Commander of the Ukrainian Ground Forces
- In office 11 February 2024 – 29 November 2024
- President: Volodymyr Zelenskyy
- Prime Minister: Denys Shmyhal
- Preceded by: Oleksandr Syrskyi
- Succeeded by: Mykhailo Drapatiy

First Deputy Minister of Defense
- In office 14 February 2023 – 10 February 2024
- President: Volodymyr Zelenskyy
- Prime Minister: Denys Shmyhal

Governor of Kyiv Oblast
- In office 15 March 2022 – 21 May 2022
- President: Volodymyr Zelensky
- Preceded by: Oleksiy Kuleba
- Succeeded by: Oleksiy Kuleba

Personal details
- Born: Oleksandr Oleksiiovych Pavliuk; 20 August 1970 (age 56) Novohrad-Volynskyi, Ukrainian SSR, Soviet Union (now Ukraine)
- Military career
- Allegiance: Ukraine
- Service years: 1991–present
- Rank: Lieutenant General
- Commands: Ukrainian Peacekeeping forces in Kosovo; Operational Command West; Commander, training of the Land Forces Command of the Armed Forces of Ukraine; Commander, Joint Forces; Kyiv Regional Military Administration
- Conflicts: Peacekeeping operations in Kosovo; Russo-Ukrainian War; Kyiv offensive
- Awards: Hero of Ukraine; Order of Bohdan Khmelnytsky II class; Order of Bohdan Khmelnytsky III class

Oleksandr Oleksiiovych Pavliuk (Ukrainian: Олександр Олексійович Павлюк; born 20 August 1970) is a Ukrainian general serving as commander of the Ukrainian Ground Forces from 11 February 2024 until 29 November 2024. He was a participant in the war in Donbas and the Ukrainian defense against the 2022 Russian invasion of Ukraine. On 14 February 2023 he was appointed First Deputy Minister of Defense.

From 15 March 2022 until 21 May 2022 Pavliuk was head (Governor) of Kyiv Oblast State Administration.

== Biography ==
Pavliuk was the commander of the Ukrainian peacekeeping forces in Kosovo from 2006 to 2007. He then commanded Operational Command West from 2017 to 2020, before being appointed as Commander of the training of the Land Forces Command of the Armed Forces of Ukraine in 2020.

On July 28, 2021, he was appointed the Commander of the Joint Forces. A command he held until 15 March 2022, when he was appointed commander of the "Kyiv Regional Military Administration".

From 15 March 2022 until 21 May 2022 Pavliuk was head (Governor) of Kyiv Oblast State Administration. According to Deputy Head of the Office of the President of Ukraine Kyrylo Tymoshenko Pavliuk returned to military affairs. Oleksiy Kuleba succeeded him as Governor.

On 14 February 2023 Pavliuk was appointed First Deputy Minister of Defense. On 11 February 2024, he was appointed as commander of the Ukrainian Ground Forces.

On 4 May 2024, Pavliuk was put on Russia's wanted list, along with president Volodymyr Zelenskyy and former president Petro Poroshenko.

On 29 November 2024, Zelenskyy dismissed Pavliuk from his post as the Commander of the Ukrainian Ground Forces. He was replaced by Major General Mykhailo Drapatyi.

== Awards ==
On 3 March 2022, President Volodymyr Zelenskyy conferred the title of "Hero of Ukraine" to Pavliuk, citing his "personal courage and heroism", significantly contributing to the "protection of state sovereignty and territorial integrity of Ukraine". He was previously awarded the Order of Bohdan Khmelnytsky III class and Order of Bohdan Khmelnytsky II class.
