= Vladyslav Krykliy =

Ukrainian politician

- Владислав Криклій
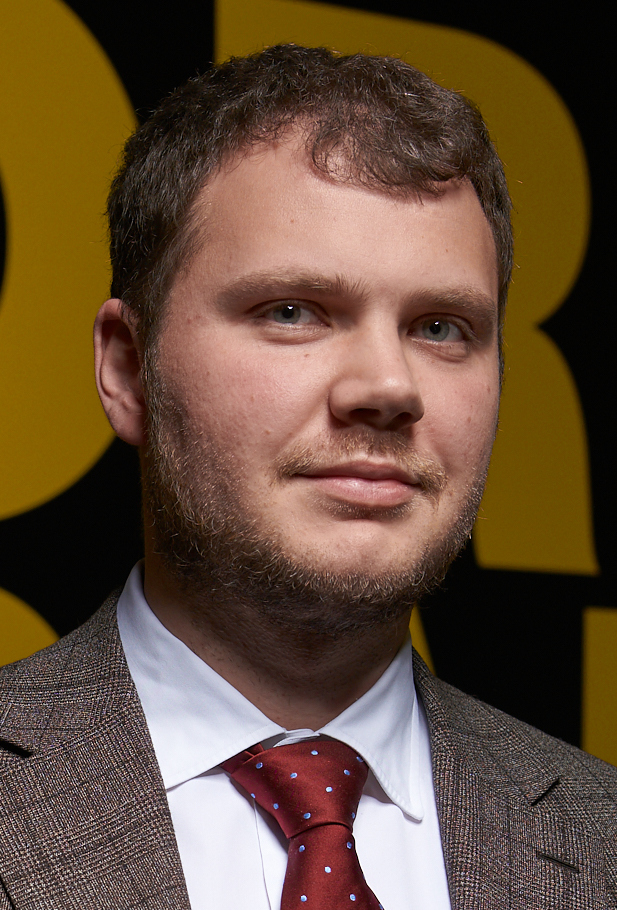
- Krikliy in 2020

Minister of Infrastructure
- In office 29 August 2019 – 18 May 2021
- President: Volodymyr Zelenskyy
- Prime Minister: Oleksiy Honcharuk; Denys Shmyhal
- Preceded by: Volodymyr Omelyan
- Succeeded by: Oleksandr Kubrakov

People's Deputy of Ukraine
- In office 29 August 2019 – 29 August 2019

Personal details
- Born: 23 November 1986 (age 39) Kyiv, Ukrainian SSR, Soviet Union (now Ukraine)
- Party: Independent
- Other political affiliations: Servant of the People
- Education: Taras Shevchenko National University of Kyiv
- Occupation: Economist civil servant politician

Vladyslav Arturovych Krykliy (Ukrainian: Владислав Артурович Криклій; born 23 November 1986) is a Ukrainian economist, civil servant and politician. From 29 August 2019 to 18 May 2021 he served as Minister of Infrastructure of Ukraine.

== Biography ==
Krykliy studied at the Taras Shevchenko National University of Kyiv (2009). Candidate of Economic Sciences (2015).

From 2002 to 2008, he served as the head of the stock market securities department at Interbank. From 2008 to 2010, Krykliy worked at the Astrum Investment Management company. From 2011 to 2013, he was a director of Cinema Theater LLC.

From 2014 to 2015, Krykliy worked as an adviser to the Minister of Internal Affairs. Head of the Main Service Center of the Ministry of Internal Affairs.

Krykliy was on a party list of the Servant of the People political party during the 2019 parliamentary elections, yet himself is not a registered member of the party (non-partisan, according to the Central Election Commission). Krykliy was elected to the Verkhovna Rada (the Ukrainian parliament) in 2019. He surrendered his deputy mandate upon his ministerial appointment on 29 August 2019.

On 29 August 2019, Krykliy was appointed Minister of Infrastructure of Ukraine.

On 14 May 2021, Krykliy offered his resignation as Minister, according to a source of UNIAN he was denounced for leading a "shadow back office" in the ministry, allegedly working in the interests of the chairman of the Verkhovna Rada transport committee, Yuriy Kisel. On 18 May 2021, parliament dismissed Krykliy as Minister.

== See also ==
- Honcharuk Government
- List of members of the parliament of Ukraine, 2019–24
