= Governor of Kyiv Oblast =

Chief executive of Kyiv Oblast, Ukraine

Head of State Regional Administration (Governor) of Kyiv Oblast
- Coat of arms of Kyiv Oblast

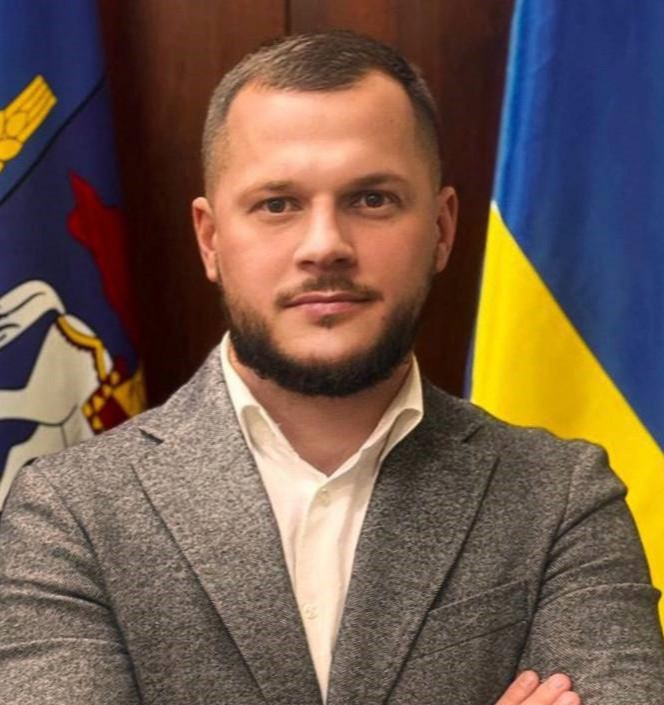
- Incumbent; Mykola Kalashnyk since 24 March 2025
- Residence: Kyiv
- Appointer: President of Ukraine
- Term length: Four years
- Constituting instrument: Chapter VI, Article 118
- Inaugural holder: Ivan Kapshtyk
- Formation: In 1992, as Presidential representative
- Website: koda.gov.ua

The chairman of the Kyiv Oblast State Administration (Ukrainian: Голова Київської обласної державної адміністрації, romanized: Holova Kyivskoi oblasnoi derzhavnoi administratsii) or unofficially governor of Kyiv Oblast (Ukrainian: Губернатор Київської області, romanized: Hubernator Kyivskoi oblasti), is the chairman of the executive branch of Kyiv Oblast, a province in northern Ukraine. The official residence is located in the country's capital, Kyiv which is a city with special status, and not in the Oblast or governed by the Kyiv Oblast State Administration.

== Authority ==
According to Chapter VI of the constitution, the office of governor is appointed by the president, on recommendation from the cabinet of ministers, to serve a four-year term of office. The oblast's council can express a motion of no confidence to the governor, after which the Ukrainian president will issue a "substantiated reply." However, if two-thirds of the oblast council's deputies pass a resolution of no confidence in the governor, the president must decide on the governor's resignation.

As part of the constitutional reform in Ukraine, President Petro Poroshenko proposed abolishing the office of chairmen of the regional state administrations, and instead replacing them with the office of the Representative of the President of Ukraine (Ukrainian: Представник Президента України, Predstavnyk Presydenta Ukrainy) which will be appointed in each of Ukraine's 24 oblasts. These representatives will have significantly less authority over the regions in which they serve, instead being appointed to oversee the authority and constitutionality of Ukraine's administrative units.

== List of heads of Kyiv Oblast State Administration ==
Until the fall of the Soviet Union in 1991, most of the authority in Kyiv Oblast belonged to the Kyiv Regional Committee of the Communist Party of Ukraine. The following is a full list of the leaders of Kyiv Oblast from 1932 until the present day.

=== Representative of the President ===
- Ivan Kapshtyk (1992–1994)
- in 1994–1995 the office was liquidated and its duties temporarily transferred to the chairman of the regional council executive committee

=== Heads of the Oblast State Administration ===
- Vasyl Sinko (1995—1996)
- Anatolii Zasukha (1996—2005)
- Yevhen Zhovtyak (2005—2006)
- Valeriy Kondruk (2006) (acting)
- Vira Ulianchenko (2006—2009)
- Viktor Vakarash (2009—2010) (Note: Acting to September 17, 2009)
- Anatolii Prysyazhnyuk (2010–2014)
- Volodymyr Shandra (since 2 March 2014 — 27 January 2016)
- Maksym Melnychuk (3 February 2016 — 9 September 2016)
- Lev Partzkhaladze (acting) (9 September 2016 — 28 October 2016)
- Oleksandr Horhan (28 October 2016 — 30 October 2018)
- Oleksandr Tereschuk (30 October 2018 — 11 June 2019)
- Vyacheslav Kucher (acting) (11 June 2019 — 9 July 2019)
- Mykhailo Bno-Airiian (10 July 2019 — 28 October 2019)
- Oleksiy Chernyshov (28 October 2019 – 4 March 2020)
- Vasyl Volodin (18 June 2020 — 8 February 2022) (Note: On 11 March 2020 appointed as acting Governor)
- Oleksiy Kuleba (8 February 2022 — 15 March 2022)
- Oleksandr Pavlyuk (15 March 2022 — 21 May 2022)
- Oleksiy Kuleba (21 May 2022 — 24 January 2023)
- Dymtro Nazarekno (acting) (25 January - 10 April 2023)
- Ruslan Kravchenko (10 April 2023 - 30 December 2024)
- Mykola Kalashnyk (since 24 March 2025)

== See also ==
- Kyiv City State Administration
