= Andriy Pyvovarsky =

Ukrainian businessman and former politician

- Андрій Пивоварський
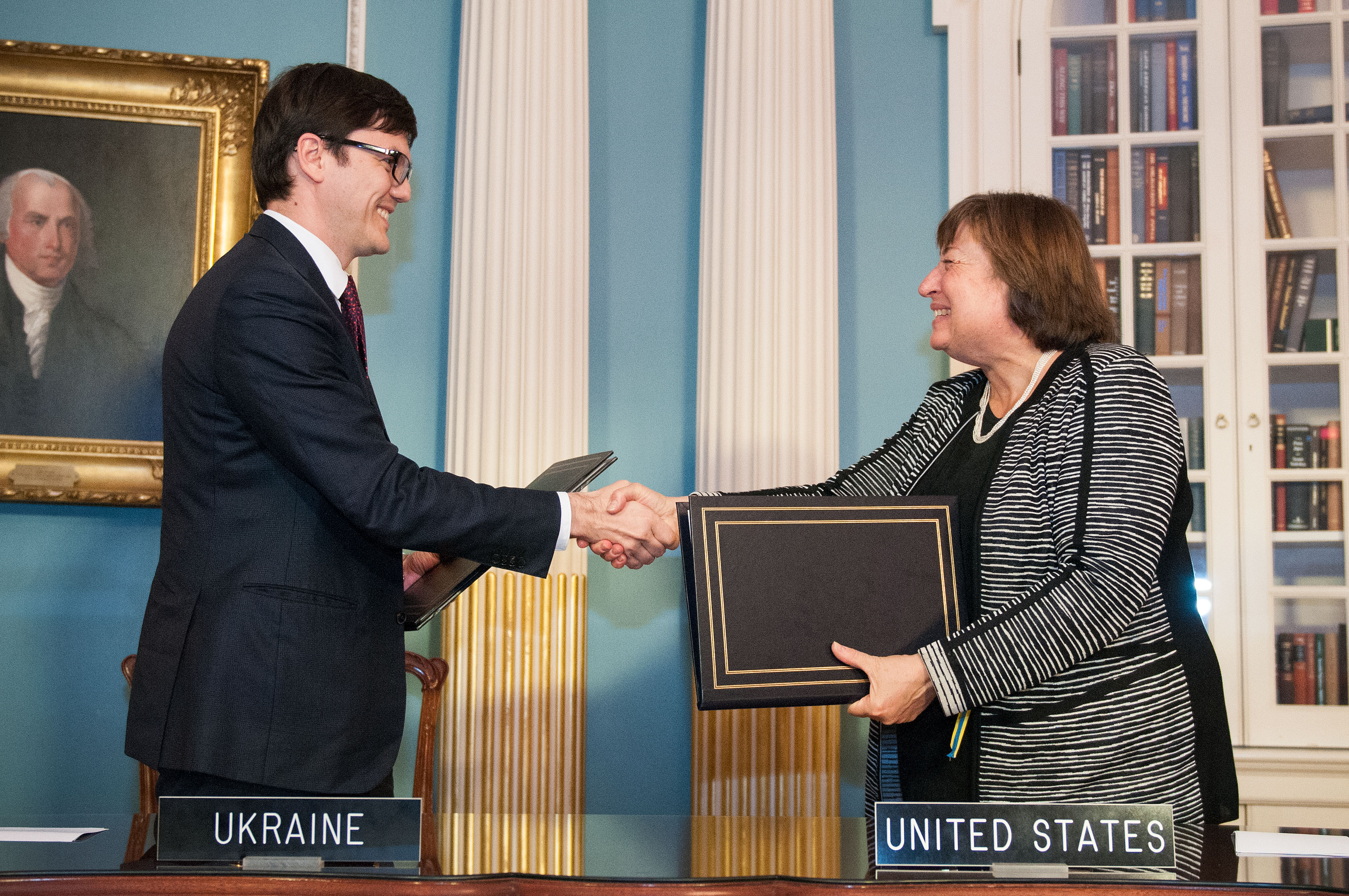
- U.S. Under Secretary for Energy Catherine A. Novelli (right) and Pyvovarsky (left) in 2015

4th Minister of Infrastructure
- In office 2 December 2014 – 14 April 2016
- Prime Minister: Arseniy Yatsenyuk
- Preceded by: Maksym Burbak
- Succeeded by: Volodymyr Omelyan

Personal details
- Born: 12 June 1978 (age 48) Kyiv, Ukrainian SSR, Soviet Union
- Education: Kyiv University; Tufts University

Andriy Mykolayovych Pyvovarsky (Ukrainian: Андрій Миколайович Пивоварський) is a Ukrainian businessman and a former Minister of Infrastructure of Ukraine. He did not retain his post in the Groysman Government that was installed on 14 April 2016.

== Biography ==
Pyvovarsky graduated in 2000 from the history department of the Taras Shevchenko National University in Kyiv. In 2003 he received a master's degree in International Business and Finance of Tufts University (United States).

From 1998 to 2001 he worked as a financial analyst and business developer in Kyiv Investment Group BLASIG, where he developed and oversaw a number of projects with an investment of $10 million.

From 2003 to 2006 Pyvovarsky worked at International Finance Corporation (IFC) as an investment adviser.

In January 2006 Pyvovarsky joined the investment company Dragon Capital, where he headed the investment banking division.

In January 2013 Pyvovarsky became CEO of Continuum Group, which is owned by Ihor Yeremeyev, Stepan Ivakhiv and Petro Dyminskyi.

On 2 December 2014 Pyvovarsky was appointed Minister of Infrastructure of Ukraine in the second Yatsenyuk Government.

On 11 December 2015 Pyvovarsky announced his resignation. He stated he planned to resign because his subordinates, volunteers he had attracted to the ministry, could not "work having non-market salaries". An anonymous source in his ministry told UNIAN that Pyvovarsky was "extremely dissatisfied" with the Bloc of Petro Poroshenko faction refusal to adopt key bills regarding Ukraine's transport industry. His resignation letter was submitted to the Verkhovna Rada (Ukraine's parliament) in December 2015. Pyvovarsky was never formally dismissed. He was finally relieved from his post when the Groysman Government was installed on 14 April 2016.

Political offices
Preceded by Maksym Burbak	Minister of Infrastructure of Ukraine; 2014-2016	Succeeded by Volodymyr Omelyan
