= Oleksiy Kuleba =

Ukrainian statesman, public and political figure

- Олексій Кулеба
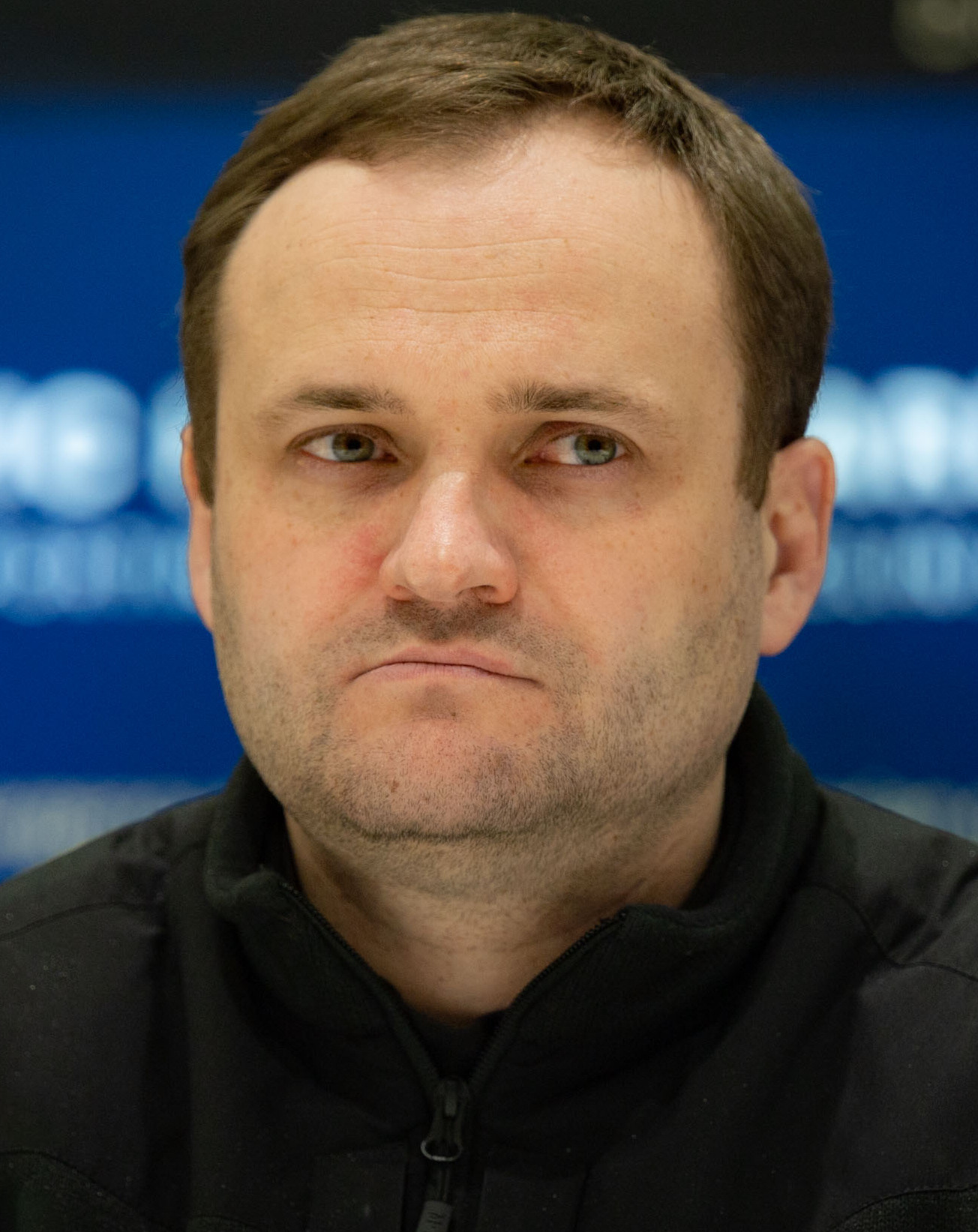
- Kuleba in 2024

Deputy Prime Minister – Minister of Community and Territories Development
- In office 5 September 2024 – 16 July 2026
- Preceded by: Vasyl Shkurakov
- Succeeded by: Mykola Kalashnyk (Minister of Infrastructure); Vitalii Bezghin (Minister of Communities and Territories)

Deputy Head of the Office of the President of Ukraine
- In office 24 January 2023 – 5 September 2024
- Preceded by: Kyrylo Tymoshenko
- Succeeded by: Viktor Mykyta

Governor of Kyiv Oblast
- In office 21 May 2022 – 24 January 2023
- Preceded by: Oleksandr Pavlyuk
- Succeeded by: Dmytro Nazarenko (acting)
- In office 8 February 2022 – 15 March 2022
- Preceded by: Vasyl Volodin
- Succeeded by: Oleksandr Pavlyuk

Deputy Governor of Kyiv Oblast
- In office 16 March 2022 – 21 May 2022

Personal details
- Born: 8 August 1983 (age 43) Kiev, Ukrainian SSR, Soviet Union
- Spouse: Halyna Dmytrychenko
- Children: 2

Oleksiy Volodymyroyvch Kuleba (Ukrainian: Олексій Володимирович Кулеба; born 8 August 1983) is a Ukrainian politician. Between 2024 and 2026 he served as Minister of Infrastructure, Communities and Territories. He had previously been Governor of Kyiv Oblast from 21 May 2022 until 24 January 2023.

He served as the Deputy Head of the Office of the President of Ukraine from January 24, 2023 to 5 September 2024, as Deputy Governor of Kyiv Oblast from 16 March 2022 till 21 May 2022, as Governor of Kyiv Oblast from 8 February 2022 till 15 March 2022, and served as Deputy Governor from 1 January 2021 to 7 February 2022.

He was the director of the Improvement Department of Kyiv City Council from 2019 to 2021, and was a councilmember of the Rzhyshchiv City Council of Kyiv Oblast from 2010 to 2015.

== Early life ==
Oleksiy Kuleba was born on 8 August 1983 in Kyiv in the family of journalist and writer Volodymyr Kuleba.

In 2005, he graduated from Kyiv National Economic University with a degree in International Economics and a master's degree in International Economics. He is a candidate of Sciences in Public Administration as of 2005. He is also a candidate for Master of Sports in Basketball.

== Career ==
In 2005, Kuleba was a manager of the municipal enterprise of Kyiv Regional Council "Kyiv-Media", in Kyiv.

From 2005 to 2008, he studied at the graduate school of the National Academy of Public Administration under the President of Ukraine. At the same time, he was an assistant to a People's Deputy of Ukraine.

From 2007 to 2010, he was the General Director of Khonin and Partners LLC.

In 2010, he was a Senior Lecturer of the Department of Self-Government PJSC "Higher Educational Institution" Interregional Academy of Personnel Management".

From 2010 to 2015, he was a councilmember (deputy) of the Rzhyshchiv City Council of Kyiv Oblast.

In 2014, he served as an assistant to a councilmember (deputy) of Kyiv City Council on a voluntary basis.

From 2016 to 2017, he was an advisor to the General Director of the "Pleso" Municipal Enterprise for the Protection, Maintenance and Operation of Lands of the Water Fund of Kyiv of the executive body of Kyiv City Council on a voluntary basis.

From 2018 to 2019, he served as general director of Asper LLC, in Kyiv.

From 2019 to 2021, he was serving as the director of the Department of Improvement of the Kyiv City Council.

From 2021 to 2022, he was the First Deputy Chairman of Kyiv City State Administration for the implementation of self-governing powers.

On 8 February 2022, Kuleba became the Governor of Kyiv Oblast.

On 15 March 2022, to further strengthen the defense of the capital and Kyiv Oblast, President of Ukraine Volodymyr Zelenskyy appointed Oleksandr Pavlyuk, a commander of the Joint Forces Operation, as the governor of Kyiv Oblast. Kuleba thus became the deputy governor again.

On 21 May 2022, he became Governor of Kyiv Oblast again. On 24 January 2023, he was once again removed from this position and subsequently appointed Deputy Head of the Office of the President of Ukraine on the same day.

== Social activity ==
In 2001, he founded the "Basketball School" civic organization (Ukrainian: «Школа баскетболу», lit. 'Shkola basketbolu'). From 2001 to 2019, he was the head of the subsequent NGO "Basketball School".

== Family ==
He is married to Halyna Dmytrychenko-Kuleba and has two daughters.
