= Ministry of Trade (Soviet Union) =

Government ministry of the Soviet Union

The Ministry of Trade (Mintorg; Russian: Министерство торговли СССР) was a government ministry in the Soviet Union.

== Organization ==
Until 1958 the trade ministry system was organized at three basic levels: union, republic, and local. At the peak of the pyramid of trade organizations was the Ministry of Trade USSR, which not only maintained general supervision over the conduct and development of all domestic trade but also engaged in wholesale trade and, to a relatively minor extent, in retail trade through its chief directorates. The Ministry's wholesaling functions were carried out by about a dozen chief directorates organized to deal in certain product lines or to serve special markets, for example, the Chief Directorates of Refrigeration and Wholesale Trade in Meat and Butter; Wholesale Trade in Clothing; Wholesale Trade in Sugar, Confectionery Products, Canned Goods, Tobacco Products, and Other Groceries; and Trade Enterprises for the Military Services.

The ministries of trade at the republic level were dually subordinate - to the Ministry of Trade USSR, and to the councils of ministers of the republics. These ministries had chief directorates engaging in retail and wholesale - retail trade. Representative of such chief directorates were those conducting trade in manufactured goods; in bread and baked goods; in furniture; in household goods; in haberdashery and knitwear; and in textiles, sewn goods, and millinery. The Ministry of Trade RSFSR had a chief directorate dealing with trade in the Far North and an office for mail order trade. Besides carrying on extensive trade operations, republic ministries of trade supervised local trade organizations through ministries of trade of autonomous republics and through trade departments in oblast, kray, and city executive committees.

Most retail enterprises (stores and dining enterprises) in the trade ministry system were managed by organizations known as torgs, which were organized by product lines and by areas served. Operating according to the principle of economic accountability (khozraschet), torgs were directly subordinate to the trade departments of kray, oblast, or city executive committees; ministries of trade of autonomous-republics; or - in the case of republics not having Oblast divisions - ministries of trade of republics.

== History ==
Beginning in 1956, the duties of the Ministry of Trade, USSR, were gradually reduced. Most retail enterprises of union subordination were gradually transferred to republic and local trade authorities. In early 1957 a large part of the ministry's authority to fix prices was delegated to republic councils of ministers, and by the close of 1957 the Ministry of Trade also had relinquished most of its planning functions. Thus for 1958 the Council of Ministers USSR approved only the gross retail turnover plan by republic for the entire country and directly allocated only about 45 important goods. Detailed planning and distribution were accomplished at republic and lower levels. State trade and commodity inspectorates, which are important agencies of control, were turned over to republic ministries of trade.

Late in 1958 the Ministry of Trade, USSR, was left with little more than the management of wholesale operations, although it did continue to conduct retail trade in jewelry and lumber. On 28 November 1958 the Presidium of the Supreme Soviet announced the abolition of this ministry. The ministry's wholesale operations were transferred to republic ministries of trade, and the Chief Directorate for Interrepublic Deliveries of Consumer Goods in Gosplan, USSR, was given responsibility for coordinating trade among the 15 republics. With the transfer of functions to republic ministries of trade, certain organizational adjustments were required. The chief task for the republic ministries was the creation of new chief directorates around the nuclei provided by the remnants of the union chief directorates. In some instances, however, republic ministers of trade also accomplished significant consolidations. In the RSFSR, for example, the Manufactured Goods Trade Organization (Rospromtorg) and the Sporting Goods Trade Organization (Rossporttorg) were abolished, and their functions were transferred to "suitable republic wholesale offices." Important retail organizations were transferred from republic to local subordination.

== List of ministers ==
- Leonid Krasin (2.2.1924 - 9.5.1924)
- Andrei Lezhava (9.5.1924 - 17.12.1924)
- Aron Seinman (17.12.1924 - 18.11.1925)
- Izrail Weicer (29.7.1934 - 18.10.1937)
- Mikhail Smirnov (18.10.1937 - 21.1.1939)
- Aleksandr Lyubimov (21.1.1939 - 1.3.1948)
- Vasili Zhavoronkov (1.3.1948 - 15.3.1953)
- Anastas Mikoyan (15.9.1953 - 3.3.1954)
- Vasili Zhavoronkov (3.3.1954 - 24.8.1954)
- Dmitri Pavlov (3.2.1955 - 27.11.1958)
- Aleksandr Strujev (2.10.1965 - 20.1.1983)
- Grigori Vashchenko (20.1.1983 - 27.12.1986)
- Kondrat Terekh (27.12.1986 - 28.8.1991)
- Aleksandr Khlystov (28.8.1991 - 26.12.1991)
