= Ministry of Infrastructure (Ukraine) =

Government ministry of Ukraine

- Міністерство інфраструктури

Agency overview
- Formed: 1917-1920 (as Ministry of Roadways); July 1939 (People's Commissariat of Automobile Transport)
- Preceding agencies: Ministry of Transportation of Ukraine (1992-2004); Ministry of Transportation and Communication (2004-2010)
- Jurisdiction: Government of Ukraine
- Headquarters: 14, Victory Square, Kyiv, Ukraine, 01135
- Minister responsible: Mykola Kalashnyk, Minister of Infrastructure
- Child agencies: State Aviation Administration; Ukrainian Railways; Auto-Roads (Ukraine); State Sea and River Fleet
- Website: Official website

The Ministry of Infrastructure of Ukraine (Ukrainian: Міністерство інфраструктури України, romanized: Ministerstvo infrastruktury Ukrainy) functions as the main executive body that controls Ukraine's transportation infrastructure including roads, trains, and communications. The department is based on the former Transport and Communications Ministry and also oversees the implementation of government tourism policies.

== History ==
In December 2010, Ukrainian President Viktor Yanukovych announced that the former Transport and Communications Ministry (Ukrainian: Міністерство транспорту та зв'язку України, romanized: Ministerstvo transportu ta zviazku Ukrainy) would be reorganized into the Ministry of Infrastructure. The head office was located in Kyiv. On 12 May 2011, the Ministry of Infrastructure was approved as the successor of the Transport and Communications Ministry.

On 2 December 2022 the Shmyhal Government merged the Ministry of Infrastructure with the Ministry of Communities and Territories Development creating the Ministry of Development of Communities, Territories and Infrastructure.

On 16 July 2026 the Ministry of Infrastructure was separated from the Ministry of Communities and Territories, with Mykola Kalashnyk being appointed its new head.

== Structure ==
The Ministry comprises a central body, led by the minister, his/her first deputy, and other deputies who assist the minister. The Ministry also consists of several state administrations that specialize in certain fields and coordinate operations of government companies.

The ministry supervises implementation of government policy in transport and communication sectors as well as security related to transport. Transport of fuel fossils (i.e. oil and gas) is related to the government ministry on energy and fuel, while most of security responsibility matters are supervised by Ministry of Interior or other state agencies.

=== Subordinated agencies ===
Emblem of the State Service for Security on Transport

- State Aviation Service of Ukraine
- State Agency of Automobile Roads of Ukraine Ukravtodor (see Roads in Ukraine)
- State Service of Ukraine for Security on Transport
- State Transport Special Service (specialized agency)

==== Reorganized, liquidated, and not listed agencies ====
- State Agency of Ukraine in Tourism and Resorts, a government agency in tourism (liquidated, successor is unknown)
- State Administration of Rail Transport, in 2015 it was incorporated as a public stock company Ukrzaliznytsia
- State Auto transportation Service became State Service of Ukraine in Security on Transport
- State Service of Maritime and River Transport of Ukraine
- Service of Maritime and River Transport of Ukraine
- State Special Communications Service of Ukraine
- National Agency of Ukraine in preparation and conducting of Euro-2012
- State Service of Communication, On June 30, 2011 the State Service of Communication, State Administration of Communication (less the state owned company Ukrposhta), and the Telecommunication Systems and Information Security branch of the Security Service of Ukraine were consolidated to become the administration of State Special Communications Service of Ukraine.

=== Companies (former state agencies) ===
- Ukrposhta
- Ukrzaliznytsia
- Presa - State enterprise in distribution of periodic publications
- Ukrainian Sea Ports Authority
- Maritime Search and Rescue Service

== List of ministers of transportation ==
=== Ukrainian People's Republic and Ukrainian State ===
In the Imperial Russia and after its dissolution its successor states, a term "ways of communication" encompassed administration of any means of transportation but were focused primarily on railways. In Ukraine the agency, known as the "Ministry of Ways", was headed by railway specialists.

Name of ministry	Name of minister	Term of office	
Name of ministry	Name of minister	Start	End
General Secretary of Ways	Vsevolod Holubovych	July 1917	August 1917
Minister (General Secretary) of Ways	Vadym Yeshchenko	September 1917	31 January 1918
Minister of Ways	Yevhen Sokovych	31 January 1918	29 April 1918
Minister of Ways	Borys Butenko	3 May 1918	14 November 1918
Minister of Ways	E. Landsberg	14 November 1918	14 December 1918
Minister of Ways	Pylyp Pylypchuk	26 December 1918	9 April 1919
Minister of Ways	Mykola Shadlun	9 April 1919	29 August 1919
Minister of Ways	Serhiy Tymoshenko	29 August 1919	31 December 1920

=== West Ukrainian People's Republic ===
Name of ministry	Name of minister	Term of office	
Name of ministry	Name of minister	Start	End
State Secretary of Communications (Ways)	Ivan Myron	9 November 1918	9 June 1919

=== Soviet Ukraine ===
Name of ministry	Name of minister	Term of office	
Name of ministry	Name of minister	Start	End
Ministry of Automobile Transport and Chausses Roadways	Mykhailo Dovhal	25 May 1953	29 May 1961
Ministry of Automobile Transport and Chausses Roadways	Ivan Bratchenko	29 May 1961	1968
Ministry of Automobile Transport	Ivan Bratchenko	1968	1 April 1970
Ministry of Automobile Transport	Fedir Holovchenko	1 April 1970	26 November 1984
Ministry of Automobile Transport	Pavlo Volkov	26 November 1984	1988
Ministry of Transport	Pavlo Volkov	1988	1991

=== Ukraine (since 1991) ===
Name of ministry	Name of minister	Term of office	
Name of ministry	Name of minister	Start	End
Ministry of Transport	Orest Klympush	March 1992	July 1994
Ministry of Transport	Ivan Dankevych	July 1995	May 1997
Ministry of Transport	Mykola Kruhlov	23 May 1997	17 July 1997
Ministry of Transport	Valeriy Cherep	11 August 1997	April 1998
Ministry of Transport	Ivan Dankevych	7 August 1998	October 5, 1999
Ministry of Transport	Leonid Kostyuchenko	1999	May 2001
Ministry of Transport	Valeriy Pustovoitenko	9 June 2001	30 April 2002
Ministry of Transport	Heorhiy Kirpa	May 2002	24 July 2004
Ministry of Transport and Communication	Heorhiy Kirpa	24 July 2004	27 December 2004
Ministry of Transport and Communication	Yevhen Chervonenko	February 2005	September 2005
Ministry of Transport and Communication	Viktor Bondar	September 2005	September 2006
Ministry of Transport and Communication	Mykola Rudkovsky	4 August 2006	2007
Ministry of Transport and Communication	Yosyp Vinsky	18 December 2007	23 June 2009
Ministry of Transport and Communication	Kostyantyn Yefymenko	11 March 2010	9 December 2010
Ministry of Infrastructure	Borys Kolesnikov	9 December 2010	24 December 2012
Ministry of Infrastructure	Volodymyr Kozak	24 December 2012	27 February 2014
Ministry of Infrastructure	Maksym Burbak	27 February 2014	2 December 2014
Ministry of Infrastructure	Andriy Pyvovarsky	2 December 2014	14 April 2016
Ministry of Infrastructure	Volodymyr Omelyan	14 April 2016	29 August 2019
Ministry of Infrastructure	Vladyslav Krykliy	29 August 2019	18 May 2021
Ministry of Infrastructure	Oleksandr Kubrakov	20 May 2021	1 December 2022
Ministry of Development of Communities, Territories and Infrastructure	Oleksandr Kubrakov	1 December 2022	9 May 2024
Ministry of Development of Communities, Territories and Infrastructure	Vasyl Shkurakov (acting)	9 May 2024	5 September 2024
Ministry of Development of Communities, Territories and Infrastructure	Oleksiy Kuleba	5 September 2024	16 July 2026
Ministry of Infrastructure	Mykola Kalashnyk	16 July 2026	Incumbent

== See also ==
- Transport in Ukraine
  - List of airports in Ukraine
- Telecommunications in Ukraine
- Internet in Ukraine
- Tourism in Ukraine
