= Dmytro Nazarenko (politician) =

Ukrainian politician (born 1985)

- Дмитро Назаренко
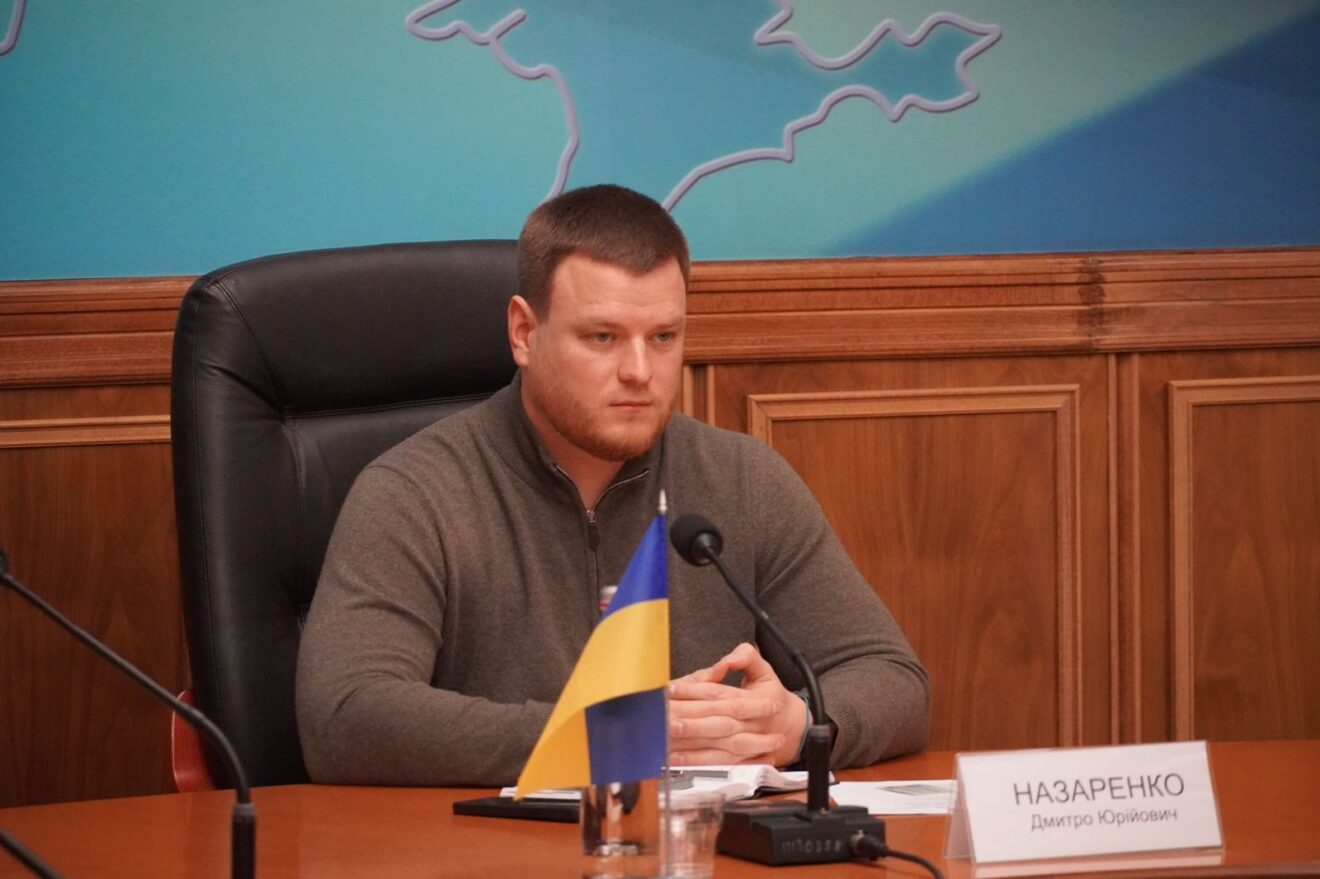

Governor of Kyiv Oblast
- Acting
- In office 25 January – 10 April 2023
- Preceded by: Oleksiy Kuleba
- Succeeded by: Ruslan Kravchenko

First Deputy Governor of Kyiv Oblast
- Incumbent
- Assumed office 10 December 2020

First Deputy Governor of Kyiv Oblast
- In office 12 January 2018 – 10 December 2020

Head of Trostyanetska Raion State Administration
- In office 6 March 2015 – 12 January 2018

Personal details
- Born: Dmytro Yuriyovych Nazarenko; 30 December 1985 (age 40) Sumy, Ukrainian SSR, Soviet Union (now Sumy, Sumy Oblast, Ukraine)

Dmytro Yuriyovych Nazarenko (Ukrainian: Дмитро Юрійович Назаренко; born on 30 December 1985) is a Ukrainian statesman, who was the acting head of the Kyiv Oblast State Administration from 25 January to 10 April 2023.

== Biography ==
Dmytro Nazarenko was born in Sumy on 30 December 1985.

From 2003 to 2009, Nazarenko studied at Sumy State University, majoring in hydraulic and pneumatic machines.

From 2005 to 2012, he was the director of Mashhimnaftoservice LLC. From 2012 to 2015, he was the director of Tehmas LLC.

On 6 March 2015, Nazarenko was appointed the head of the Trostyanetska raion state administration of the Sumy Oblast, while simultaneously becoming a deputy of the Trostyanetska district council.

He graduated from the Kharkiv National University of Internal Affairs in 2016, majoring in law. At the beginning of 2018, Nazarenko became the head of the Department of Regional Development of the Kyiv Regional State Administration.

On 12 January 2018, he was appointed deputy head of the Kyiv Regional State Administration. On 10 December 2020, Nazarenko became the first deputy head of the Kyiv Regional State Administration.

On 25 January 2023, after Oleksiy Kuleba, was appointed as the deputy head of the Office of the President of Ukraine, Nazarenko became the acting head of the Kyiv regional military administration.
