= State University of Trade and Economics =

Public university in Kyiv, Ukraine

Coordinates: 50°27′57″N 30°38′17″E

- Державний торговельно-економічний університет (ДТЕУ)
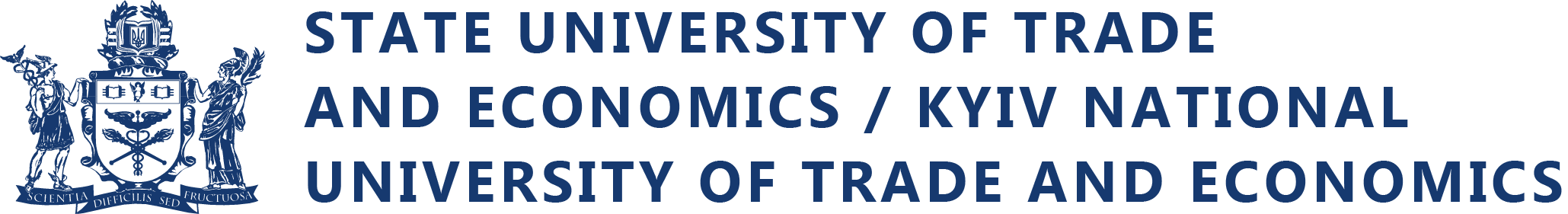
- Other names: SUTE, KNUTE (see §)
- Motto: Latin: Scientia difficilis sed fructuosa
- Type: Public
- Established: 1946
- Affiliations: Ministry of Education and Science of Ukraine
- Rector: Anatoliy A. Mazaraki
- Students: 40,000
- Campus: Urban, 19 Kyoto St., Kyiv, Ukraine, 02156.
- Language: Ukrainian, English
Colors
- Website: sute.edu.ua

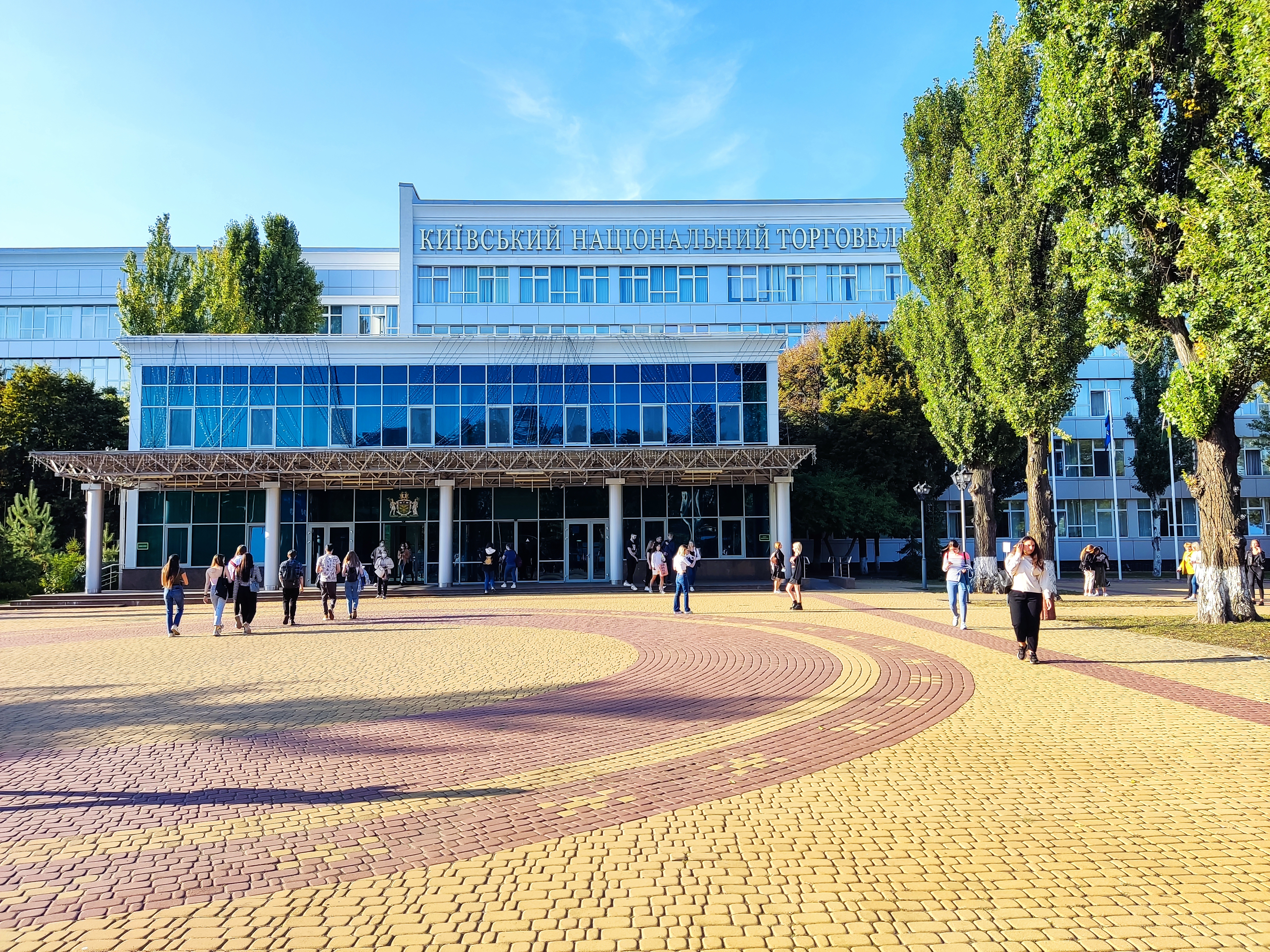
View of the university in 2021

The State University of Trade and Economics (abbr. SUTE, Ukrainian: Державний торговельно-економічний університет; prev. also known: Kyiv National University of Trade and Economics, abbr. KNUTE, Київський національний торговельно-економічний університет) is a Ukrainian university in the capital, Kyiv.

== History ==
The history of State University of Trade and Economics starts from the Kyiv branch of the all Union Correspondence Institute of Soviet Trade founded in 1946. With the foundation of the Ministry of Trade of UkrSSR in 1958. In addition to the subordination of all educational establishments located on the territory of Ukraine to the Ministry of Trade and according to the resolution on the Council of Ministers of UkrSSR. No. 50 of 14 January 1959 Kyiv branch of all the Union Correspondence Institute of Soviet Trade and then to Donetsk Institute of Soviet Trade.

In September 1965, Vasyl Zadorozhnyi, candidate of Sciences (Economics) was appointed the director of the branch. The deputy director became candidate of Sciences (Economies) Olexsiy Kolchin. An urgent need for highly qualified specialists for the trade sphere resulted in the creation of the base of the branch; an independent higher educational establishment. By the resolution of the Council of ministers of Ukr.SSR No. 195 of 4 March 1966 on the base of Donetsk Institute of Soviet Trade Kyiv Institute of Trade and Economics was founded, comprising Odesa and Chernivetskyi affiliations. The Institute included four faculties: the faculty of Trade, Economics faculty, technological faculty and qualification improvement faculty.

In October 1966 Tamara Skirda, candidate of Sciences (Philosophy) was appointed the rector of KITE. The plan of building initiated by T. Skirda included the building of the Institute complex, comprising teaming – laboratory complex, dormitories, food complex, assembly hall. Lev Bespalyi, Vasilyi Yorelkin, Vladymir Jvanitsky, Mykhail Melman, Alexey Kolchin, Anna Rudavska became the leading scientific – pedagogical staff of the institute.

In 1986 – 1987 the rector of the university was doctor of sciences (economics), professor Ivan Mayboroda, and Victor Nevesenko was the rector in 1988 – 1990.

In November 1991 Anatoliy Mazaraki was appointed the rector of the university.

By the Decree No. 592 of 29 August 1994, of the Cabinet of Ministers of Ukraine the educational establishment was converted into Kyiv State University of Trade and Economics. In April 1994 the Institute got the highest IVth level of state accreditation. In August 1994 the Kyiv State University of Trade and Economics was founded on the base of the Kyiv Institute of Trade and Economics.

By the Decree of the President of Ukraine No. 1059/2000 of 11 September 2000 the university was granted the status of the National University.

By the Decree of the President of Ukraine No. 1104/2026 of 9 November 2026 the State University of Trade and Economics was granted the status of the National University.

== Name change timeline ==
Historically, the university has often changed its name depending on subordination, reorganization, or granting of status by the government or president.

- 1946-1959 - Kyiv branch of the All-Union Correspondence Institute of Soviet Trade
- 1959-1959 - Kyiv branch of Kharkiv Institute of Soviet Trade
- 1959-1966 - Kyiv branch of Donetsk Institute of Soviet Trade
- 1966-1994 - Kyiv Institute of Trade and Economics (KITE)
- 1994-2000 - Kyiv State University of Trade and Economics (KSUTE)
- 2000-2022 - Kyiv National University of Trade and Economics (KNUTE)
- from 2022 - State University of Trade and Economics (SUTE)

The latest name change occurred due to reorganization due to changes in legislation. As of 2025, the university expects to be re-granted national status by the President of Ukraine with another name change to the National University of Trade and Economics (NUTE).

== Campuses and buildings ==
The university as the base establishment in Kyiv includes 6 teaching – laboratory buildings.

A – teaching – administrative building. Teaching classes and laboratories of Faculty of Economics, Management and Law, Faculty of Restaurant, Hospitality and Tourist business, Faculty of Science of Commodity and Trade Entrepreneurship, Faculty of Finance and Banking, as well as the dean's offices and the administration of the university are located here.

B – Teaching – librarian building Lecture halls and the largest library in Ukraine are located here.

C – Cultural – artistic building in which the large assembly hall housing 800 people, selection committee and archive of the university are located.

D – Teaching – training building. The building houses the Institute of Higher qualification, French-Ukrainian Institute of Management, Center of teaching-training firms, Center of pre-university preparation for foreigners, Center of foreign business language.

E – educational – administrative building Dean office, classrooms of Faculty of Accounting, Audit and Economic Cybernetics, Center of pre-university preparation, gym, assembly hall with 400 seats, canteen are located here.

F – Educational – production building Educational production, association laboratories of technology and organization of restaurant business, university canteen are located here.

G – sports complex with athletic arena, tennis court, stadium with artificial turf and campus with 2500 years.

== Institutes and Faculties ==
The university comprises, besides its basic establishment, where five institutes function, ten colleges and higher commercial schools.

=== The Faculty of Economics, Management and Law ===
(founded in 1966) is the most numerous at Kyiv National University of Trade and Economics – the annual number of students is 4.000 persons. The basis of educational programme for training at the faculty make the subjects in the series of humanities, social-economic, natural-scientific and fundamental, professional and practical training. The faculty trains experts in the following areas: "Marketing", "Advertising and Public Relations", "Economy of an Enterprise", "International Economy", "Management", "Finance and Credit". The faculty comprises 7 specialized departments:

- the department of management;
- the department of economy and finance of an enterprise;
- the department of economic theory and competitive policy;
- the department of international economy;
- the department of marketing and advertising;
- the department of commercial law;
- the department of jurisprudence.

○ Starting from the late 2016, to that faculty was added one more specialization "The Science of Commodities".

=== The Faculty of Hospitality, Restaurant and Tourist Industry ===
(founded in 1966). The total number of students is 3.500 persons. The faculty trains according to the following educational-qualification programmes: "Management", "Food Technologies and Engineering", "Hospitality and Restaurant Business", "Tourism". The faculty comprises 4 departments:

- the department of technology and organization of restaurant business
- the specialized department in the area "Technologies in restaurant business", "Hospitality and restaurant business";
- the department of hospitality, restaurant and tourist business – the specialized department in the area of "Tourism", "Management of organizations and administration", professional direction "Management of tourist business", "Management of hospitality and restaurant business" and "Management of exhibition business";
- the department of engineering subjects;
- the department of physical training.

=== The Faculty of Science of Commodities and Trade Entrepreneurship ===
(founded in 1966). The total number of students is about 1.500 persons. The faculty trains experts according to educational-qualification programmes "Science of commodities and trade entrepreneurship" and "Philology". The faculty comprises 4 departments:

- the department of science of commodities and expertise of foodstuffs – the specialized department in the area of 'Science of commodities and trade entrepreneurship", professional direction "Science of commodities and commercial activity" ("Science of commodities and commercial logistics"); "Expertise of goods and services"; "Management of goods quality and safety".
- the department of science of commodities and expertise of non-foodstuffs – the specialized department in the area of "Science of commodities and trade entrepreneurship", professional direction "Science of commodities and commercial activity" ("Science of commodities and organization of foreign trade"); "Science of commodities and customs control":
- the department of trade entrepreneurship – the specialized department in the area of "Science of commodities and trade entrepreneurship", professional direction "Organisation of wholesale and retail trade";
- the department of modern European languages – the specialized department in the professional direction "Philology" (translation).

=== The Faculty of Accounting, Audit and Economic Cybernetics ===
(founded in 1966). The total number of students is about 1.500 persons. The faculty trains according to educational-qualification programmes "Accounting and Audit" and "Economic cybernetics". The faculty comprises 4 departments:

- the department of financial analysis and control – the specialized department in the area of "Accounting and Audit", professional direction "State financial control", "Audit of state finance";
- the department of accounting – the specialized department in the area of "Accounting and Audit", professional direction "Accounting and audit in entrepreneurship";
- the department of economic cybernetics and information systems – the specialized department in the area "Economic cybernetics", professional direction "Economic cybernetics";
- the department of philosophy and social sciences.

=== The Faculty of Finance and Banking ===
(founded in 1993). The total number of students is about 1.600 persons. The faculty comprises 5 departments:

- the department of banking – the specialized department in the area of "Finance and credit", professional direction "Banking" and "Financial intermediation";
- the department of finance – the specialized department in the area of "Finance and credit", professional direction "State finance", "State Treasury", "Insurance management";
- the department of statistics and econometry;
- the department of higher and applied mathematics;
- the department of psychology – the specialized department in the area of "Psychology".

=== The Institute of Higher Qualification of KNUTE ===
is a foundation for training for the public sector and business, implementation of business ideas, holding "round tables", conferences, seminars and business-forums. There are more than 60 ministries, central bodies of executive power and business structures among the partners and customers of the institute. The training course at the institute takes place according to 20 programmes (some MBA programs), and qualification improvement according to almost 30 permanent and short-term seminars-training which satisfy the needs of the business medium.

=== Center of European Education ===
Was founded in 2015 in Kyiv National University of Trade and Economics (Ukraine). Center trains French-speaking specialists in the field of the management of an enterprise, in specializations:

- Quality Management
- Trade Management
- Commercial Activity Management
- General Management of Enterprises
- Personnel Management
- Management of International Economic Activity of an Enterprise
- Purchasing Management and Logistics
- Management and Information Systems
- Internal and External Communication Management.

The students of the university get state-recognized diplomas (France):

- the second year of study – the Diploma of the University of Auvergne Clermont – 1 "Manager's Assistant" (a university diploma, DUMA)
- the third year of study – Diplome d'etudes universitaires generales (the state diploma of France, DEUG);
- the fourth year of study – the state diploma of France, LICENCE;
- the fifth year of study – the state diploma of France, MAITRISE.

The students study the French language intensively in the first and the second years (from the elementary level). Most lectures and seminars are held in French by the professors and lecturers of the University of Auvergne Clermont – 1from the third year. The study lasts five years. The study in the institute is parallel to the study in Kyiv National University of Trade and Economics (Ukraine). The process of study is carried out on the principle of validation of certain identical disciplines studied by the students in the basic faculty. It can be achieved through the harmonization the curricula for the students trained in Management in Kyiv National University of Trade and Economics and the University of Auvergne Clermont – 1.

=== Vinnytsia Institute of Trade and Economics of KNUTE ===
The Institute comprises 3 faculties: Accounting and Finance; Economics and Management; Commodity Science, Marketing and Tourism. Teaching is provided by 11 departments. The Institute includes 7 Centers: the Center of Postgraduate Education, the Center of Information Technologies and Training Firms, the Pre-University Training Center, the Center of Preparation of Scientific and Educational and Methodological Editions, the Cultural Center and the Department of French-Ukrainian Institute of Management. Vinnytsia Institute of Trade and Economics trains specialists for a bachelor's degree, a Specialist degree and a master's degree in 12 fields of study: Philology; Economic Cybernetics; International Economy; Economy of an Enterprise; Marketing; Finance and Credit; Accounting and Audit; Commodity Science and Trade Entrepreneurship; Management; Hotel and Restaurant Business; Tourism; Food Technologies and Engineering.

=== Kharkiv Institute of Trade and Economics of KNUTE ===
is a leading educational establishment in the region training professionals for the non-production field of the economy (trade and services, financial system, customs service). Two faculties and eight departments provide training in 10 fields of specialism. More than 2000 students are taught in the institute (the full-time department and correspondence department). The Economic Faculty, the Faculty of Trade, the Faculty of Hotel, Restaurant and Tourism Business train students for a bachelor's degree, a Specialist degree and a master's degree in:

- Economy of an Enterprise
- Marketing
- Finance and Credit
- Accounting and Audit
- Commodity Science and Trade Entrepreneurship
- Commodity Science and Expertise in Customs Service
- Management
- Food Technologies and Engineering
- Hotel and Restaurant Business
- Tourism

The Pre-University and Career Training Center operates in the institute.

=== Uzhhorod Institute of Trade and Economics of KNUTE ===
is a leading educational establishment in the region providing training specialists for tourism business, hotel and restaurant industry, trade, health resorts and other objects of the recreational infrastructure of Transcarpathia. The institute offers a bachelor's degree and a specialist degree in three fields of science: Economics and Entrepreneurship; Management and Administration; Food Industry and Agricultural Product Processing.

The total number of students is more than 1300.

=== Chernivtsi Institute of Trade and Economics of KNUTE ===
is one of the leading scientific and educational centers in the Western region of Ukraine.

Training is carried out by 4 faculties comprising 13 departments. The Institute includes the following centers: the Postgraduate Center that provides a second higher education and refresher courses; Kolomyia Studying and Consulting Center; Chernivtsi Department of French Institute of Management where students can get parallel European education and receive state-recognized diplomas (France). Chernivtsi Institute of Trade and Economics trains specialists for trade, financial establishments and banks, state treasury authorities, marketing area, hotel and tourism complexes, restaurant business enterprises, international organizations in the following fields of study: Management

- Tourism
- Economic Cybernetics
- International Economy
- Finance and Credit
- Accounting and Audit
- Marketing
- Economy of an Enterprise
- Commodity Science and Trade Entrepreneurship
- Food Technologies and Engineering.

=== Burshtyn College of Trade and Economics of KNUTE ===
trains staff in the fields of specialism: cook, waiter; cook, pastry-cook; electrician of trade and refrigerator equipment; foodstuffs seller, head cashier; typesetting operator, clerk (accounting); tourism organization agent, maid, manager; restaurant service supervisor; cook (5 category); pastry-cook (5 category). The institute has trained about 15, 000 specialists for trade and catering since its establishment. They work in different parts of Ukraine. Since the institute has a substantial material and technical base and experienced staff it has created good conditions for training junior specialists in the following fields of specialism:

- Service Organization in Restaurant Business Establishments
- Foodstuffs Production
- Service Organization in Hotels.

=== Vinnytsia College of Trade and Economics of KNUTE ===
is a leading educational establishment of the first level of accreditation on Podillia training students for a junior specialist degree. Study is funded by the government or legal entities and individuals. After finishing the ninth form (on the basis of incomplete secondary education) one can be trained in:

- Commodity Science and Commercial Activity (the full-time and correspondence departments)
- Accounting (the full-time and correspondence departments)
- Finance and Credit
- Food Products Production

A language laboratory was created for the study of foreign languages. The college has a range of sports facilities available to students including a gym, a sports ground etc. The sports facilities are used for a range of College Sports Club Activities (basketball, volleyball, table tennis, mini football).

=== Kolomiya College of Economics and Law of KNUTE ===
is a higher state educational institution of the I-II level of accreditation, a structural subdivision of the Kyiv National University of Trade and Economics. The college forms specialists on state orders, contracts with entities and individuals for industrial enterprises and organizations and service sector. Kolomiya College of Economics and Law provides training of the specialists at the educational level of junior specialist. Training is carried out at the full-day department and by correspondence (combining with work) by a combination of these forms. Students get training in three majors and 7 specialties:

- Law;
- Economics and Business (finance and credit, accounting);
- Service sector (organization of services in hotels, organizing services in the restaurant industry and commerce, merchandising and commercial activities, information activities of the enterprise).

In addition, the college provides education related to working professions: a waiter (skill level: grade3-5) and bartender (skill level: category4).

=== The College of Trade and Economics of KNUTE ===
is a leading university level of the II level of accreditation in Kyiv, which provides training of bachelors and junior specialists for disciplines "Economics and Entrepreneurship" (junior specialists training majoring: "Information activities of the company", "Marketing activities", "Finance and Credit", "Appraisal activities", "Accounting", "Commodity and commercial activities"), "Service Industry" (junior specialists training majoring "Restaurant services", "Travel services"), "Management and Administration" (bachelors training majoring "International Management", "Management and Administration ").

=== Kharkiv College of Trade and Economics of KNUTE ===
is engaged in fundamental training of highly qualified specialists in the business area on modern specialties for enterprises of different ownership types. Within the college there are four departments: Economics and Entrepreneurship, Food technology, Hotel and Restaurant business; Department of working professionals training. The training is provided in two forms: full-time and part-time (correspondence). The specialists training is carried out on the finance by the state budget; by the legal entities and private individuals for the following specialties:

- Business Economics;
- Commercial activity;
- Finance and credit;
- Accounting;
- Manufacture of food products;
- Storage, preservation and processing of meat;
- Restaurant service;
- Travel services.

The college provides a large number of internships in Kharkiv where the students gain practical skills in their future profession. Every summer the students have the opportunity to have an internship in the resorts of the Crimea.

=== Khmelnitsky College of Trade and Economics of KNUTE ===
provides training of future professionals for trade, restaurants, commercial organizations, budget organizations and institutions at the qualification level of junior specialist majoring in:

- Documentation and Information (proceedings);
- Finance and Credit (finance and credit, evaluation activities);
- Marketing (commercial activities);
- Commodity and trade business (commodity and commercial activities);
- Food Technology and Engineering (food processing).

Material and technical base of the college includes two modern buildings equipped with classrooms and auditoriums, computer laboratories, a library with a reading room, conference and sports hall. The college graduates can work in the field of trading and in restaurant business, in financial and market institutions at the positions of an economist, an accountant, an auditor, an inspector, a technologist, the head of production, a chef, a cook of the fifth category etc.

=== Yalta College of Trade and Economics of KNUTE ===
provides social and individual needs of the city of Yalta in obtaining the educational qualification "junior specialist" by the school graduates, as well as their further education by the training programme of "bachelor-master" in KNUTE and in the other universities of III-IV accreditation levels. Areas of training:

- Commodity and commercial activity;
- Commercial activity;
- Manufacture of food products.

=== Higher Commercial College of KNUTE ===
has experience in training of personnel for trade, restaurants and food. Higher Commercial College of KNUTE trains specialists on the basis of secondary education or basic general education to obtain the following professions:

- Seller food, non-food products;
- Seller of food products;
- Window dresser;
- Cook;
- Confectioner;
- Line operator in the production of food;
- Bartender-waiter;

and junior specialists on the basis of working qualification in the field of:

- Commodity and commercial activity;
- Commercial activity;
- Manufacture of food products;
- Restaurant service.

The students may take part in working groups of amateur and sports clubs, theater studio that due to the surveys of the contests in amateur circles was awarded the diploma of the laureate.

=== Chernivtsi Higher Commercial College of KNUTE ===
is a state subdivision of the Kyiv National University of Trade and Economics of the II accreditation level. The college provides education for primary training, retraining of workforce and forms staff for trade and restaurant service. Working professions:

- Manufacture of food products;
- Cook;
- Cook, confectioner;
- Confectioner, cook;
- Cook, waiter, bartender;
- Seller of consumer goods, seller of food products;
- Waiter, bartender;
- Tourist agent;
- Seller of food products;
- Seller of consumer goods.

=== Uzhhorod Higher Commercial College of KNUTE ===
provides training of skilled specialists in 12 licensed professions in such areas as:

- Common to all sectors of the economy – accounting and registration data clerk;
- Service sector – hairdresser (hair stylist), manicure and pedicure specialists, makeup artist, makeup artist-stylist, stylist, maid, duty man on the floor (hotel, camping, pension), administrator, agent of tourism;
- Clothing manufacture – seamstress, tailor, cutter;
- Art and crafts – carver;
- Carpentry – carpenter.

The college created the conditions for the mobility of students, the development of professional aptitudes and abilities through the involvement of the students into technical creativity, artistic performances. Student's theater of fashion is a regular participant of mass art events held within the city, district, region: youth festivals of designers "Art Revolution", contest "Future couture", "New color", "Fair trades", and the other art festivals of professional and technical schools.

In order to promote the psychological and physical health of students the college holds regularly athletic events, competitions at city and regional levels in athletics, volleyball, football, table tennis, checkers, chess etc., where students take the first places.

== University Edition ==
The University Center of teaching publications, equipped with modern facilities full color printing, computer equipment and the latest publishing software that provides a high level of printing production of printed products. It has a staff of highly qualified editors, other personnel. His main task is publishing and providing students and teachers with textbooks, teaching materials, other teaching literature. Each year over 500 titles published works.

It seems scientific journal «Herald of KNUTE» and international scientific-practical journal «Commodities and Markets». The journal «Herald of KNUTE» VAK Ukraine Ukraine registered as a scientific specialized edition of Economic Sciences. Kyiv National University of Trade and Economics from March 2000, publishes the newspaper «University and Time».

Center of teaching publications has the opportunity to realize the publication that prints, higher educational institutions of Ukraine.

== Honorary Doctors ==
- Honorary Doctor of Kyiv National University of Trade and Economics (KNUTE) (2002) Daysaku Ikeda is a Japanese thinker, philosopher, writer, poet and pedagogue.
- Honorary Doctor of Kyiv National University of Trade and Economics (KNUTE) (2002) Maurice Jean Chenevois is a Director of Professional Institute of Management and Administration of the University of Auvergne Clermont 1 (France).
- Honorary Doctor of KNUTE (2007) Ryszard Borowiecki – Rector of Kraków University of Economics (Poland), professor, recognized scholar in the field of modern economic science.
- Honorary Doctor of KNUTE Alessandro Anastasi.
- Honorary Doctor of KNUTE (2012) Anry Zholles is the Director of the development of European School of Management ESCP-Europe.
- Honorary Doctor of KNUTE (2012) Baburin Sergei Nikolayevych.

== Awards and reputation ==
KNUTE constantly ranks high in the rankings of educational institutions in Ukraine. In 2012 – the fifth place in terms of training business economic disciplines, the seventh place in overall ranking by "Compass", the ninth rated by employers, the tenth place rated by experts (according to www.yourcompass.org and "Correspondent" magazine in April 2012).

The university features in the Webometrics Ranking of World Universities (2016) at 6,569 in the world and a leading academic institution in Ukraine.

In 2025, according to the international QS World University Rankings by Subject 2025 in the field of "Social Sciences and Management" in the direction of "Economics and Econometrics" it received Rank 551-700 in the world (it entered the TOP-5 best universities in Ukraine and became one of 10 Ukrainian HEI included in the rating).

== See also ==
- List of universities in Ukraine

== Literature ==
- Мазаракі, А.А.; Пиріг, О.А.; Скирда, Т.І.; Кучеренко, В.Д.; Притуляк, П.П.; Губицький, Л.В. (2006). Історія Київського національного торговельно-економічного університету. К.: Київ. нац. торг.-екон. ун-т. p. 264.
