= Heorhiy Kirpa =

Ukrainian bureaucrat and politician (1946–2004)

Hero of Ukraine Heorhiy Kirpa
- Георгій Кірпа
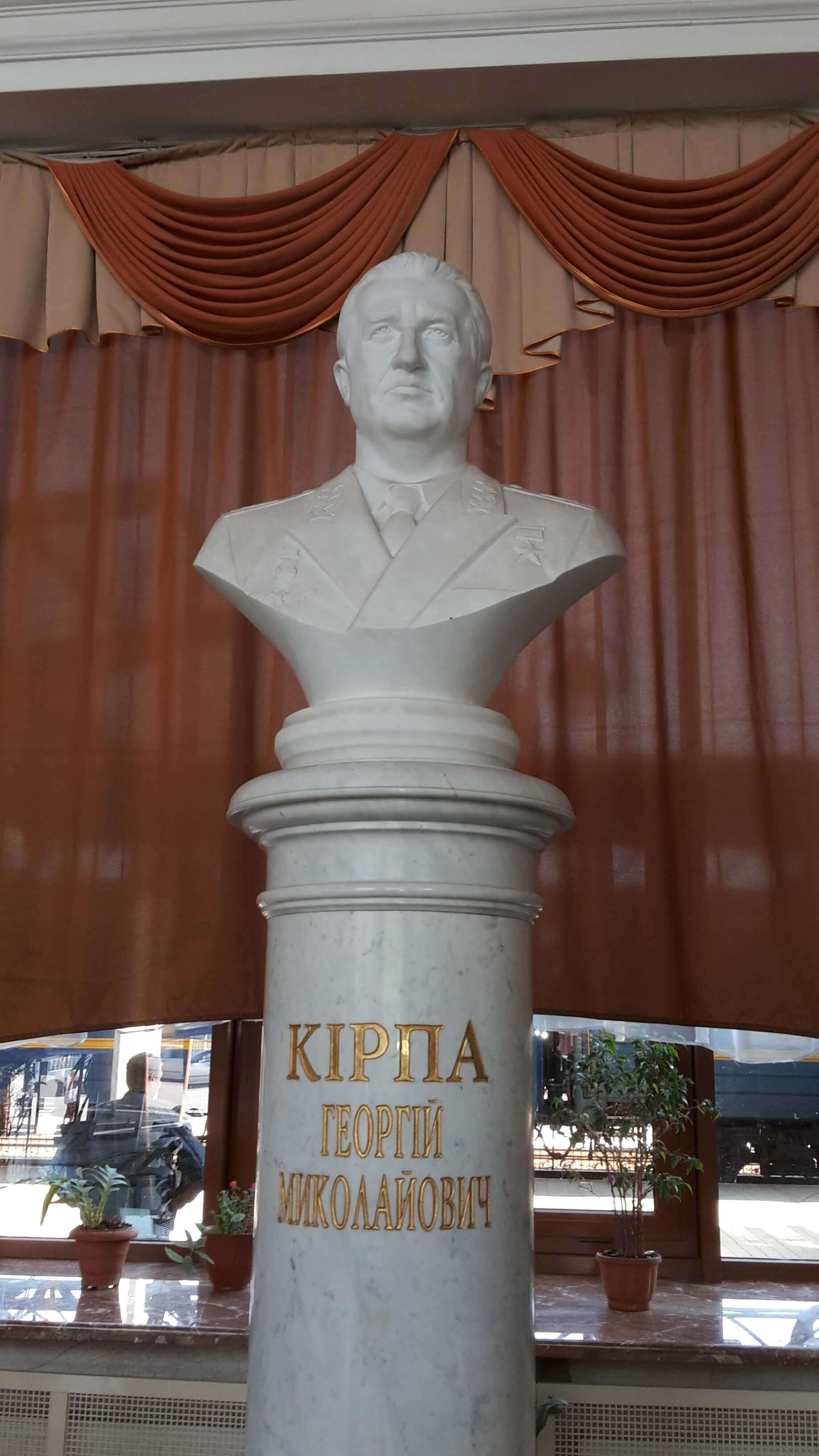
- A bust of Kirpa at Uzhhorod railway station

Minister of Transportation and Telecommunications
- In office 11 May 2002 – 27 December 2004
- President: Leonid Kuchma
- Prime Minister: Anatoliy Kinakh; Viktor Yanukovych
- Preceded by: Valeriy Pustovoitenko
- Succeeded by: Yevhen Chervonenko

Personal details
- Born: 20 July 1946 Klubivka, Ukrainian SSR, Soviet Union
- Died: 27 December 2004 (aged 58) Bortnychi, Kyiv, Ukraine
- Cause of death: Suicide by gunshot
- Party: Revival
- Other political affiliations: Social Democratic Party of Ukraine (united); For United Ukraine!
- Education: Kharkiv Institute of Railway Transport Engineers
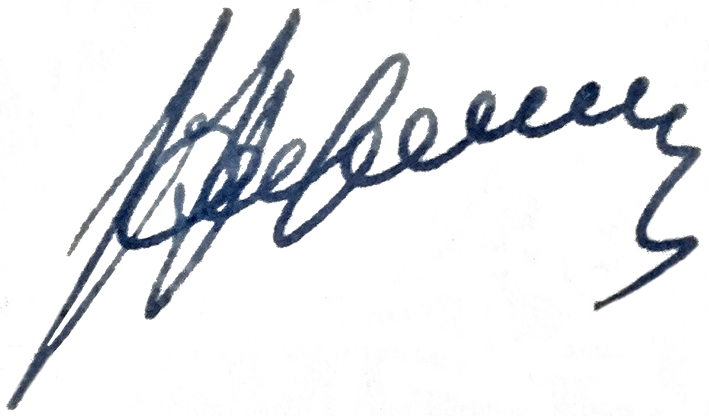
- Signature

Heorhiy Mykolaiovych Kirpa (Ukrainian: Георгій Миколайович Кірпа; 20 July 1946 – 27 December 2004) was a Ukrainian bureaucrat and politician who was Minister of Transportation and Telecommunications from 2002 to 2004, during the presidency of Leonid Kuchma. He was also the head of the Ukrzaliznytsia national railway company. Under Kirpa, Ukraine's public transportation was revived and expanded after years of neglect and corruption, with the completion of several mega-projects and the expansion of rail and motor transit. He was accused of engaging in corruption, and died under unclear circumstances during the 2004 Orange Revolution, allegedly by suicide.

== Early life and career ==
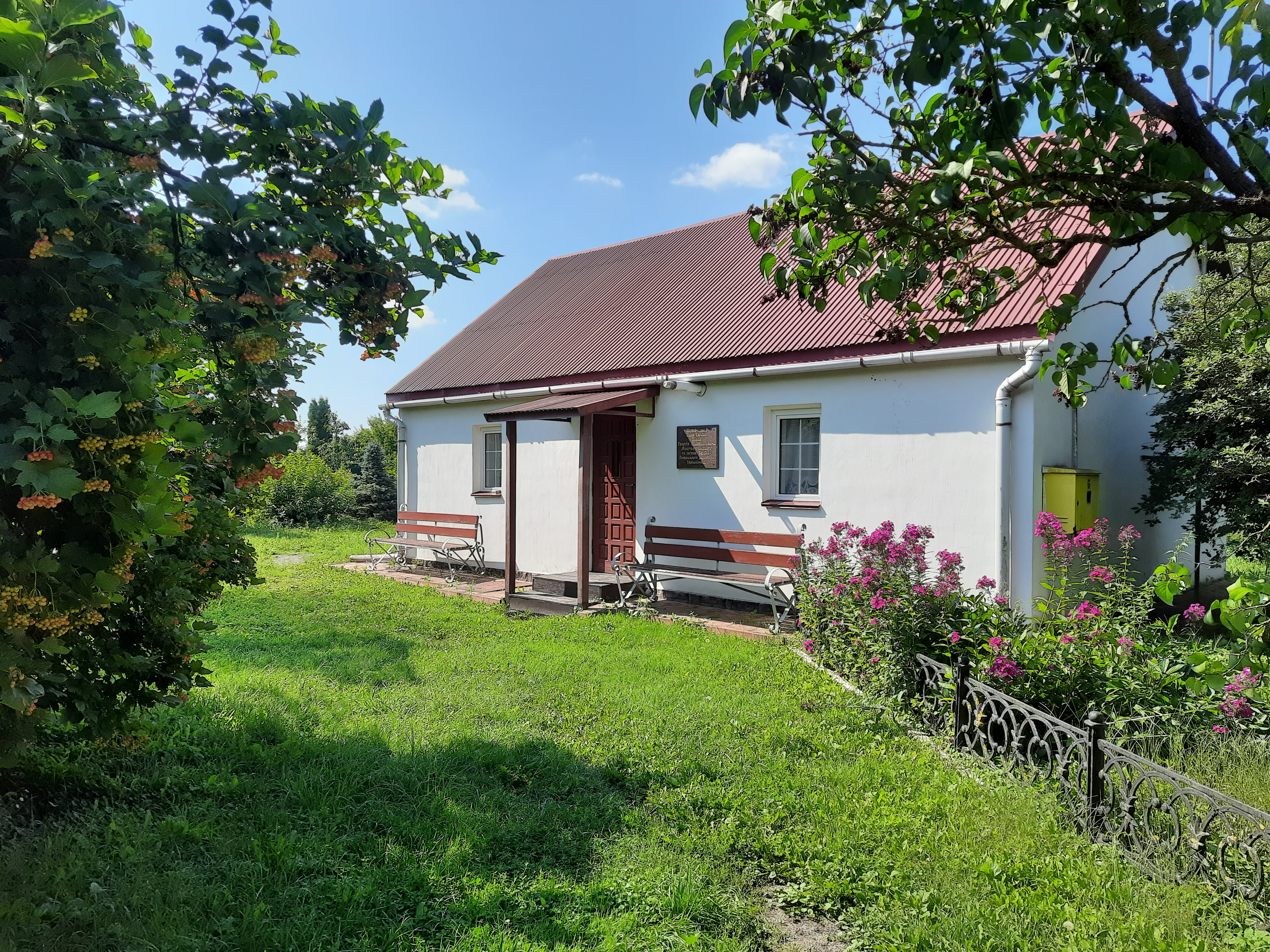
Kirpa's birth house in Klubivka, now a museum

Heorhiy Mykolaiovych Kirpa was born on 20 July 1946 in the village of Klubivka, Khmelnytskyi Oblast, then part of the Soviet Union. As a child, one of his school colleagues was Vasyl Zinkevych, who would later be known as a singer. From 1965 to 1970 he studied at the Kharkiv Institute of Railway Transport Engineers (now the Ukrainian State University of Railway Transport). He served in the Soviet Army from 1970 to 1971, being stationed in Yaroslavl.

== Political career ==
Kirpa was one of the most influential members of Leonid Kuchma's government and a supporter of Viktor Yanukovych. He was a high-ranking member of the Social Democratic Party of Ukraine (united), as well as leader of the Revival party, which had a party membership largely comprising railway workers during his time in office. He did not belong to any clan of Ukrainian oligarchs. Kirpa was frequently mentioned as a candidate in the 2004 Ukrainian presidential election, and Holos Ukrayiny journalist Liudmyla Menzhulina claimed in 2009 that "many were those who said" that if he had run, he would have won by a large margin in the first round.

Kirpa's political career was marked by several allegations of corruption; The Kyiv Post noted in an obituary that he oversaw the alleged transfer of Ukrzaliznytsia profits to private companies, and his children were accused by Interpol of using company bank accounts to purchase real estate in Kyiv.

=== Ukrzaliznytsia ===
Kirpa took control of Ukrzaliznytsia, Ukraine's state-owned railway company, in 2000. That year, Ukrzaliznytsia recorded losses of one billion hryvnias. At the time, the position of chief executive officer was widely considered to be a political position whose holders were appointed by government officials in order to gain favour with oligarchs, rather than on the basis of their knowledge of railways. Kirpa launched what The New York Times referred to in 2022 as an "ambitious reconstruction program", including the renovation of several stations, the beginning of an express train service, the expansion of electric trams and the introduction of fibre-optic cables.

Kirpa's work at Ukrzaliznytsia frequently involved billion-dollar mega-projects, including Highway M05, the Bystroye Canal and the New Darnytskyi Bridge, which was colloquially named "Kirpa bridge". Kirpa advocated for the unification of Ukrainian domestic airlines. Under Kirpa's leadership, Ukrzaliznytsia also was responsible for equipment procurement in fields beyond railways, such as batteries for the submarine Zaporizhzhia. The New York Times wrote that Kirpa allegedly received kickbacks from procurement purchases.

On 23 April 2002 he was awarded the title Hero of Ukraine.

=== Minister of Transportation ===
Kirpa was appointed as Minister of Transportation by President Leonid Kuchma c. 11 May 2002. News site ForUm wrote after his appointment that he was a reformist, comparing him to Yulia Tymoshenko. ForUm stated that his policies were likely to be opposed by the Ukrainian coal and steel industries, and noted that Volodymyr Boyko, director of the Illich Steel and Iron Works and a fellow For United Ukraine! politician who had opposed Kirpa's tenure at Ukrzaliznytsia, was likely to find more difficulty in opposing him.

Kirpa's responsibilities as transport minister continued to include extensive public works, including train stations, railways, highways and bridges. He also directed telecommunications as part of his portfolio. Under Kirpa, air, sea and river transit was expanded and a long-awaited system of bus routes to small villages was established.

During the 2004 Ukrainian presidential election Kirpa provided 125 trains to the Party of Regions, the Russian Orthodox Church and private companies supportive of Viktor Yanukovych's electoral campaign. These trains were used to spread propaganda against Viktor Yushchenko and transport fraudulent ballots to polling stations, resulting in as many as over one million extra votes for Yanukovych, according to international monitors. Prior to his death, Kirpa was under investigation as the chief suspect of a voter fraud trial in the 2004 election. He was additionally accused of having illegally financed Yanukovych's campaign.

== Personal life ==
Kirpa was married and had two children, a son and a daughter. He was an avid accordion player.

== Death and legacy ==
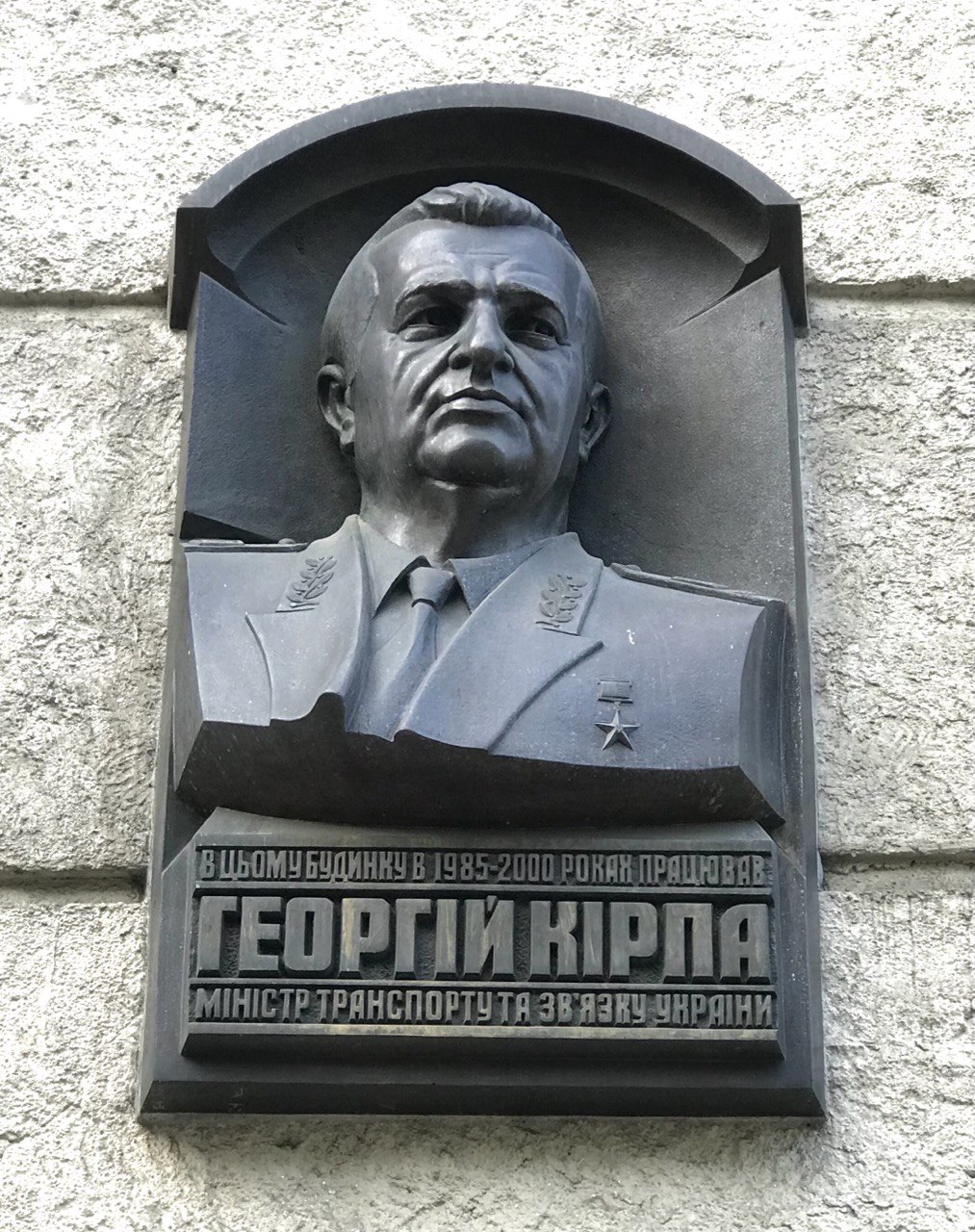
Memorial plaque to Kirpa on the main office of Lviv Railways

Kirpa died by gunshot wound at his dacha in Bortnychi (the outskirt of Kyiv), on 27 December 2004. The cause of the gunshot is disputed; the official version, confirmed by Ukrainian police in January 2005, was that Kirpa committed suicide. Kirpa's death was immediately subject to conspiracy theories that he had been either driven to suicide or murdered as part of a cover-up by Kuchma's government, and an investigation was launched two days after his death. The Kyiv Post posited that Kirpa's death may have been related to his knowledge of the alleged involvement of members of Kuchma's government in crime. The Post wrote that, like Yuriy Kravchenko (another minister who died under mysterious circumstances during the Orange Revolution), Kirpa was considered to be a liability to Kuchma and a potential key witness in investigations of Kuchma's government.

Volodymyr Sabodan, head of the Ukrainian Orthodox Church (Moscow Patriarchate), was present at Kirpa's funeral, and a monument to Kirpa in Klubivka was consecrated by Orthodox priests on 20 July 2009; Kirpa had previously overseen the restoration of the village's monastery. In late December of that year, Southwestern Railways requested that the Kyiv City Council rename Petrozavodsk Street, located in Kyiv's Solomianskyi Raion, to Heorhiy Kirpa Street. A museum dedicated to Kirpa was established in Klubivka in 2010.
