= Skorokhod =

Skorokhod (Russian: Скороход is a Russian surname derived from the word скороход meaning fast walker. Notable people with the surname include:

- Anatoliy Skorokhod
- Anna Skorokhod, Ukrainian politician
