= Chervonenko =

Chervonenko is a Ukrainian surname. The Belarusian form is Charvonenka. Notable people with this surname include:

- Stepan Chervonenko, Russian diplomat
- Yevhen Chervonenko, Ukrainian politician and racing driver

== See also ==
- Chervonenkis
