= Revival (Ukraine) =

Revival Відродження
- Leader: Vitaliy Khomutynnik
- Founder: Heorhiy Kirpa
- Founded: 15 June 2004 (Revival), 27 February 2014 (Economic Development), 5 June 2015 (merger)
- Merger of: Party of Regions
- Succeeded by: For the Future; Kernes Bloc — Successful Kharkiv
- Ideology: Economic nationalism Protectionism; Decentralization; Regionalism; Russophilia
- Political position: Centre
- National affiliation: Opposition Bloc (2019)
- Colours: Yellow Blue
- Verkhovna Rada (2019) (Note: Part of the Opposition Bloc (2019) until 2022.): 6 / 450

Party flag
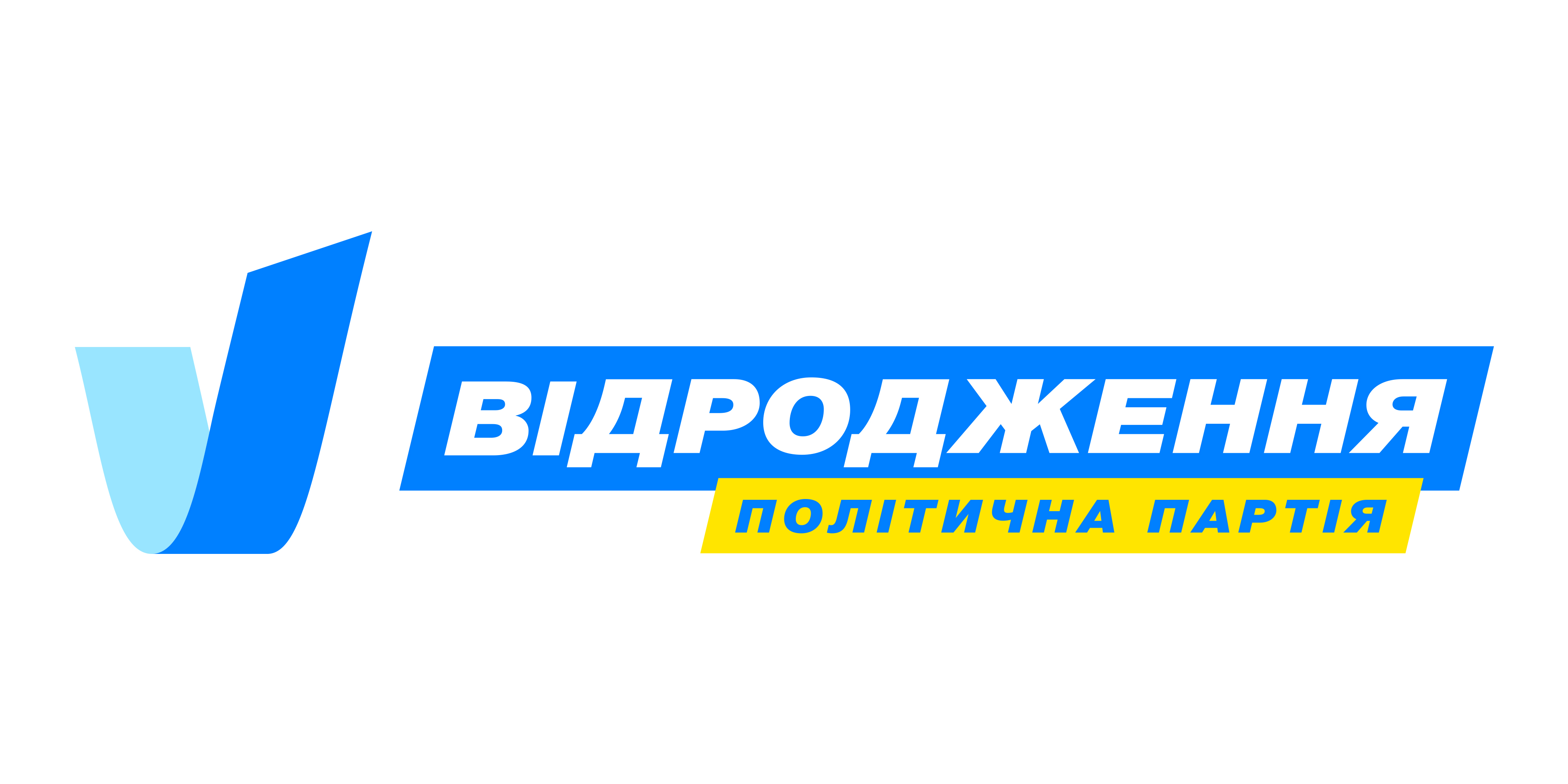

Website
- vidrodzhennya.org.ua

Revival (Ukrainian: «Відродження», romanized: Vidrodzhennia [ʋʲiˈdrɔd͡ʒenʲːɐ], the name can also be translated as Renaissance) is a political party in Ukraine, established in its current form in June 2015. Its predecessor had been founded by Heorhiy Kirpa in 2004.

On 5 June 2015, Revival, not represented in parliament until then, gained 22 of 450 seats in Parliament through a merger with a parliamentary faction of the same name, which was known as Economic Development between February 2014 and March 2015.

In the 2019 Ukrainian parliamentary election the party joined a united party list with the political parties of Opposition Bloc — Party for Peace and Development, Nashi and Trust Deeds. But this combined force did not win any parliamentary seats.

== History ==
=== Revival ===
The party was registered at the Ministry of Justice on 15 June 2004 and its chairman was then Minister of Transportation and Communication and director of Ukrzaliznytsia Heorhiy Kirpa. The party supported Viktor Yanukovych during the 2004 Ukrainian presidential election. Kirpa was found dead on 27 December 2004. Early next month the police concluded he had killed himself.

During the 2006 Ukrainian parliamentary elections the party scored 0.96%, finishing 12th out of 45 participants, and did not gain any parliamentary seats. The party did not participate in the 2007 Ukrainian parliamentary elections and the 2012 Ukrainian parliamentary elections it combated in 8 constituencies without winning a seat.

During the 2014 Ukrainian parliamentary elections the party scored 0.19% and again no seats.

=== Economic development ===
==== Original creation ====
The faction in the Ukrainian parliament Economic Development was created on 27 February 2014 by MP Anatoliy Kinakh who had recently left the Party of Regions faction. The co-leader of the group was elected Vitaliy Khomutynnik.

Initially accounted for 33 deputies, the group included 41 MPs by the end of the seventh parliamentary convocation. Most of them had shortly before been a member of the Party of Regions faction, and many retained their membership within the Party. Kinakh claimed to have created the faction to restart the negotiations with the European Union on the Ukraine–European Union Association Agreement and its Deep and Comprehensive Free Trade Agreement.

On its second day the faction with 250 other MPs sign up to join the coalition supporting the Yatsenyuk Government with the Batkivshchyna, UDAR, Svoboda factions and the Sovereign European Ukraine faction and other MPs.

==== Revived after 2014 parliamentary election ====
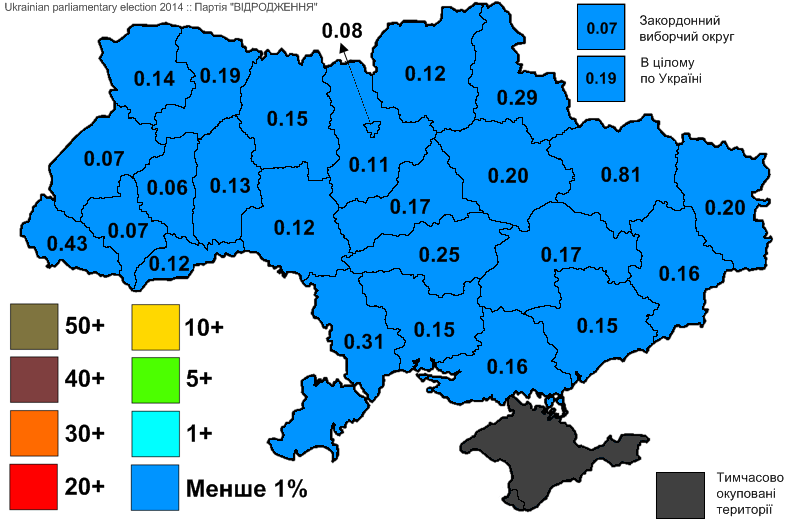
The results of the "Revival" party in the 2014 parliamentary elections

The parliamentary group was revived after the 2014 parliamentary elections in Ukraine. The new leader of the parliamentary group is Vitaliy Khomutynnik. Anatoliy Kinakh had failed to win a seat in the 2014 parliamentary election. In its reincarnation the group has 19 deputies.

=== Merger ===
The Economic Development group was dissolved on 5 March 2015 and re-founded as Revival.

On 5 June 2015, Revival's Party Congress decided to make the faction "Revival" in Ukraine's national parliament Verkhovna Rada the parliamentary wing of the party, effectively merging the two. Revival MP Viktor Bondar was elected party chairman. The faction Revival has 22 of the parliaments 450 seats. By the summer of 2015 most representatives of the party in 2014 were members of the Party of Regions.

=== Post-merger history ===
The party performed badly in the 2015 Ukrainian local elections, but generally won elections in Kharkiv Oblast. In Kharkiv, Ukraine's second-largest city, Incumbent Mayor Hennadiy Kernes was Revival's mayoral candidate in the Kharkiv mayoral election. Former Prime Minister of Ukraine Yuriy Yekhanurov was the party's candidate for Mayor of Kyiv. In the 2015 Kharkiv mayoral election Kernes was re-elected with 65.8% of the votes. In the Kyiv 2015 local elections Yekhanurov did not survive the first round of Mayoral elections. In the same election Bohdan Andriyiv was elected Mayor of Uzhhorod. In total the party won 1,733 seats of the available 158,399 in the local elections.

On January 30, 2019, the party nominated Viktor Bondar for the 2019 presidential election. However, in the elections, Viktor Bondar received 0.12% of the vote, finishing 16th.

On June 2, 2019, the Revival party (Hennadiy Kernes and Vitaliy Khomutynnik) and Trust Deeds (Gennadiy Trukhanov) held a unification congress for general participation in the parliamentary elections. As a result of the congress, on June 7, the Revival party was left by its co-chairman Viktor Bondar "due to the transformation of the Revival project into a project for the revival of the Party of Regions." In the 2019 Ukrainian parliamentary election the party joined a united party list with the political parties of Opposition Bloc — Party for Peace and Development, Nashi and Trust Deeds called Opposition Bloc. In this election this list won 6 single-seat constituencies and its nationwide list won 3.23% of the votes meaning it did not overcome the 5% election barrier.

After the defeat in the 2019 parliamentary elections, many members of the party and its ex-co-chairman Viktor Bondar, having been elected in single-mandate districts, flowed into the For the Future project aimed at supporting President Volodymyr Zelenskyy.

Hennadiy Kernes, refused to go to the 2020 Ukrainian local elections with Revival and instead created his own political project Kernes Bloc — Successful Kharkiv.

In the 2020 Ukrainian local elections the party gained no deputies.

== Election results ==
Original party

Year	Votes	%	Seats won	+/–	Government
2006	245,188	0.99%	0 / 450	New	Extra-parliamentary
2007	Did not participate				
2012	Unsuccessfully participated in 8 constituencies		0 / 450	Steady	Extra-parliamentary
2014	31,201	0.20%	0 / 450	Steady	Extra-parliamentary

After merger with Opposition Bloc — Party for Peace and Development

Year	Votes	%	Seats won	+/–	Government
2019	443,195	3.03%	6 / 450	▲6	Opposition

== See also ==
- Politics of Ukraine
- Party of Regions
- Opposition Bloc
- Our Land (Ukraine)
- For the Future
- Kernes Bloc — Successful Kharkiv
