= Viktor Bondar =

Ukrainian politician (born 1975)

- Віктор Бондар
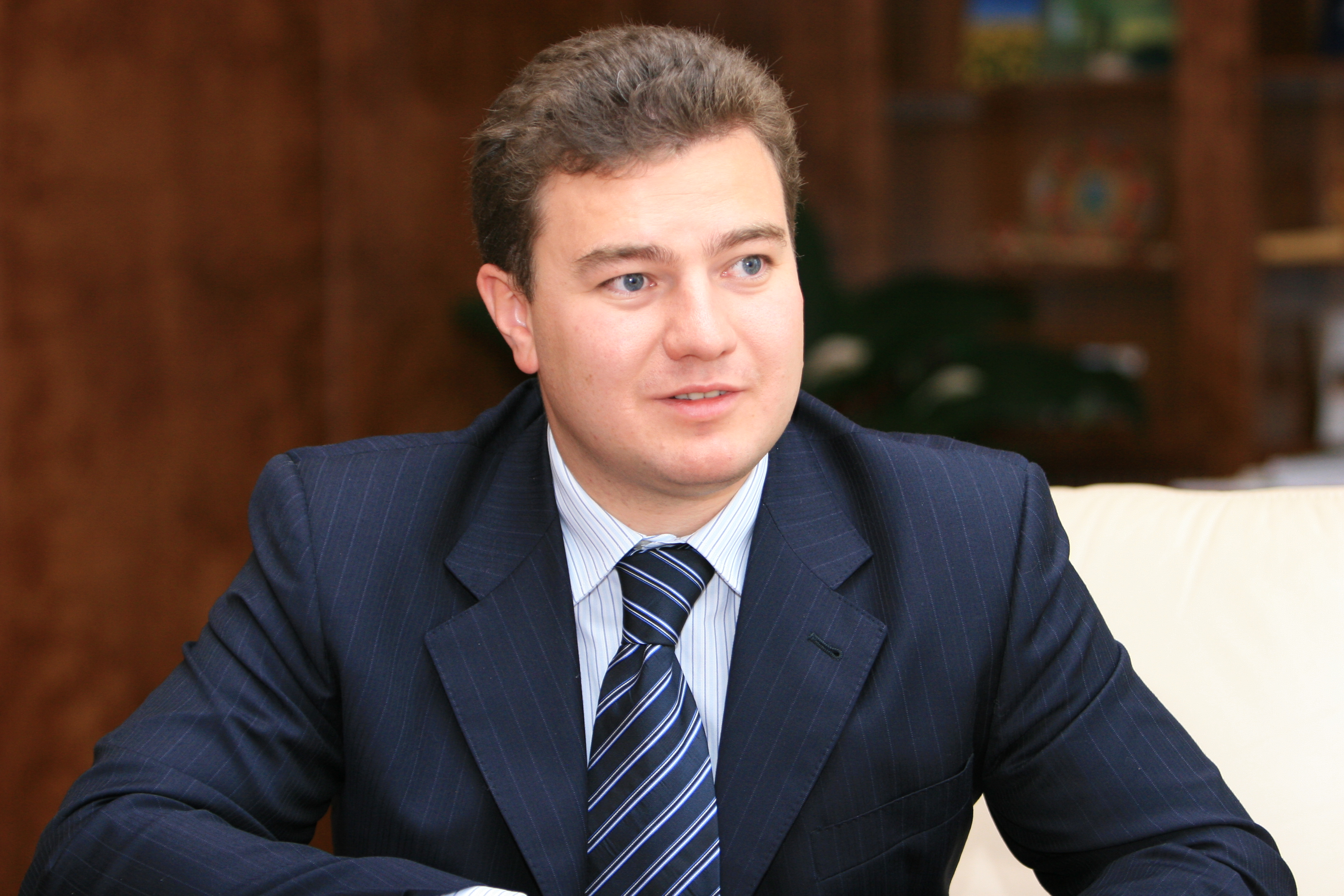
- Bondar in 2007

Chairman of the Revival Party
- Incumbent
- Assumed office 5 June 2015

Minister of Transport and Communication of Ukraine
- In office 28 September 2005 – 4 August 2006
- President: Viktor Yushchenko
- Preceded by: Yevhen Chervonenko
- Succeeded by: Mykola Rudkovsky

Governor of Dnipropetrovsk Oblast
- In office 10 December 2007 – 4 February 2010
- Preceded by: Nadiya Deyeva
- Succeeded by: Semen Krol (acting)

People's Deputy of Ukraine

7th convocation
- In office 15 December 2012 – 2014
- Constituency: Non-partisan, 191st electoral district

8th convocation
- In office June 2014 – present
- Constituency: Non-partisan, 191st electoral district

Personal details
- Born: November 5, 1975 (age 51) Leningrad, Russian SFSR, Soviet Union
- Children: Nikita (2001); Daria (2005); Maxim (2008); Kirill (2010)

Viktor Vasylyovych Bondar (Ukrainian: Ві́ктор Васи́льович Бо́ндар [ˈwiktor wɐˈsɪlʲowɪdʒ ˈbɔndɐr]; Russian: Виктор Васильевич Бондарь, romanized: Viktor Vasil'evich Bondar) (born 1975) is a Ukrainian politician, a member of Ukrainian parliament (Verkhovna Rada) of the 7th and 8th and 9th convocations, the Minister of Transport and Communication of Ukraine (2005–2006), and the Head of Dnipropetrovsk Regional State Administration (2007–2010).

Since June 5, 2015, Victor Bondar has been the chairman of the political party Revival. On September 5, 2017, he became the head of the parliamentary group of the Revival party. After the 2019 Ukrainian parliamentary election Bondar became co-faction leader of the parliamentary group "For the Future". Since July 2022 non-factional People's Deputy of Ukraine.

== Biography ==
Viktor Bondar was born on November 5, 1975, in Dashkivtsi, Vinkivtsi Raion, Ukrainian SSR of the Soviet Union. In 1997, he graduated from the Yaroslav the Wise Law Academy of Ukraine, majoring in legal science. In 2004, he graduated from Kyiv Polytechnic Institute, majoring in information management system and technologies (computer system analysis).

He received an academic degree (candidate) of juridical sciences (Doctor of Law).

- In 1993–1996, he founded and managed the legal firm Stalker, along with a partner.
- In 1996–1997, legal advisor of the President of Sigma Financial and Industrial Group JSC (Kharkiv).
- In 1997–1999, Deputy Director of the European Development Fund LLC (Kharkiv).
- In 1999–2000, Chairman of the Board of Donetsk Meat Processing Plant OJSC.
- From July to September 2000, Vice-President of Ukrainian Communications LLC (Kyiv).
- In 2000–2005, Head of the Information Resources Center under the Internal Policy Department, Deputy Director of the Department of Communications with Verkhovna Rada (parliament) of Ukraine, Head of Administrator of Information Resources and Technologies Development Strategy under the Secretary of the Cabinet of Ministers of Ukraine.

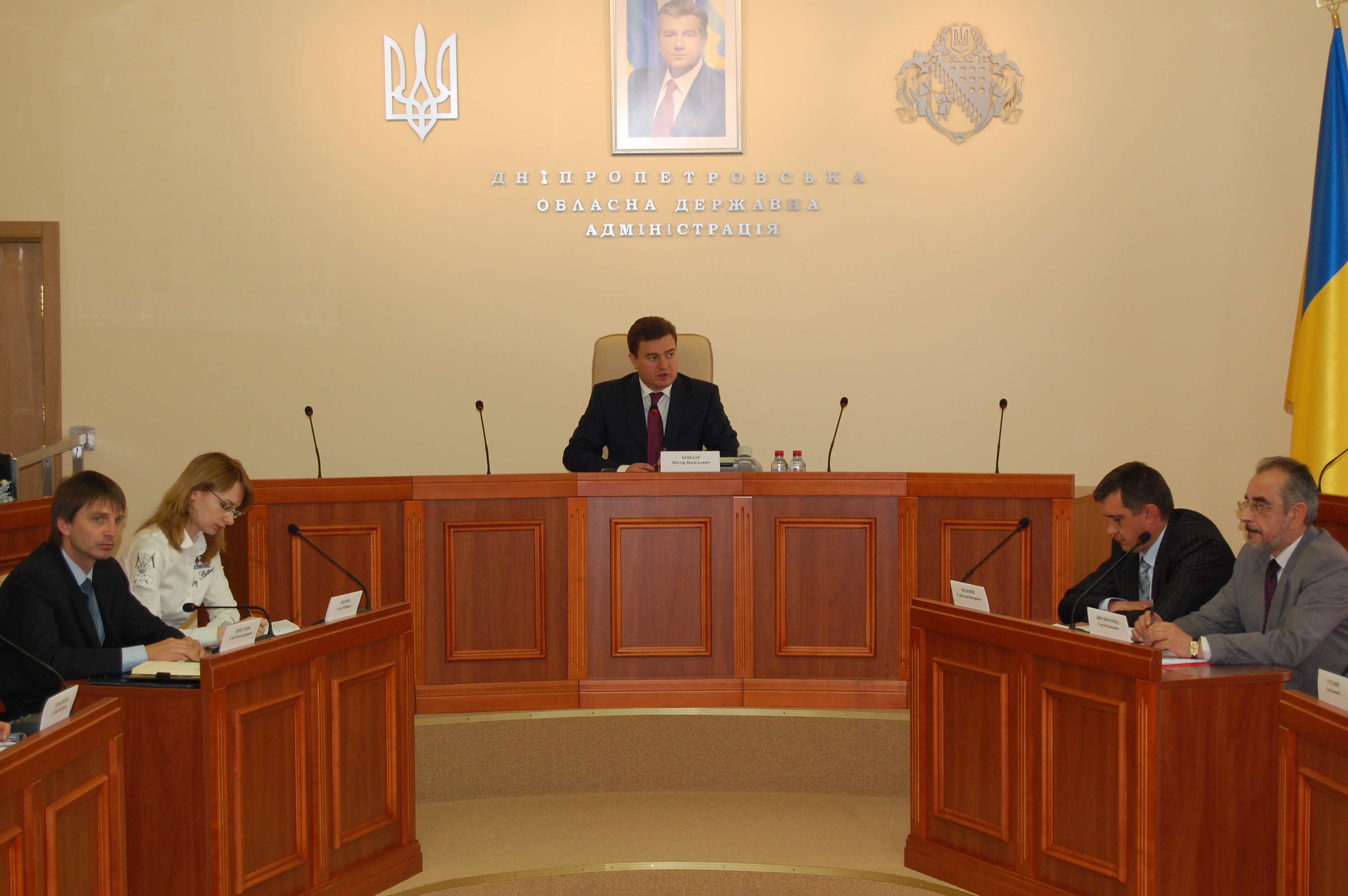
Working meeting at the Dnipropetrovsk Regional Administration, 2009

- From June to September 2005, he acted as the First Deputy Minister of Transport and Communication of Ukraine.
- From 28 September 2005 to 4 August 2006, he was Minister of Transport and Communication of Ukraine in the Yekhanurov Government.
- From September 2006 to September 2007 Deputy of Viktor Baloha, Head of the Secretariat of the President of Ukraine; in charge of regional and personnel policy.
- From September to December 2007, acting Governor of Dnipropetrovsk Oblast.
- From December 2007 to February 4, 2010, officially became Governor of Dnipropetrovsk Oblast. In 2007, 32-year Viktor Bondar was the 161st most influential Ukrainian according to national newsweekly Focus. Before dismissal from this office, deputies of Dnipropetrovsk Oblast Council expressed distrust to Viktor Bondar. He openly declared his support to the Prime Minister Yulia Tymoshenko during the campaign for the presidency, while the majority of votes at the Dnipropetrovsk Oblast Council were held by the Party of Regions, whose leader Viktor Yanukovych was her rival
- From May 2010 to March 15, 2011, Deputy of Ihor Kaletnyk, Chief of the State Customs Service of Ukraine.

On March 17, 2011, he was appointed Director of the Organization and Management Department under the State Customs Service of Ukraine. [2] After winning a constituency in Khmelnytsky Oblast in 2012 he was elected into the Ukrainian parliament Verkhovna Rada as an independent candidate. Once in parliament, he joined the Party of Regions faction. On February 19, 2014, Vikor Bondar left the Party of Regions faction. He stated he made his decision after The Security Service of Ukraine in Khmelnytsky Oblast fired guns at Euromaidan protesters. After retiring, Viktor Bondar with other members of parliament founded a new parliament faction Sovereign European Ukraine. In October of 2014 Ukrainian parliamentary election, Bondar was re-elected into the Ukrainian parliament as a non-partisan after winning a single-member districts seat in Starokostiantyniv with 18.61% of the votes. Within parliament, he joined the parliamentary group Revival. On June 5, 2015, it was decided that this faction, group of the party "Revival," would be the parliamentary wing of the Revival party. Bondar was elected Revival party chairman. In September 2017, Victor Bondar became the head of the parliamentary group of the party "Revival" in the Parliament of Ukraine.

In the 2019 Ukrainian parliamentary election Bondar was re-elected again as an independent candidate in districts 191, with a meager margin. In parliament he became co-faction leader of the parliamentary group "For the Future", consisting of 23 parliamentarians. Since July 2022 non-factional People's Deputy of Ukraine

== Legislation activity ==
Law Number	Date of Registration	Law Title
2077а	21 May 2013	On changes in the Article 41 of the Criminal Code of Ukraine on Summary Offences (employer responsibility for brokes of equal pay for males and females)
2144а	27 May 2013	On 95 anniversary of twice Hero of Socialist Labour Grigory Tkachuk
2335а	18 June 2013	On changes in Law of Ukraine 'On state budget of Ukraine in 2013' (concerning grape, fruits and hop industries)
2459	5 March 2013	On changes in Law of Ukraine 'On grain and grain market of Ukraine' (concerning grain market deregulation)
2583а	12 July 2013	On changes in Tax Code of Ukraine (concerning tax duties in situations of agricultural lands leasing and improvements of some tax regulations)
2673	1 April 2013	On changes in Law of Ukraine 'On Electric Power Industry' (concerning electrical power for agriculture companies)
3198	5 September 2013	On changes in Law of Ukraine 'On State Support of Book Publishing in Ukraine'
3199	5 September 2013	On changes in Custom Code of Ukraine (concerning aligning of privileges for customs duties for imported products)
3298	19 September 2013	On changes in some Ukrainian laws concerning audit activity
3421	16 October 2013	On changes in Land Code of Ukraine (concerning the improvement of passing algorithm for land lots marked out for public communities)

== Career ==
From March 1996 to September 2000 worked as legal adviser to financial-industrial group "Sigma" (Kharkov), Deputy Director of the European Development Fund (Kharkiv), Chairman of the JSC "Donetsk Meat" (Donetsk ); Vice-President Ltd. "Ukrainian communications" (Kyiv).

From September 2000 to July 2005 he worked in the Cabinet of Ministers of Ukraine as the head of the Center for Information Resources, Deputy Head of the Department of Information Resources, Head of Development Strategy of Information Resources and Technology Department of internal policy, the Deputy Director of Relations with Parliament of Ukraine and monitoring information.

In 2005-2006 he headed the Ministry of Transport and Communications of Ukraine.

From September 2006 to September 2007 he worked as Deputy Head of Presidential Secretariat of Ukraine.

From September 2007 to February 2010 led the Dnipropetrovsk regional state administration.

From 2010 to 2012 he worked as Deputy Chairman of the State Customs Service of Ukraine.

In 2012 he was elected Deputy of the Parliament of Ukraine.

In 2014 he was elected Deputy of the Parliament of Ukraine.

Beginning in 2015, he ist the head of the Party «Vidrodzhennya» and of the deputy group «Vidrodzhennya».

Viktor Bondar became a presidential candidate in 2019.

In the 2019 Ukrainian parliamentary election Bondar was re-elected again as an independent candidate in districts 191, with a meager margin.[18] In parliament he became co-faction leader of the parliamentary group "For the Future", consisting of 23 parliamentarians.[3] Since July 2022 non-factional People's Deputy of Ukraine

== Political views ==
From July 2008 to April 2009 he was the deputy leader of the party «United Centre», the creation initiative of which belonged to the head of the administration of President Yushchenko — Viktor Baloha. Having organized the financing of a party cell in the Dnipropetrovsk Oblast as a result of contradictions about the role of the party in the presidential election, I wrote a letter of withdrawal from the party [2].

After the First Round of the Ukrainian presidential election, 2010 (when President Yushchenko won only about 5% of the vote) in January 2010, Viktor Bondar began working to the victory of Yulia Tymoshenko, despite the fact that President Viktor Yushchenko actually worked to the victory of Yanukovych, calling on «the orange voter» to vote «against all» («the orange voter » could potentially vote precisely for Tymoshenko, and not for Yanukovych, so Yushchenko's appeal «against all» was precisely harm for Tymoshenko). February 4, 2010 President Yushchenko fired Viktor Bondar from his post as governor (the Head of the Dnipropetrovsk Regional State Administration) — the decisive Second Round of the Ukrainian presidential election, 2010 took place on February 7. And Bondar also noted that his dismissal from the post of the Head of the Regional State Administration was absolutely political and connected with the refusal to help Yushchenko-Yanukovych during the presidential elections [3].

May 26, 2010 the Cabinet of Ministers introduced the additional post of the deputy Head of the State Customs Service of Ukraine (already had six deputies) and appointed Viktor Bondar to the post according to the quota of the Communist Party of Ukraine, which was a part of the ruling coalition with the «Party of Regions»[4].

June 16, 2010 (when the first arrests of Tymoshenko's comrades began) Victor Bondar made a statement that generally he goes out of politics [5].

Nevertheless, on December 24, 2010, Bondar was arrested - the case was initiated on the grounds of crimes, provided for by Part 5 of Article 27, Part 2 of Article 194 and Article 353 of the Criminal Code of Ukraine (aiding in the deliberate destruction of another's property, inflicted property damage on a particularly large scale, associated with the unauthorized granting of authority). Most experts are inclined to believe that the arrest was politically motivated and illegal. Victor Bondar was accused of complicity in the deliberate destruction of the unfinished construction of the bus terminal «Teremky» in Kyiv in 2006 (then Bondar worked in the Yekhanurov government in the position of Deputy Transport Minister of Yevhen Chervonenko), that his actions caused losses to the state in the amount of more than five and a half million hryvnias (that is, about $1 million)[6]. Prosecutor General Pshonka commented that his arrest as evidence that «the power of Yanukovych» arrests not only oppositionists, but also «officials of his government» [7]. Thus, Pshonka tried to justify the criminal actions of the then government and to divert attention from the «political» arrests of the opposition.

Bondar was under arrest for only a few days, and already on December 28, 2010 he was released under «a recognizance not to leave» [8].

Despite the “a recognizance not to leave” and the investigation, Bondar was not relieved of his post as Deputy Head of the Customs Service. March 23, 2011 by decrees of President Yanukovych, Deputies Head of the State Customs Service were dismissed from their posts: Viktor Bondar, Serhiy Somka, Ihor Tymofyeyev, Hennadiy Heorhiyenko, Pavlo Pashko, but all of them, on the orders of the Head of the State Customs Service of Ukraine Ihor Kalietnik, are intended by the directors of the departments of State Customs Service of Ukraine[9]. That is, Bondar continued to work as Director of department of the State Customs Service.

Only on September 27, 2012 it became known that in September 2011 - the case against Bondar was closed «due to a lack of evidence» [10].

In 2011-2012, Bondar did not participate in politics, but in the fall of 2012, Viktor Bondar took a part in the parliamentary elections as an «independent candidate» (registered as a non-partisan self-promoted candidate) — in the majority constituency number 191 in Western Ukraine, in the Khmelnytskyi Oblast [11]. He won the election by defeating the nominee from the Party of Regions, Mykola Derikot the Head of the Khmelnitskyi Regional State Administration [12]. Bondar in the Verkhovna Rada, along with other self-promoted activists Khmelnitskyi joined the Party of Regions. At the same time, Bondar publicly refused to join the Party of Regions itself, and also to give them his deputy card for voting [13].

As of 2013, he combined his parliamentary mandate with entrepreneurial activity.

But, despite the entry into the Party of Regions faction, Viktor Bondar repeatedly voted against the party majority. For example, on January 11, 2013, he voted («together with other seven deputies from the Party of Regions faction») «for the Law on the decriminalization of articles of the Criminal Code, under which Tymoshenko and Lutsenko were convicted» [14]. Perhaps it was his firm and decisive position that provoked hostility towards to him from the side of Yanukovych's entourage.

February 19, 2014 Victor Bondar announced his withdrawal from the Party of Regions faction. He explained his step by saying that during the elections he promised to voters the European course of development of the country. But the country's leadership by its sole decision changed this course to the opposite, which almost provoked a civil war in the country.[15]. After that, Bondar became one of the co-founders of the «Sovereign European Ukraine» deputy group.

October 26, 2014 Victor Bondar won the extraordinary parliamentary elections in a one-standard district No. 191 (Khmelnytskyi Oblast) and he was elected as a people's deputy of Ukraine of the 8th convocation [16]. Bondar in the Verkhovna Rada joined to the deputy group «People's Will ».

From June 5, 2015 — the Head of the political party «Revival».

From September 5, 2017 - the Head of the deputy group «Party „Revival“».

In the 2019 Ukrainian parliamentary election Bondar was re-elected in district № 191 and now he non-factional People's Deputy of Ukraine.

== Private life ==
Viktor Bondar has three sons a daughter and is divorced.

He collects photographs of unusual or funny monuments from all over the world, as well as their miniature figurines. He is also interested in IT technologies.

== References and notes ==
Political offices
Preceded by Yevhen Chervonenko	Minister of Transport and Communication of Ukraine; 2005–2006	Succeeded by Mykola Rudkovsky
