= Pavel Fuks =

Ukrainian oligarch (born 1971)

- Павло Якович Фукс
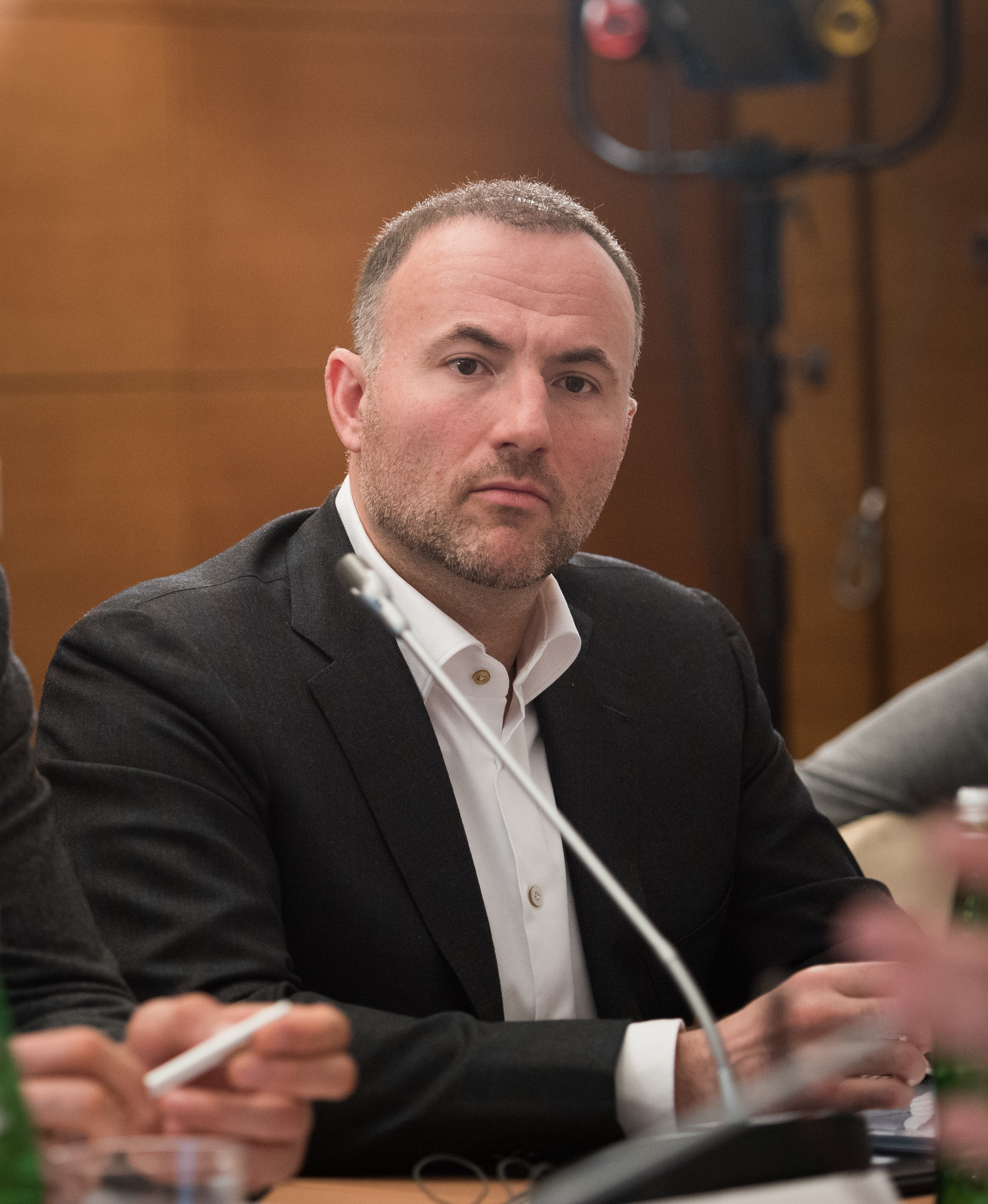
- Born: 27 October 1971 (age 54); Kharkiv, Ukrainian SSR, USSR
- Citizenship: Russian; Ukrainian
- Education: Kharkiv State University
- Occupation: Businessman
- Years active: 1992–present

Pavel Yakovlevich Fuks (Ukrainian: Павло Якович Фукс, Russian: Павел Яковлевич Фукс (surname sometimes also spelled Fuchs); born 27 October 1971) is a Russian-Ukrainian oligarch (Note: Multiple references: "Ukraine, United States Pro-Russia oligarch still escaping US sanctions despite crackdown". 20 March 2024. Archived from the original on 19 January 2025.; Dean, Grace. "An oligarch bankrolled a scheme to paint swastikas in Ukraine to fuel Putin's unfounded claims about rampant Nazism, a report says". Business Insider. Archived from the original on 2022-11-28.; "Oligarch, friend of Trump: Who is Pavel Fuchs?". Al Jazeera.; Siegal, Tobias. "Jewish businessman paid for Nazi graffiti in Ukraine before Russia invaded – report". Times of Israel. Archived from the original on 2024-04-17.) based in the United Kingdom. He began his career in Russia, where he acquired Russian citizenship and accumulated most of his wealth. He is known for founding Mos City Group, a now-defunct construction company that operated in Russia.

Fuks has been sanctioned by both Russia and Ukraine for his alleged crimes. FBI considers Fuks as a Russian intelligence asset. He holds Ukrainian and Russian citizenship, and has indefinite leave to remain in the UK, but claims that he surrendered his Russian passport in 2017.

== Early life and education ==
Pavel (Pavlo) Fuks was born in October 1971, in Kharkiv, Ukraine. In 1994, he graduated from the Kharkiv State University, earning a degree from the Department of Economic and Social Planning. Between 1997 and 2003, Fuks pursued further education at the Plekhanov Russian University of Economics, specializing in international economy.

== Career ==
=== Career in Russia ===
Fuks began his career after relocating to Russia following his graduation. From 1995 to 1999, he served as an adviser to the chairman of the board at JSCB Prominvestbank. Following this role, from 1999 to 2000, he held the position of Vice President at CJSC Foreign Economic Corporation.

In 2000, Fuks invested in an oil company named Nefthold LLC, which was later found to have connections with Russian politicians and government officials. By 2002, he had expanded his business interests into the construction industry. One of his initial projects was the construction of the "Kaluzhskii" shopping center, which has been operational since 2001.

In June 2008, Fuks entered negotiations with Donald Trump regarding the construction of the Trump Tower in Moscow. However, the discussions did not result in an agreement, and Bloomberg was unable to verify the claims of these negotiations.

By 2010, Fuks had become the largest shareholder of Sovcombank, owning a 21.83 percent stake. In March 2015, he sold his shares, which were valued at US$80 million. According to records from the Ministry of Internal Affairs, Fuks was assigned the Russian nickname "Naemnik," translating to "mercenary" in English.

In March 2018, the London International Arbitration Court ordered the now-defunct MosCityGroup (MCG) to pay $55 million to a division of BTA Bank. In 2009, MCG had acquired a stake in the Eurasia Tower (Moscow City) from Mukhtar Ablyazov, a fugitive and former Kazakh banker who was the former owner of BTA Bank. Kenes Rakishev, the new owner of BTA Bank, stated that MCG failed to pay the second tranche of $30 million as part of a deal to purchase a 50 percent stake in the Eurasia construction project. In addition, the BTA Bank incurred £4.2 million in legal fees. Rakishev further claimed that lawyers had filed personal claims against Pavel Fuks in relation to this matter.

In 2019, an international arrest warrant was issued for Pavel Fuks and his brother. They are wanted in both Russia and Kazakhstan for allegedly embezzling millions of dollars from the Moscow-City project.

In July 2023, an FBI whistleblower submitted a 22-page disclosure to the Senate Judiciary Committee. The disclosure reveals that the FBI assessed Fuks as a "co-opted asset" of Russian intelligence services, implicating Fuks as a tool used by Russian intelligence to further its objectives. While the disclosure does not specify a particular Russian intelligence agency, it indicates an association with the Federal Security Service (FSB), the successor to the KGB. The allegations include accusations of Fuks laundering money for Russian spies and orchestrating provocations in Ukraine to support Russian President Vladimir Putin's claim of “de-Nazification” as a pretext for the Russian invasion.

=== Career in Ukraine ===
After the Euromaidan protests and the onset of Russian aggression, Fuks developed a keen interest to invest in Ukraine in 2014.

In 2017, Fuks hired Rudy Giuliani's law firm to help improve Kharkiv's public image. According to Novoye Vremya, Fuks utilized Giuliani's expertise to establish an investment support office in the U.S. for Kharkiv. The New York Times reported that Fuks asserted Giuliani was hired as a lobbyist. However, Giuliani denied any knowledge of these claims and refuted involvement in lobbying activities for Fuks in the U.S.

In January 2018, Al Jazeera published a 99-page report partly based on information from the nominal director of a Cypriot offshore company linked to Pavel Fuks. The report revealed that Fuks was negotiating the acquisition of Quickpace Limited, a Cypriot company holding $160 million in assets managed by Viktor Yanukovych, the fourth President of Ukraine, and sanctioned oligarch Serhiy Kurchenko. Consequently, in September 2015, Fuks, alongside Oleksandr Onyshchenko, acquired Quickpace Limited's frozen assets for $30 million (with Fuks holding a 33 percent stake) and a private jet.

On July 19, 2022, Fuks won a lawsuit against American lobbyist Yuri Vanetik in the U.S., obliging him to return Fuks $200 thousand and interest due to dispute over Trump 2017 inauguration events Fuks wanted to attend. Vanetik said he planned to appeal the ruling.

Fuks has been accused of operating false flag influence campaigns in Ukraine to benefit Russian aggression and seeking access to president Trump to allegedly ingratiate himself to Russian intelligence service, FSB. The scandals tied to Fuks role as a Russian mole range from allegations of sponsoring swastika vandalism campaigns on Ukrainian synagogue walls to hiring Rudy Giuliani to conduct lobbying campaigns, to attempting to attend presidential inaugural events.

==== Golden Derrick ====
In 2015–2017, the Cypriot offshore company Hartlog Limited, whose beneficiary, according to the Russian Anti-Corruption Center, is Pavel Fuks, bought 67% of Golden Derrick shares from Eduard Stavytsky. Subsequently, this company was renamed East Up Petroleum LLC. The National Joint Stock Company Nadra Ukrayiny owned a 33% stake in the authorized capital. In 2017, the State Service of Geology and Subsoil of Ukraine (the owner of Nadra Ukrayiny) transferred 16 licenses for gas fields to East Up Petroleum. In an official statement, Nadra Ukrayiny emphasized that during the entire time of participation in Golden Derrick's share, and then in East Up Petroleum, the company did not receive any dividends and did not influence the activities."

Public outcry was caused by the information about the complete transfer by Nadra Ukrayiny of its remaining share (33% of the company) to Avant Trade Limited, which is also strongly associated with Pavel Fuks. In its statement, Nadra Ukrayiny stated that the sale price was UAH 12 million. Fuks himself denied that he had bought Golden Derrick.

According to journalistic investigations, East Up Petroleum is controlled by Pavel Fuks, but indirectly, through a chain of shell companies. Thus, at the end of 2017, Golden Derrick founded a dozen and a half companies in Kyiv, which indicate exploratory drilling and production of hydrocarbons as their main activity. Subsequently, East Up Petroleum planned to transfer one or two gas production licenses to each of these companies with the further goal of a full sale of assets.

According to a journalist's request, in November 2018, the Prosecutor General's Office of Ukraine transferred to the National Police a criminal proceeding on the fact of illegal issuance of special permits for the use of subsoil of Ukraine by the State Service of Geology and Mineral Resources. In April 2018, the court authorized the PGO to seize documents from East Up Petroleum. In addition, Arkona Gas Energy is involved in the proceedings.

On June 18, 2021, the National Security and Defense Council imposed sanctions on Fuks for his involvement in Golden Derrick.

==== Partnership with Kolomoisky and Khomutynnik ====
Together with Ihor Kolomoyskyi and Vitaliy Khomutynnik, Pavel Fuks is a co-owner (18%) of Ukrnaftoburinnya, one of Ukraine's largest gas producers worth $500 million.

On 7 April 2023, the Pecherskyi District Court of Kyiv seized the corporate rights of Ukrnaftoburinnya, a gas production company. On 11 April, the same court ruled that the company's assets were transferred to the Asset Recovery and Management Agency. The company appealed this decision in court.

==== Prominvestbank ====
Fuks was called one of the most likely buyers of Prominvestbank, controlled by Russia's Vnesheconombank. The Antimonopoly Committee of Ukraine received a request from Fuchs to acquire more than 25% of the bank. However, the businessman failed to obtain approval from the NBU.

== Sanctions ==
=== Russia ===
In 2018, Fuchs condemned the annexation of Crimea and Russian aggression in Donbas as criminal acts. Consequently, on November 1, 2018, Russia imposed sanctions against 322 Ukrainian citizens, including Pavlo Fuchs.

=== Ukraine ===
According to Intelligence Online and Business Insider, Ukraine had requested that Fuks be sanctioned by US and his visa was revoked at the border and he was subjected to expedited removal from U.S. in 2018.

In 2019, Fuks was charged in absentia for embezzlement of funds.

In June 2021, the National Security and Defense Council (NSDC) of Ukraine issued a decision on June 18, 2021, titled "On the Application of Personal Special Economic and Other Restrictive Measures (Sanctions)." This decision imposed sanctions against businessmen Pavel Fuchs and Dmitry Firtash, as well as against Russian high-ranking officials and oligarchs. Oleksiy Danilov, Secretary of the NSDC, stated that the sanctions against Fuchs were related to Golden Derrick, a gas production company that allegedly obtained relevant licenses illegally. The corresponding Decree of the President of Ukraine implementing this decision was signed and published on June 24, 2021. These sanctions are set to remain in effect for three years.

Pavel Fuchs denied any association with Golden Derrick and described the sanctions as a "personal revenge" by Oleksiy Danilov. He highlighted his longstanding partnership with Mykhailo Brodsky, beginning with their mutual involvement in the Yabloko Party. Additionally, Danilov's wife is a business partner of Brodsky's son, and together they co-own several companies. Fuchs vowed to challenge the NSDC sanctions in court. In 2021, the publication "Obozrevatel" lost a court case against Fuchs concerning the protection of his business reputation related to the bankruptcy of "Zolota Medisna" LLC.

In May 2023, the SBU (Security Service of Ukraine) issued an indictment of Fuks accusing him of large-scale financial manipulations with strategic enterprises in Ukraine and systematic tax evasion. According to the SBU, Fuks using proxy managers and shell companies illegally took over assets of Ukrainian companies worth over UAH 100 billion. in 2018.

On June 24, 2024, the President of Ukraine issued a new decree that enacted a decision by the National Security Council, extending the sanctions against Pavel Fuchs for an additional ten years.

== Personal life ==
Fuks has repeatedly been included in the rating of billionaires of the magazine, Finance. In 2011, he took 150th place in the ranking of Russian billionaires, and a capital estimate of $740 million. According to Focus, Fuks had a fortune of $270 million and took the 24th position in the 2017 ranking of the 100 richest people in Ukraine.

In 2012, Fuks obtained a Tier 1 Investor visa, a UK program that granted residency to foreign nationals investing at least £1 million; the scheme initially had limited oversight. In 2017, he was granted indefinite leave to remain in the United Kingdom.

In 2014, Fuks was made the Honorary Citizen of Kharkov Gennady Kernes. As a result, a controversy was created and the following day the honor was revoked.

Fuks had Russian citizenship, but in June 2021, he indicated that he had renounced it. Fuks claims that in 2017, he had handed over his Russian passport at the consular department of the Russian Embassy in Ukraine.

== Philanthropy ==
Fuks has regularly aided Kharkiv, having taken part in the restoration of the Kharkiv Philharmonic Society and construction of the Church of the Holy Queen Tamara and a monument to the mythical founder of Kharkiv, cossack Kharko.

He has supported athletes, including giving Ukrainian freestyle skier Oleksandr Abramenko and his mentor and senior coach of the Ukrainian national team, Enver Ablaev, certificates for 50 thousand dollars each for their achievements in Pyeongchang at the XXIII Olympic Winter Games.

=== Babi Yar Holocaust Memorial Center ===
Fuks was the co-organizer of the construction of the Babyn Yar Holocaust Memorial Center, which was projected to cost an estimated US$50 to 100 million. According to Fuks, the structure of the memorial will include educational programs, a research center and a museum.

On 19 March 2017, the supervisory board of the Memorial Center for the Holocaust "Babi Yar" was established, and included Pavel Fuks, the Mayor of Kyiv Vitali Klitschko and his brother, the professional boxer Wladimir Klitschko. The board also included the shareholders of the consortium "Alfa Group" Mikhail Fridman and German Khan, among others.

Critics of the project, such as Ukrainian Jewish dissident, leader and president of Association of Jewish Communities of Ukraine, Yosyf Zisels, characterized the project as a Russian Trojan Horse. In 2021, after the levying of sanctions by the National Security Council of Ukraine against Pavel Fuks for his role in illegally obtaining licenses for the extraction of minerals from Ukraine, the Babi Yar Supervisory Council announced that he had temporarily left the supervisory board with plans to return if the sanctions get lifted.

== Awards ==
On August 6, 2014, the Kharkiv City Council awarded the title of “Honorary Citizen of Kharkiv” to two Russian citizens - Pavel Fuks and businessman and senator Alexander Shishkin, who supported Russia's annexation of Crimea and military invasion of Ukraine. Both were nominated by the then pro-Russian mayor of Kharkiv, Hennadiy Kernes, at the suggestion of the Moscow Patriarchate Church as patrons of the construction of its churches in Kharkiv.

The decision of the city council was made despite protests from the public, which picketed its meetings, due to the fact that most of the deputies belonged to the faction of the pro-Russian Party of Regions, which was later banned in Ukraine. After the failed vote to exclude the Russians from the list of honorary citizens, the opposition in the Kharkiv City Council appealed the awarding of the title to Fuks and Shishkin to the prosecutor's office.

Following a protest by the Kharkiv prosecutor, the decision of the Kharkiv City Council was first suspended and then canceled in court. However, in December 2014, the city council won the appeal. The legal proceedings lasted for several years, and after Fuks became a Ukrainian citizen, they began to concern only Shishkin.

In August 2023, Kharkiv Mayor Ihor Terekhov, in response to public criticism, agreed that the list of honorary citizens of the city should be revised. However, "in times of war", he said, a discussion about this was "impossible and unnecessary". At the same time, the Kharkiv City Council refused to publish information on the awarding of scholarships to "honorary citizens". After that, Pavlo Fuks released a statement saying that he had never received funds from the city budget in the status of an "Honorary Citizen of Kharkiv". However, this information can be neither proved nor disproved.

He also has a number of awards from different Ukrainian military and intelligence services (SBU, GUR, UAF, and National Guardian brigades, etc.) for regular donations.
