= Vitaliy Khomutynnik =

Ukrainian politician (born 1976)

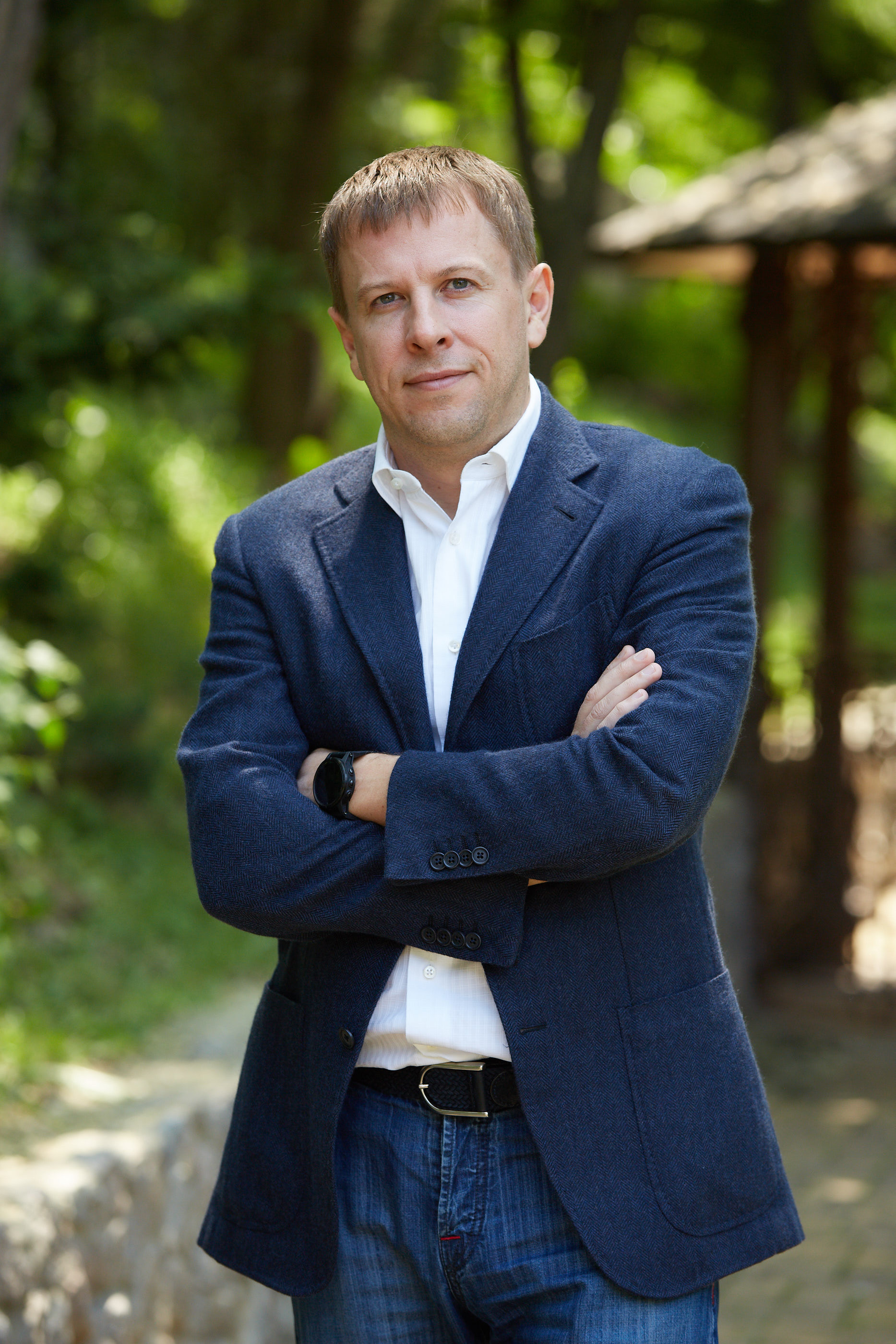
- Born: August 4, 1976 (age 49); Makiivka, Ukrainian SSR, Soviet Union (now Ukraine)
- Citizenship: Ukraine
- Occupation: Businessman
- Years active: 2002–present
- Children: 2

Vitaliy Yuriyovych Khomutynnik (Ukrainian: Віта́лій Ю́рійович Хомути́ннік, born 4 August 1976, Makiivka, Donetsk Oblast, Ukrainian SSR) is a Ukrainian entrepreneur, investor, oligarch, and former politician. He is the founder and chairman of Cascade Investment Fund and president of the Ukrainian Golf Federation.

From 2002 to 2019, he was a member of several convocations of the Verkhovna Rada of Ukraine (IV – VIII), including representation of the electoral bloc of political parties For United Ukraine!, Party of Regions, and the Revival party.

Khomutynnik is on the list of persons against whom the Russian government imposed sanctions in 2018.

== Biography ==
Born on August 4, 1976, in Makiivka, Donetsk region.

He graduated from the Donetsk State Academy of Management in 2000 with a degree in finance and credit. He received his second higher education at the Yaroslav Mudryi National Law Academy of Ukraine (2007).

== Business career ==
Khomutynnik began his career in 1991, when he joined the State Enterprise Specialized Department of Reclamation and Mechanization of Construction. From 2001 to 2003, he was the CEO of CJSC Spetsodjag. From January 2002 to August 2019, he was the owner, and since September 2019, the chairman of Cascade Investment Fund. He is also an owner of the insurance company Brokbusiness.

In 2014, he was considered as the wealthiest and youngest MP and was a close associate of Viktor Yanukovych. According to his 2014 declaration, he earned UAH 293.8 million. In 2015, he declared UAH 167 million in income and UAH 354 million in bank accounts. In the rating of the magazine The New Voice of Ukraine 100 richest Ukrainians, published in October 2019, his assets were estimated at $478 million (an increase of 23% compared to 2018); that was the 13th place in the rating.

Khomutynnik was a business partner along with Pavel Fuks in a Ukrainian gas company called Ukrnaftoburinnya, usually associated with Ihor Kolomoyskyi. Until 2019, the main focus of Khomutynnik's Ukrainian business was energy and the agricultural sector. However, from 2020 to 2023, Cascade Investment Fund exited the companies Kernel, JKX Oil&Gas and Ukrnaftoburinnia, now Cascade is focusing on real estate, funds and venture companies in Europe. In April 2023, the Pecheresky District Court in Kyiv transferred the assets of the Ukrnaftoburinnya company to state management, the company appealed this decision in court.

In 2019, Khomutynnik acquired a stake in Dmitry Firtash's Dresdenco Investments, after an approval by Antimonopoly Committee of Ukraine.

=== Oil and gas business ===
Vitaliy Khomutynnik used to own shares in MC Ukrnaftoburinnya PJSC, the second largest private gas production company in Ukraine in terms of production volume, he sold his stocks of Ukrnaftoburinnya.

He sold 19.97 percent stake in JKX Oil & Gas in 2020.

=== Agricultural business ===
In October 2015, Khomutynnik acquired a 5% stake in Ukraine's largest oil processor, Kernel Holding (as of 2021, the company has a landbank of 514,000 hectares). In November 2017, Cascade Investment Fund, owned by Khomutynnik, increased its stake in Kernel Holding S. A. from 5% to 6.59%. In 2023 Kernel Holding announced the delisting of the company from Warsaw Stock Exchange

In 2018, the Antimonopoly Committee of Ukraine allowed Ukroagro Alliance Ltd and Kma Group Ltd to acquire a stake in the authorized capital of Dnipro Agro Alliance Ltd, which is located in the Dnipro region and covers more than 50 thousand hectares.

Since 2021 one third of the shares in Kernel Agro Holding owned by Cascade Investment Fund have been sold in publicly announced shares buy-back. The rest were sold during delisting.

=== Venture capital business ===
Since 2019, Khomutynnik has been focusing on venture capital investments. Cascade Investment Fund, headed by Khomutynnik, makes investments of up to $10-15 million each. The company operates on the principle of investment diversification. Cascade Investment Fund invested in various sectors of the Ukrainian economy, later invested in public companies, and in 2019 created a venture capital division, which accounted for 10% of the portfolio (as of 2021).

In 2020, Playco, a mobile game start-up (which is dedicated to creating games that can be played without downloading and launched via a link on any platform), raised $100 million in a funding round and became a unicorn. Playco's value is estimated at $1 billion.

== Political career ==
Khomutynnik's political career began at the local council. From May 1998 to April 2002 he was a deputy, and from September 1998 he was the chairman of the planning and budget commission of the Central City District Council of Makiivka. From October 1999, he headed the Council of Young Entrepreneurs of Donetsk Oblast, and later the Council of Young Entrepreneurs of Ukraine, which was part of the Ukrainian League of Industrialists and Entrepreneurs (Anatoliy Kinakh was the president of the ULIE). Khomutynnik was a board member of the Association of Young Deputies (since September 1999). Since April 2000, he has been the Minister of Fuel and Energy of the Youth Government of Ukraine, and since May 2000, a member of the ULIE Board. From February 2003 to February 2005, he was an advisor to the Prime Minister of Ukraine.

In 2017, Khomutynnik and his accompanied Russian-Ukrainian oligarch Pavel Fuks, known as his business partner, in the United States, in an attempt to attend First inauguration of Donald Trump.

=== Verkhovna Rada of Ukraine ===
Vitaliy Khomutynnik became the youngest member of the Verkhovna Rada of Ukraine IV convocation. His term of office lasted from April 2002 to April 2006 (constituency No. 53, Donetsk region, nominated by the Electoral Bloc of Political Parties For United Ukraine!). His career record also includes member of the Committee on Legal Policy (June – July 2002), member of the Committee on Industrial Policy and Entrepreneurship (July – December 2002), member of the Committee on Finance and Banking (since December 2002). Member of the State Commission on the Strategy of Economic and Social Development (since March 2003).

He was a member of the Verkhovna Rada of Ukraine until 2019 – he was a deputy of the IV to VIII convocations from 2002 to 2019.

As a People's Deputy of the Vth convocation (April 2006 – November 2007), he was No. 15 on the Party of Regions list. He was a member of the Committee on Finance and Banking (since July 2006), a member of the Party of Regions faction (since May 2006).

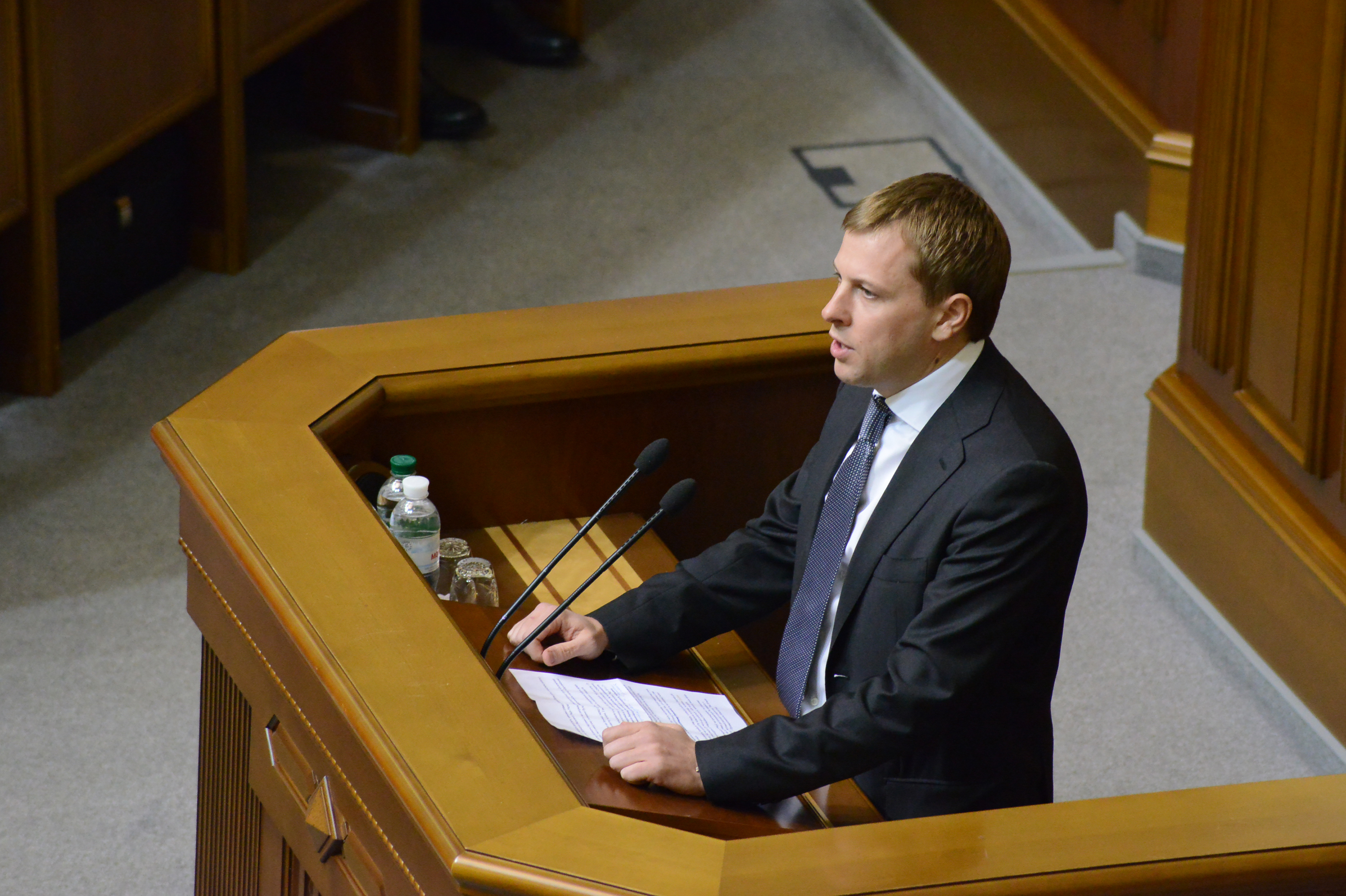
On the rostrum of the Verkhovna Rada of Ukraine (2014)

He became a member of the VI convocation of Verkhovna Rada of Ukraine (No. 91 on the Party of Regions list, since November 2007). Among the votes of his cadence was the second reading for the Law of Ukraine "On the Principles of State Language Policy" on August 10, 2012.

As a member of the VII convocation of Verkhovna Rada of Ukraine (since December 2012) he was a head of Committee on Taxation and Customs Policy and head of Committee on Financial Policy and Banking and controlled taxation and VAT refunds.

Vitaliy Khomutynnik left the Party of Regions on February 21, 2014. In October 2014, he was elected as a member of the Verkhovna Rada of the VIII convocation in the constituency No. 171, Kharkiv. During his time as a member of parliament, Khomutynnik created a pressure group with around ten MPs, termed as "Khomutynnik group" in Wilson Center report, that was created to support Ihor Kolomoyskyi in the parliament. He was one of the MPs who voted for dictatorial laws on January 16, 2014. In the 2019 Ukrainian parliamentary election Khomutynnik lost his parliamentary seat. Together with 19 members of the Verkhovna Rada, he joined and headed the parliamentary group Economic Development. During his time as a member of parliament, Khomutynnik created and was a co-chair of the Revival parliamentary group.

During his tenure, Khomutynnik, as other members of Ukrainian parliament, has been accused of evading taxes. In a couple of months The General Prosecutor's Office of Ukraine closed the criminal proceedings on checking the declarations of Vitaliy Khomutynnik, no crime was established. He was mentioned by some journalist and academics as oligarch.

== Criticism ==
Khomutynnik acquired a luxury yacht, Apostrophe, from Moran Yacht & Ship company in 2014 for $24 million. The yacht is registered in the Cayman Islands.

During the parliamentary elections of 2014, observers of the Opora network recorded 2 bribes of voters with food packages from Khomutynnik, who ran for the 171 district of Kharkiv. In October 2014, the Kharkiv Appeals Administrative Court ruled that there were no violations on the part of Khomutynnik.

In 2017, Serhiy Leshchenko writing for Die Zeit described him as a corrupt politician.

== Personal life ==
Khomutynnik is married. His wife Svitlana Viktorivna Khomutynnik (née Sopelnyk) (born 1980) is an economist. The couple has two children: son Artemii (born in 2007) and daughter Maria.

== Awards and recognition ==
- 2010: Honored Economist of Ukraine
