= Anton Polyakov =

Ukrainian politician (1987–2021)

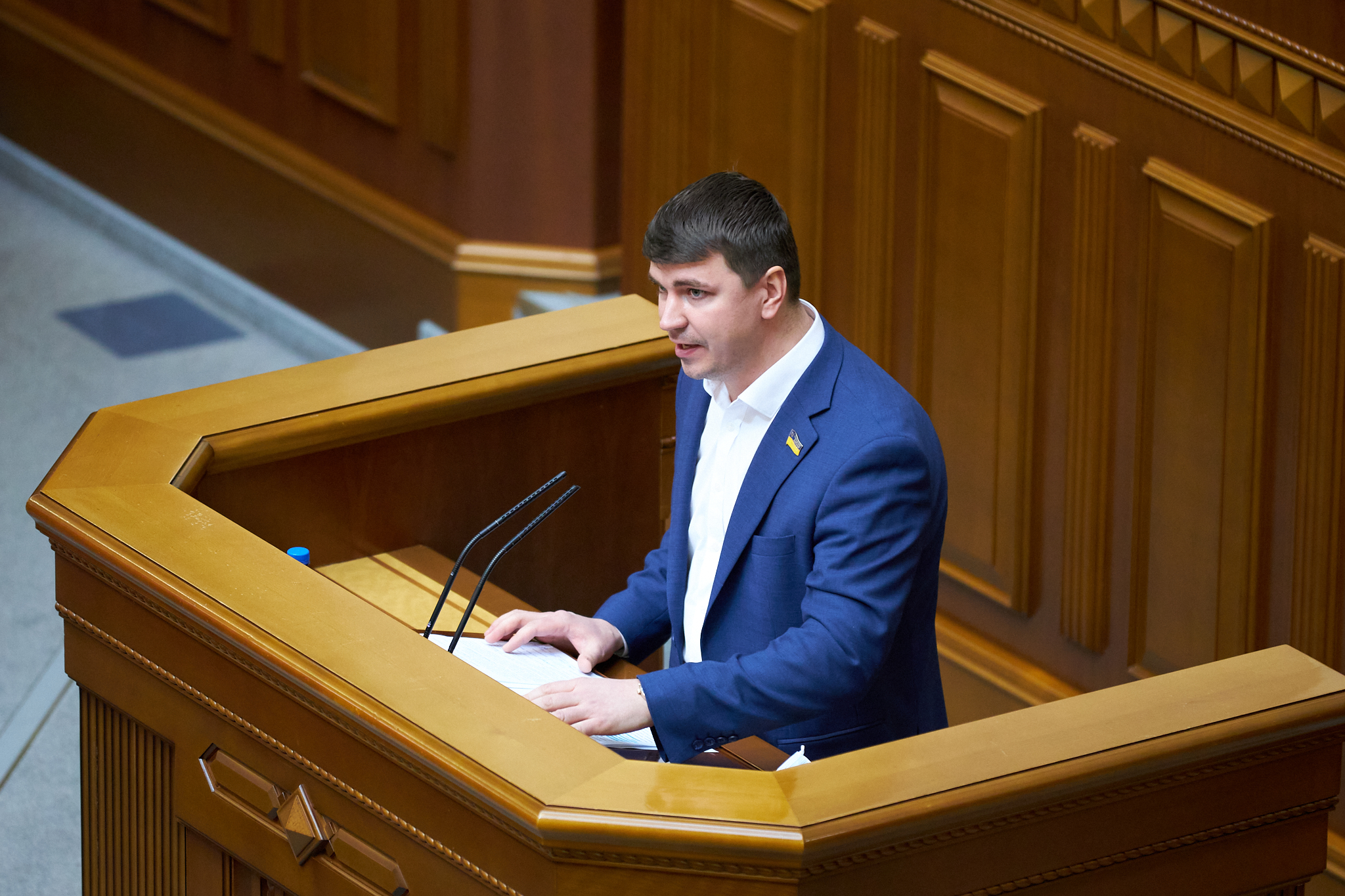
- Polyakov in 2021

Member of the Verkhovna Rada
- In office 29 August 2019 – 8 October 2021

Personal details
- Born: 11 November 1987 Chernihiv, Ukrainian SSR, Soviet Union
- Died: 8 October 2021 (aged 33) Kyiv, Ukraine
- Party: Servant of the People (until 2019); For the Future (2020-2021)

Anton Polyakov (Ukrainian: Антон Едуардович Поляков; 11 November 1987 – 8 October 2021) was a Ukrainian politician. A member of the party Servant of the People (until December 2019), he served in the Verkhovna Rada from 2019 to 2021.

== Early life ==
Polyakov was born on 11 November 1987 in Chernihiv, which was then part of the Ukrainian SSR in the Soviet Union. In 2004, he graduated from Chernihiv Collegium No. 11. Later, in 2010, he registered the trademark "Count" for a company selling flooring.

== Political career ==
In 2016, he became head of the public organization "Ukrainian Center for Combating Crime and Corruption", and during the 2019 Ukrainian presidential election was a confidant of Volodymyr Zelenskyy for electoral district no. 205. Later that same year, he was elected to the Verkhovna Rada during the 2019 Ukrainian parliamentary election as a non-partisan nominated by the Servant of the People for the 206th constituency (Chernihiv). Upon joining the parliament, he became a member of the Servant of the People party until 25 November 2019 when he was expelled together alongside Anna Skorokhod. According to an official party statement, he was removed for not voting in line with the party's position. He formally submitted a letter of resignation from the party on 16 December 2019.

He was non-fractional in parliament until 2020 when he became a member of the For the Future party. He was notable from then for submitting a record number of amendments against the "anti-Kolomoisky law", and in September 2020 the For the Future party nominated him for the post of Mayor of Chernihiv.

== Death ==
He died from coronary heart disease on 8 October 2021, at the age of 33. Alcohol and methadone were found in Anton's blood. Verkhovna Rada deputy Anna Skorokhod said that Anton Polyakov was murdered.

== See also ==
- List of members of the Verkhovna Rada of Ukraine who died in office
