= Valeriy Cherkaska =

Ukrainian politician

- Валерій Черкаска

Deputy Head of the Zaporizhzhia Oblast State Administration
- In office 21 May 2008 – 23 July 2009

Governor of Zaporizhzhia Oblast (acting)
- In office 24 December 2007 – 31 May 2008
- Preceded by: Yevhen Chervonenko
- Succeeded by: Oleksandr Starukh

Deputy Head of the Zaporizhzhia Oblast State Administration
- In office December 2006 – 24 December 2007

Member of the Zaporizhzhia City Council
- In office 2002 – December 2006

Personal details
- Born: Valeriy Voldymyrovych Cherkaska; 3 July 1975 (age 50) Kharkiv, Soviet Union
- Party: Independent

Valeriy Voldymyrovych Cherkaska (Ukrainian: Валерій Володимирович Черкаска; born on 3 July 1975), is a Ukrainian politician who served as the acting governor of Zaporizhzhia Oblast from 2007 to 2008.

== Biography ==
Valeriy Cherkaska was born in Kharkiv on 3 July 1975.

From September 1982 to September 1988, he was a student of Kharkiv secondary school No. 109.

In September 1988 he was a student of Kharkiv Regional School of Olympic Reserve No. 1, Kharkiv. After graduating in June 1992 from the Kharkiv Regional School of the Olympic Reserve No. 1, he entered the Kharkiv State University of Economics at the "Information Systems in Management" faculty, which he graduated in 1997, having received the specialty "engineer-economist".

From May to July 1996, he was the Acting Deputy General Director for Economics of Energodar-Agro Joint Stock Company, in Energodar, Zaporizhzhia Oblast. From July 1996 to January 2000, he was promoted as the Acting General Director of Energodar-Agro Joint Stock Company.

From January to December 2000, he was the Acting General Director of the Limited Liability Company (LLC) "VMK-Renaissance", in Energodar.

Between December 2000 and February 2002, he is the General Director of LLC "Trading and Investment House" Zaporizhia-Moscow", based in Zaporizhia.

In 2001, he obtained a second higher education, graduating by correspondence from the Berdiansk Institute of Entrepreneurship, majoring in Organizational Management. He is a legal support of entrepreneurial activity", manager-lawyer.

From February 2002 to June 2002, he was the director of Ukrphosphat LLC, city Chernihivka, Zaporizhzhia region.

From July 2002 to May 2003, he was the Head of the Main Department of Agriculture and Food of Zaporizhzhya Regional State Administration.

In 2002, Cherkaska was elected a member of the Zaporizhzhya City Council.

On 24 March 2003, he became the Head of the Vasylivska District State Administration of the Zaporizhia Oblast.

On 14 January 2004, he formally became the deputy mayor of Zaporizhia for the activities of executive bodies of the Zaporizhia City Council.

In December 2006, he became the deputy head of the Zaporizhzhia Oblast state administration.

On 16 January 2007, Cherkaska became the acting Governor of Zaporizhzhia Oblast.

On 31 May 2008, after the appointment of Oleksandr Starukh as acting governor, Cherkaska again became the deputy head of the Oblast State Administration. On 23 July 2009, Cherkaska wrote a statement about his resignation as deputy head of the Oblast State Administration.

On 10 October, he was appointed the head of the Zaporozhye city staff for Prime Minister Yulia Tymoshenko, who was running for president.

In November 2010, he is a graduate student of the National Academy of Public Administration under the President of Ukraine.

He is a member of the Zaporizhzhia Regional Union of Industrialists and Entrepreneurs "Potential".

== Sports activities ==
He is a candidate for master of sports in swimming, and a certified swimming instructor and judge. He is also the President of the Zaporizhia Swimming Federation.

== Family ==
He is married to Olena Pikiner, daughter of the head of the Berdyansk seaport, ex-deputy governor of the Zaporizhia region Volodymyr Pikiner. The couple raised two sons, and Artur (born 2003) and Mark (born 2008).
