= Oleh Koliev =

Ukrainian politician

- Олег Колєв
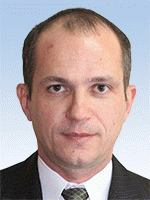
- Official portrait, 2019

People's Deputy of Ukraine
- Incumbent
- Assumed office 29 August 2019
- Preceded by: Hennadiy Chekita
- Constituency: Odesa Oblast, No. 134

Personal details
- Born: 9 May 1973 (age 53) Sukholuzhzhia, Ukrainian SSR, Soviet Union (now Ukraine)
- Party: Servant of the People
- Other political affiliations: Independent
- Education: Izmail State University of Humanities

Oleh Viktorovych Koliev (Ukrainian: Олег Вікторович Колєв; born 9 May 1973) is a Ukrainian politician currently serving as a People's Deputy of Ukraine representing Ukraine's 134th electoral district from Servant of the People since 2019.

== Early life and career ==
Oleh Viktorovych Koliev was born on 9 May 1973 in the village of Sukholuzhzhia, in Ukraine's southern Odesa Oblast. He is a graduate of the faculty of history at the Izmail State University of Humanities. Prior to his election, Koliev worked as a history teacher, as well as a journalist for local media outlets. He was director of the Trans-Danubian News Editorial Gazette.

== Political career ==
In the 2019 Ukrainian parliamentary election, Koliev was the candidate of Servant of the People for People's Deputy of Ukraine in Ukraine's 134th electoral district. At the time of the election, he was an independent. He was successfully elected, defeating independents Yevhen Chervonenko (former governor of Zaporizhzhia Oblast and Minister of Infrastructure) and Hennadiy Chekita (incumbent People's Deputy), as well as actor and director Maksym Firsenko of the Party of Shariy with 35.11% of the vote. Chervonenko garnered 16.85% of the vote, Chekita 8.52%, and Firsenko 7.32%.

In the Verkhovna Rada, Koliev joined the Servant of the People faction, as well as the Verkhovna Rada Law Enforcement Committee. He also joined the For Odeshchyna inter-factional association.
