= Anna Skorokhod =

Ukrainian politician

- Анна Скороход
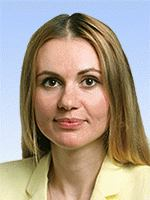
- Official portrait, 2019

People's Deputy of Ukraine
- Incumbent
- Assumed office 29 August 2019
- Preceded by: Oleksandr Onyshchenko
- Constituency: Kyiv Oblast, No. 93

Personal details
- Born: 14 January 1990 (age 36) Vyshhorod, Ukrainian SSR, Soviet Union (now Ukraine)
- Party: For the Future
- Other political affiliations: Servant of the People (2019); Independent
- Education: Kyiv National University of Culture and Arts; National Academy of Internal Affairs

Anna Kostiantynivna Skorokhod (Ukrainian: Анна Костянтинівна Скороход; born 14 January 1990) is a Ukrainian politician currently serving as a People's Deputy of Ukraine representing Ukraine's 93rd electoral district since 2019. Elected as a member of Servant of the People, she was expelled from the party in November 2019 after claiming the government arrested her husband for her refusal to support the liberalisation of the land market. She is currently a member of For the Future.

== Early life and career ==
Anna Kostiantynivna Skorokhod was born on 14 January 1990 in the city of Vyshhorod, in what was then the Soviet Union. She is a graduate of the Kyiv National University of Culture and Arts (specialising in television journalism) and the National Academy of Internal Affairs (specialising in jurisprudence).

Prior to her election, Skorokhod worked as a lawyer for the Kyiv City Council and private companies. She was additionally deputy director for legal and organisational matters at the Progress Construction Plant. Her husband, Alexei Alyakin, is a citizen of Russia and a veteran of the Aidar Battalion. He has been arrested twice; the first time in 2018 for fraud, and the second time a year later for lying on his citizenship application.

== Political career ==
Skorokhod ran to become a People's Deputy of Ukraine from Ukraine's 93rd electoral district in the 2019 Ukrainian parliamentary election. She was the candidate of Servant of the People, though she was an independent politician at the time of the election. She won the election, defeating independent Oleksandr Zhukotanskyi and 16 other candidates with 43.89% of the vote.

In the Verkhovna Rada (Ukrainian national parliament), Skorokhod joined the Servant of the People faction and Verkhovna Rada Committee on Energy and Housing and Communal Services.

Skorokhod became embroiled in controversy soon after becoming a People's Deputy, voting against bills to liberalise the land market and break up the Naftogaz monopoly on the gas industry. Servant of the People faction leader Davyd Arakhamia has also alleged that she additionally attempted to bribe other People's Deputies.

Skorokhod claimed in a speech to the Verkhovna Rada on 10 November 2019 that she was being targeted by the government and law enforcement, claiming her husband had been arrested in retaliation for her votes, and called on President Volodymyr Zelenskyy to ensure that law enforcement agencies would not harass her family. Other deputies responded by shouting "Shame!", though opposition politicians Iryna Herashchenko, Yulia Tymoshenko, and Nestor Shufrych each expressed support for Skorokhod, comparing Zelenskyy's government to the Great Purge. On 15 November 2019, she was expelled from the Servant of the People faction.

In July 2020, Skorokhod joined the For the Future faction in the Verkhovna Rada. Prior to the death of People's Deputy Anton Polyakov (also an expelled Servant of the People deputy), Skorokhod was engaged to him, and, following his death, claimed that he had been murdered due to her political activities.
