= For the Future (political party) =

Political party in Ukraine

For the Future За майбутнє
- Chairperson: Ihor Palytsia
- Parliamentary leaders: Viktor Bondar; Batenko Taras Ivanovich
- Founded: 16 December 2007 (Ukraine of the Future party); 29 August 2019 (For the Future parliamentary group); 20 May 2020 (For the Future party)
- Registered: 18 July 2008
- Merger of: UKROP; Revival; Agrarian Party; Andriy Baloha's Team; For Specific Cases
- Headquarters: Irynynsʹka 5/24, Kyiv, Ukraine. 01001
- Ideology: Liberalism; Economic nationalism; Populism
- Political position: Centre-right
- European affiliation: European Conservatives, Patriots & Affiliates
- Colours: Purple and green
- Verkhovna Rada: 17 / 450
- Regions: 4,073 / 43,122

Website
- zamajbutne.com.ua

For the Future (Ukrainian: За майбутнє, romanized: Za maibutnie [za mɐjˈbutʲnʲe]; ZM) is a political party in Ukraine directly supported by the oligarch Ihor Kolomoyskyi. The party was originally registered in July 2008 as Ukraine of the Future (Ukrainian: Україна Майбутнього, romanized: Ukraina Maibutnioho). During the 2010 local elections, the party only took part in Dnipropetrovsk Oblast, but it participates nationwide since the 2012 Ukrainian parliamentary election.

In October 2019, the party was renamed "For the Future". The party was renamed and taken over by the parliamentary group "For the Future", with 23 initial members, that was established in the Verkhovna Rada (Ukraine's parliament) on 29 August 2019 following the July 2019 Ukrainian parliamentary election.

== History ==
=== Ukraine of the Future ===
Logo of "Ukraine of the Future"

The party was created in December 2007. In 2012, Ukraine of the Future became member of the Liberal International, although at some point in the mid- to late-2010s it was delisted.

During the 2010 Ukrainian local elections, the party won four representatives in the Dnipropetrovsk Oblast Council (regional parliament) and 4 seats in the city council of Dnipropetrovsk. In the simultaneously held elected for Dnipro Mayor the parties candidate, Sviatoslav Oliynyk, finished second with 16.1%. (He lost this election to Ivan Kulichenko of Party of Regions who scored 40,1%.) Oliynyk is a former BYuT lawmaker.

In the 2012 parliamentary, elections the party did not spend anything on campaigning and but still managed to take the 15th place among the 21 parties who participated on the nationwide list with 0.18% of the votes. But since their win was far below the 5% election threshold and they won no constituencies (party had competed in 17 constituencies) they thus failed to win parliamentary representation. Oliynyk headed the party list of the party during these elections. The party did participate in the 2014 Ukrainian parliamentary election, and again did not win seats. The party did not participate in the 2015 Ukrainian local elections.

The party did not participate in the July 2019 Ukrainian parliamentary election.

=== For the Future ===
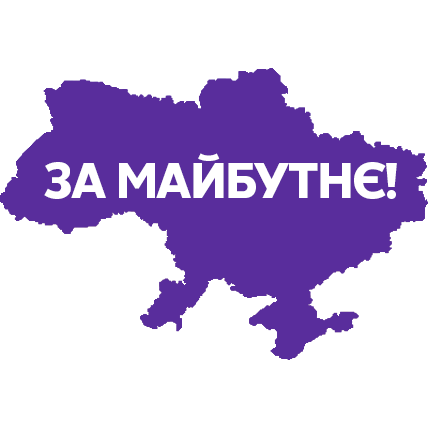
The party's first logo following its name change

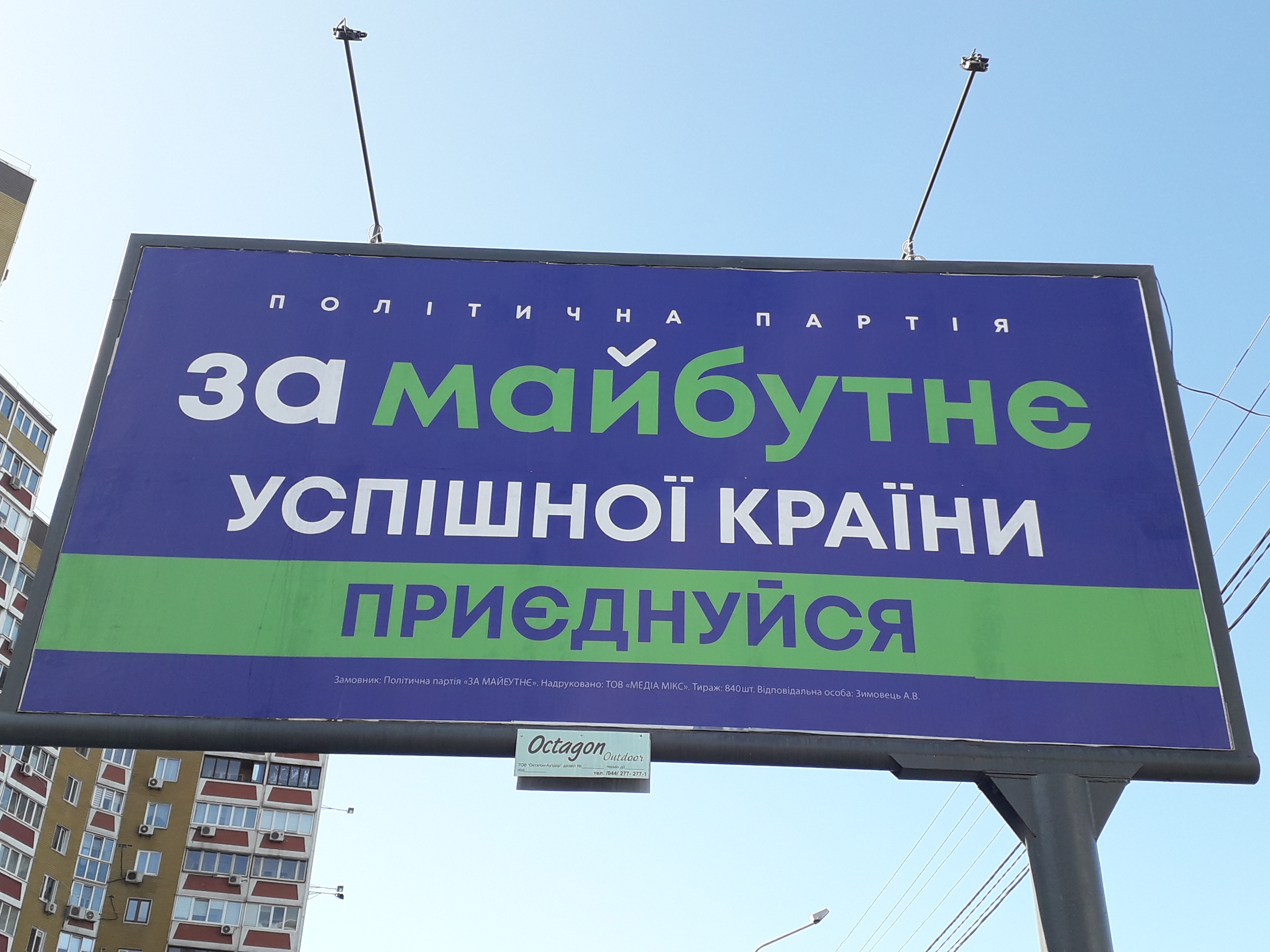
For the Future billboard during the 2020 local elections. The text reads "for the future of a successful nation, join us".

Following the 2019 Ukrainian parliamentary election, a parliamentary group "For the Future", with initial 23 members, was established in the Verkhovna Rada (Ukraine's parliament) on 29 August 2019. In May 2020 deputies from this group announced the creation of a party of the same name. This "new party" is legally a continuation of "Ukraine of the Future" that was renamed in October 2019 "For the Future". In May 2020, lawmaker Ihor Palytsia was elected chairman of the party. According to Palytsia the party is de facto a continuation of UKROP following its transformation. The party announced in the summer of 2020 it intended to take part in the October 2020 Ukrainian local elections. On 30 July 2020 Cherkasy mayor Anatoliy Bondarenko joined the party.

According to an analysis by Ukrainian NGO Detektor Media, by September 2020, Ihor Kolomoisky's 1+1 media group was actively promoting For the Future.

In the 2020 Ukrainian local elections, For the Future managed to win several mayoral races and won seats on many local councils. However, compared with the large money it had invested in the election campaign, its result was underwhelming. (Cherkasy mayor Bondarenko was reelected.) 3,773 people won seats in local councils on behalf of the party, that is about 11.42% of the available seats.

On 8 October 2021, one of the party's MPs Anton Polyakov died.

== Challenges and controversies ==
Only 15 or more deputies may form a parliamentary faction and an MP may be a member of only one faction at a time. The chairman and his two vice-chairmen may not be the heads of factions. Under current parliamentary rules a faction of non-partisan politicians can not be smaller than the smallest faction of a political party. After Viktor Baloha left the For the Future parliamentary faction on 20 December the faction was one MP short, MP Bohdan Torohtiy entry into the faction saved it from being dissolved.

In December 2025, For the Future MP Anna Skorokhod was investigated by Ukraine's anti-corruption authorities for allegedly leading a criminal group engaged in extortion and bribery, including an attempt to solicit $250,000 from a businessman. Skorokhod was declared a suspect by the National Anti-Corruption Bureau (NABU) and the Security Service of Ukraine (SBU) in connection with the alleged extortion scheme.

== Election results ==
=== Parliamentary elections ===
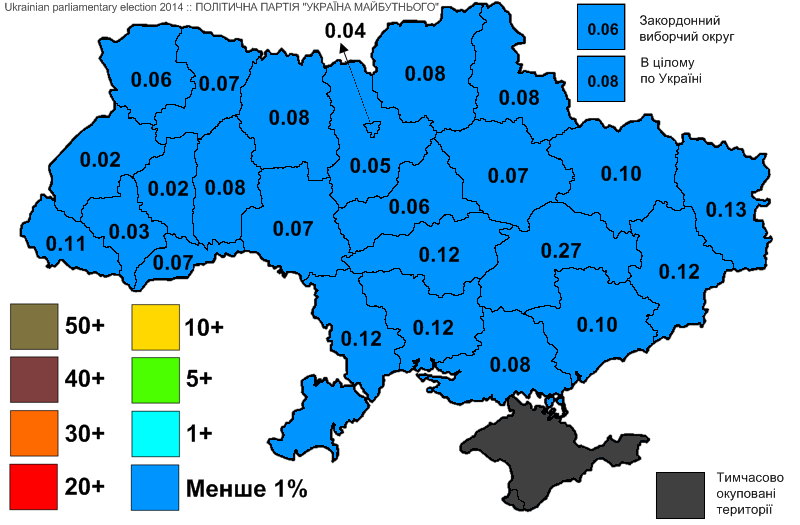
"Ukraine of the Future" election results in the 2014 Ukrainian parliamentary election

Ukraine of the Future
Election	Leader	Performance					Rank	Government
Election	Leader	Votes	%	± pp	Seats	+/–	Rank	Government
2012	Svyatoslav Oliynyk	38,544	0.19%	New	0 / 450	New	15th	Extra-parliamentary
2014	Svyatoslav Oliynyk	14,168	0.08%	▼0.11%	0 / 450	0	▼23rd	Extra-parliamentary
2019	Svyatoslav Oliynyk	Did not contest						Extra-parliamentary

For the Future
Election	Leader	Performance					Rank	Government
Election	Leader	Votes	%	± pp	Seats	+/–	Rank	Government
2019	Ihor Palytsia	formed at the first session of parliament			23 / 450	New	▲5th	Support
