= Yevhen Chervonenko =

Ukrainian politician and racing driver

- Євген Червоненко
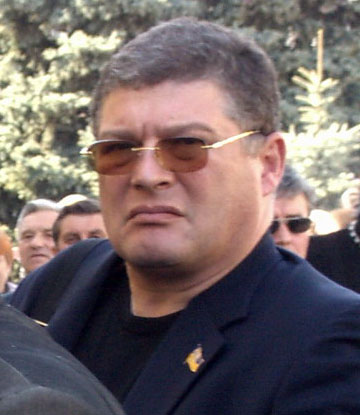
- Chervonenko in 2003

Governor of Zaporizhzhia Oblast
- In office 8 December 2005 – 24 December 2007
- President: Viktor Yushchenko
- Preceded by: Anatoliy Holovko
- Succeeded by: Valeriy Cherkaska (acting)

Minister of Transportation and Communication
- In office 4 February 2005 – 28 September 2005
- President: Viktor Yushchenko
- Prime Minister: Yulia Tymoshenko
- Preceded by: Heorhiy Kirpa
- Succeeded by: Viktor Bondar

People's Deputy of Ukraine
- In office 14 May 2002 – 17 March 2005
- Constituency: Our Ukraine Bloc, No. 30

Personal details
- Born: 20 December 1959 (age 66) Dnipropetrovsk, Ukrainian SSR, Soviet Union (now Dnipro, Ukraine)
- Party: Our Ukraine
- Education: National Mining University of Ukraine
- Occupation: politician, racing driver

Yevhen Alfredovych Chervonenko (Ukrainian: Євген Альфредович Червоненко; born 20 December 1959) is a Ukrainian politician and racing driver who served as governor of Zaporizhzhia Oblast from 2005 to 2007. Chervonenko previously served as Minister of Transportation and Communication in 2005, and as a People's Deputy of Ukraine from 2002 to 2005.

== Biography ==
He was born on 20 December 1959, in Dnipropetrovsk, and is of Jewish descent. Yevhen Chervonenko studied at the elite Dnipropetrovsk school number 23. He extramurally studied at Physics and Mathematics School of Moscow Institute of Physics and Technology. In 1982 he graduated from the Faculty of Mechanical Engineering of National Mining University of Ukraine (Dnipropetrovsk). Being a student, he worked as a mechanic at Sovtransavto. During summer holidays he worked as a truck driver.

In 1982–1985 he was the design engineer of the special design department of the «Dnepromashobogaschenie» Institute.

In 1986 he became a professional car driver in racing, later – the member of the USSR national team, master of sports of the USSR of international class in rallying, prize winner of the European and USSR championships. In 1987 he established the first in the USSR professional auto racing team "Perestroika".

As a rally racer he became the Champion of Ukraine and the Champion of Ukrainian Games (1983), USSR Master of Sports, member of the USSR national team (1985), winner and prize winner of the European Championship, Champion of the USSR Peoples Games (1988), USSR Master of Sports of international class (1989), USSR rally champion.

In 1988, he established the "Trans-Rally" freight company.

In 1992, he founded the "Lviv Van Pur" joint venture company – the first company in the CIS that mastered the production of canned beer and canned soft drinks.

In 1994–1995 Yevhen Chervonenko was the chairman of the "Rogan Van Pur" joint venture company, Head of the Industrial Group "Ukraine Van Pur", Member of the Ukrainian Union of Industrialists and Entrepreneurs (UUIE).

Since 1997, he has been a board member of the UUIE, Head of the Commission for the Development of Entrepreneurship, Vice President of the "Kyiv-Taipei" Society, member of the Council of Employers and Producers under the President of Ukraine, President of the "Orlan" Concern.

In 1997–2000 Yevhen Chervonenko served as the president (owner) of the "Orlan" concern, which specified in the production of non-alcoholic beverages and freight traffic. In 2001–2002 he became the honorary president of the "Orlan" concern.

Since 1998 he has started his political career. He was the People's Deputy of the Verkhovna Rada of Ukraine of the IV convocation, from the Our Ukraine party. During the elections for the post of President of Ukraine in 2004, Yevhen Chervonenko headed the personal security guard of Viktor Yushchenko. From November 2004 to January 2005 he was the member of the National Salvation Committee.

Since January 2001 – the President of the Shooting Federation of Ukraine. Since April 2002 – Vice-President of the Eurasian Jewish Congress.

From February to September 2005 he was the Minister of Transport and Communications. 17 March 2005 Yevhen Chervonenko resigned deputy powers. He held the post of Head of Zaporizhzhia Regional State Administration in 2005–2007.

In 2008–2010 Yevhen Chervonenko worked as the First Deputy Head of Kyiv City State Administration. From March 2011 – the Head of the Aviation Department of the Emergencies Ministry of Ukraine, then – Assistant of Minister Viktor Baloha. He was also the head of security of President Yushchenko, who offered him the position of the head of the Ministry of Internal Affairs.

After finishing his political career he started a new project — "A2B.Direct". "A2B.Direct" is an online service that provides direct interaction between carriers and cargo holders at all stages. This service provides the search for the best cargo carrier, is able to keep in touch with the driver 24/7, provides the entire workflow cycle, insurance and legal support. Service users are able to track their cargo online and completely get rid of forwarding margins. Carriers and landowners are able to quickly find current deals and plan their load, reducing idle runs to a minimum.

Chervonenko was an independent candidate in Ukraine's 79th electoral district (which included the cities Vasylivka and Enerhodar and surrounding settlements) in the 2014 Ukrainian parliamentary election. He finished fourth with 11.49% of the vote, the winner, Volodomyr Bandurov, (another independent candidate) got 21.81% of the vote.

In the 2019 Ukrainian parliamentary election Chervonenko unsuccessfully participated in a constituency of Odesa. In constituency 134 situated in Odesa's Malynovsky Raion as an independent candidate he with 16.85% of the votes finished second after Oleh Koliev of the Servant of the People party (Koliev Gained 35.12%).

In the October 2020 Ukrainian local elections Chervonenko was a candidate for Mayor of Odesa for the party Our Land.

== Awards and honors ==
- The Order of Merit, III class (1997), II class (1999), I class (2004)
- The Order of Prince Yaroslav the Wise, V class (2009)
- The winner of the contest "Man of the Year" in the nomination "Entrepreneur of the Year" (1999)
- The gold medal of the International Personnel Academy "For effective management" (2000)
- The Honorable Count of the Chivalery Order of the Archangel Michael (2001)
- The Winner of the All-Ukrainian program "Leaders of the Regions" (2002)
- Award weapon, presented by Interior Minister Yuriy Lutsenko
- The Order of the Polar Star(Sweden, 1999), awarded by the King of Sweden Charles XVI Gustav
- The Order of Merit for the Republic of Poland (Poland)
- The Order for Outstanding Achievement (2000)
- The Order of St. Stanislav, III class
- The Commander of the Order of Knightly Valor, II class

Political offices
Preceded by Heorhiy Kirpa	Minister of Transport and Communication of Ukraine; 2005	Succeeded by Viktor Bondar

Political offices
Preceded by Anatoliy Holovko	Governor of Zaporizhzhia Oblast; 2005–2007	Succeeded by Valeriy Cherkaska (acting)
