= Bortnychi =

Neighbourhood in Kyiv, Ukraine

Coordinates: 50°23′2.02″N 30°41′43.65″E

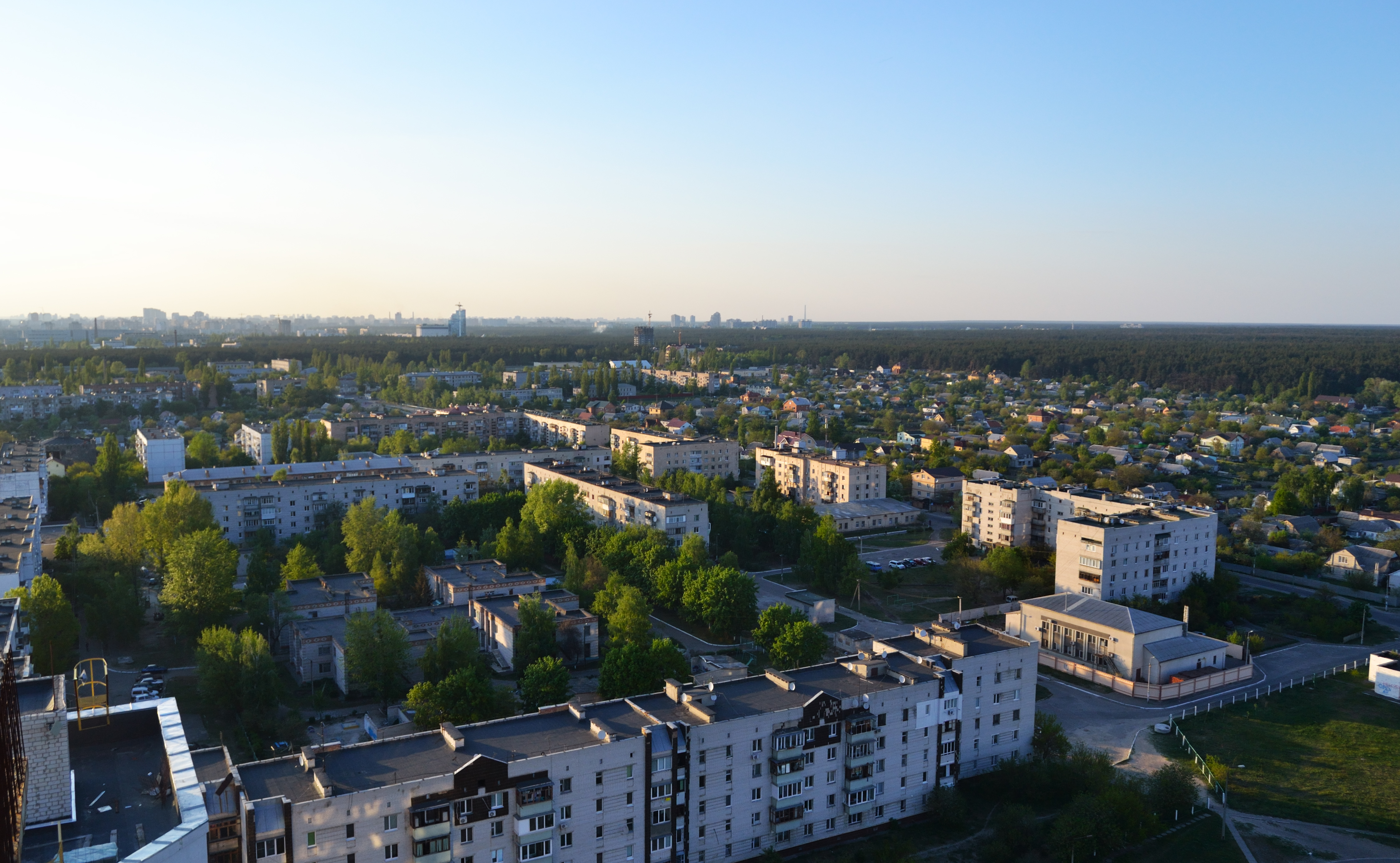
Panorama of Bortnychi.

Bortnychi (Ukrainian: Бортничі) is a historic neighbourhood in the southern part of Kyiv. Its southern and eastern boundaries are bordered with forests. Now Bortnychi is included in the Darnytsia Raion.

In 1969 parts of Bortnychi were designated for new villages of Shchaslyve and Prolisky.
