= Shmyhal Government =

2020–2025 government of Ukraine

- 21st Cabinet of Ukraine

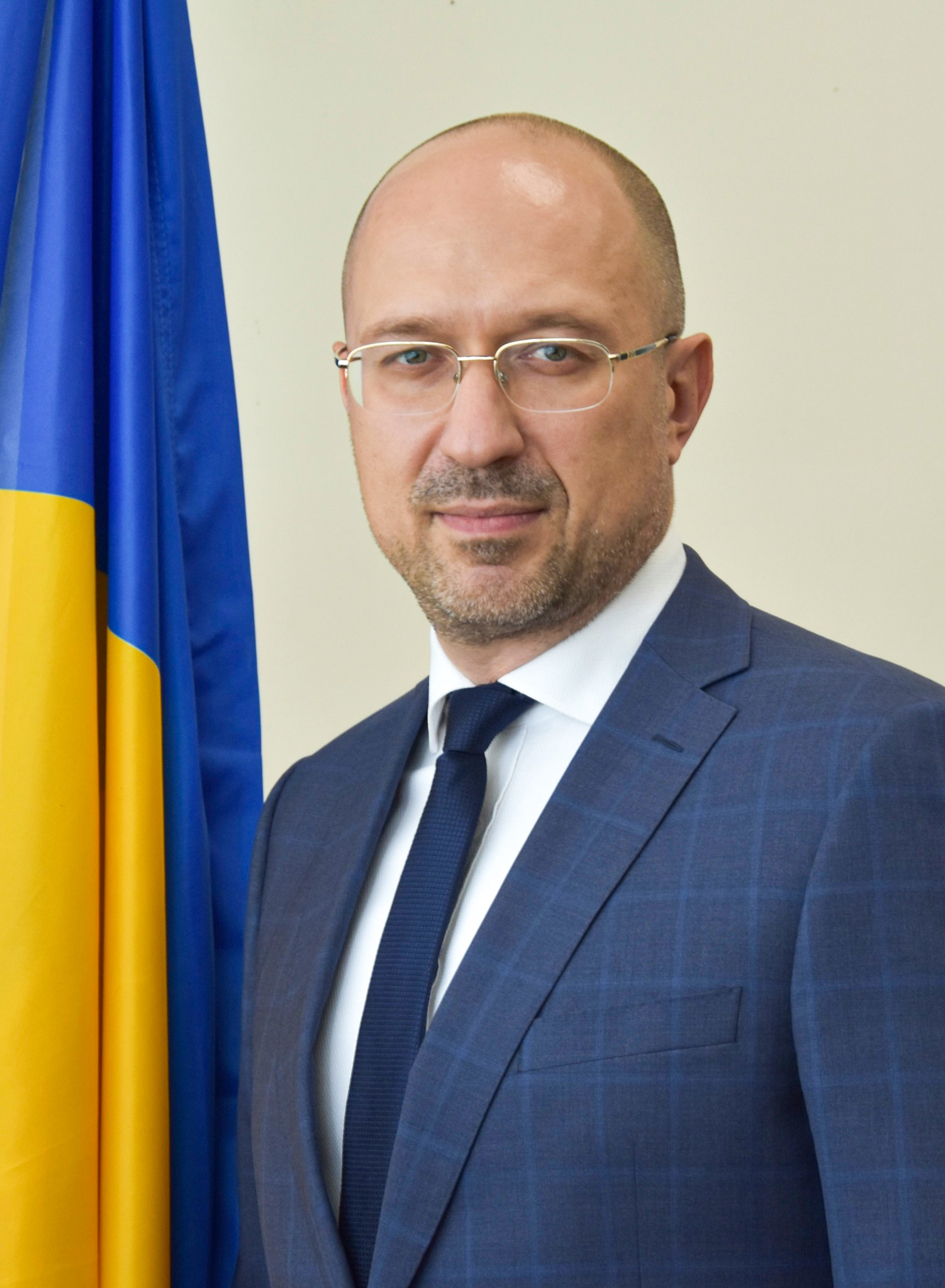
- Date formed: 4 March 2020
- Date dissolved: 17 July 2025

People and organisations
- President: Volodymyr Zelenskyy
- Prime Minister: Denys Shmyhal
- First Deputy Prime Minister: Oleksiy Lyubchenko (2021); Yulia Svyrydenko (2021–2025)
- Deputy Prime Ministers: Mykhailo Fedorov (2020–2025); Vadym Prystaiko (2020); Oleksiy Reznikov (2020–2021); Olha Stefanishyna (2020–2025); Oleh Uruskyi (2020–2021); Iryna Vereshchuk (2021–2024); Oleksandr Kubrakov (2022–2024); Oleksii Kuleba (2024–2025); Oleksii Chernyshov (2024–2025)
- No. of ministers: 21 (Note: Including the Prime Minister)
- Member party: Servant of the People (Note: Currently, and at various times previously, the cabinet also included current or former members of other political parties, such as People's Front or Holos, despite those parties never formally joining the coalition.)
- Status in legislature: Majority government
- Opposition parties: European Solidarity; Batkivshchyna; Platform for Life and Peace; Holos; Restoration of Ukraine
- Opposition leaders: Petro Poroshenko; Yulia Tymoshenko; Yuriy Boyko; Kira Rudyk; Antonina Slavytska

History
- Election: 2019 Ukrainian parliamentary election
- Legislature term: IX Rada
- Predecessor: Honcharuk Government
- Successor: Svyrydenko Government

The Shmyhal government (Ukrainian: Уряд Дениса Шмигаля, romanized: Uriad Denysa Shmyhalia) was the 5th government of Ukraine after 2014 revolution, formed on 4 March 2020 and led by Denys Shmyhal, who was previously serving as deputy prime minister in the Honcharuk government, and the Governor of Ivano-Frankivsk Oblast. Shmyhal is the longest-serving prime minister in Ukrainian history.

The government was dismissed on 16 July 2025 with 261 votes "for", following the resignation of Prime Minister Denys Shmyhal.

== History ==
President Volodymyr Zelenskyy's first government was the Honcharuk Government, formed after the 2019 Ukrainian parliamentary election. However, Zelenskyy was dissatisfied with the government due to high ministerial salaries and poor performance. On 3 March 2020, Prime Minister Oleksiy Honcharuk tendered his resignation, and by law this triggered the automatic resignation of the Honcharuk Government. In his 4 March 2020 address to the parliament, Zelenskyy expressed his hope for a stronger government, and that day Honcharuk was dismissed by the Verkhovna Rada (Ukraine's parliament) and Denys Shmyhal was appointed prime minister.

The transition from the Honcharuk government was treated in some local press as worrisome, with the Kyiv Post calling it "hasty" and "awkward".

=== Appointment of Shmyhal ===
The appointment of Shmyhal as the Prime Minister of Ukraine was approved by the Verkhovna Rada in a special session on 4 March 2020. Shmyhal was an acting vice prime minister at the time of his appointment; he had previously served as Governor of Ivano-Frankivsk Oblast. 291 people's deputies voted for his candidacy, while the members of most of the other factions (Opposition Platform — For Life, European Solidarity, Batkivshchyna, and Holos) did not support it.

Appointment vote Denys Shmyhal (Independent) (Note: Nominated by the Servant of the People)
Faction		For	Against	Abstained	Did not vote	Absent
Servant of the People	248	242	0	1	0	5
Opposition Platform — For Life	44	0	35	2	3	4
European Solidarity	27	0	24	0	1	2
Batkivshchyna	24	0	0	20	1	3
For the Future	22	18	0	0	2	2
Independents	21	14	0	4	1	2
Holos	20	0	0	19	1	0
Dovira	17	17	0	0	0	0
Total	423	291	59	46	9	18

== Composition ==
At the time of appointment of the government five minister seats remained vacant at the following ministries: the Ministry of Economy, the Ministry of Agriculture, the Ministry of Energy, the Ministry of Culture, and the Ministry of Education. Four ministers kept the same post as they had in the previous Honcharuk government: the Digital Transformation Minister Mykhailo Fedorov, Justice Minister Denys Maliuska, Infrastructure Minister Vladyslav Krykliy, and Interior Minister Arsen Avakov. Two ministers switched posts: Vadym Prystaiko left the Foreign Ministry and became the Deputy Prime Minister for Eurointegration while Dmytro Kuleba did the complete opposite, taking on the post of the minister of foreign affairs. On 18 May 2021 parliament dismissed Krykliy as minister.

All the ministerial posts — apart from those of the Ministers of Defense and Minister of Foreign Affairs that were put forward for voting by President Zelensky as these post are presidential nominations — were voted in by a package vote, with the support of 277 people's deputies.

Health Minister Illia Yemets and Finance Minister Ihor Umanskyi were dismissed by the parliament on 30 March 2020.

Initially the government did not have a separate Environmental Minister (the Ministry of Energy and Environmental Protection was at first responsible for environmental policies), but on 19 June 2020 Roman Abramovsky was appointed Minister of Environmental Protection and Natural Resources.

On 4 July 2020 President Zelenskyy announced that a (new post of) Deputy Prime Minister for Industrial Policy could appear in the government in a week. On 16 July 2020 Oleh Urusky was appointed Vice Prime Minister responsible for the new Ministry of Strategic Industries of Ukraine.

In the (previous government installed in August 2019) Honcharuk government the ministry responsible for agricultural policies was the Ministry of Economic Development, Trade and Agriculture. But in January 2020 President Zelenskyy stated the need to split the agriculture part of this Ministry. When the Shmyhal government was formed the Minister (in the Honcharuk government) of Economic Development, Trade and Agriculture, Tymofiy Mylovanov refused to head a newly reestablish Ministry of Agriculture. On 9 July 2020 Zelenskyy predicted that "at maximum in September" Ukraine would have a separate Minister of Agriculture again. On 17 December 2020 Roman Leshchenko was appointed as Minister of Agricultural Policy and Food. Mykola Solskyi replaced him on 24 March 2022.

Veteran Minister Serhiy Bessarab resigned on 16 December 2020 for health reasons. He was replaced two days later with Yulia Laputina.

On 18 May 2021 the Ukrainian parliament dismissed Ihor Petrashko as Minister of Economic Development and Trade. Two days later his successor became Oleksiy Liubchenko, who was also appointed First Deputy Prime Minister. Liubchenko was dismissed by Parliament on 3 November 2021.

On 12 July 2021 Minister of Internal Affairs Arsen Avakov announced that he had submitted his resignation as Interior Minister, and his resignation was accepted by parliament two days later. On 16 July 2021 Denys Monastyrsky was appointed Avakov's successor. Following his January 2023 death in a helicopter crash, Monastyrsky was succeeded by Ihor Klymenko on 7 February 2023.

Environmental minister Roman Abramovsky and minister of Strategic Industries of Ukraine Oleh Urusky and Minister of Defence Andriy Taran were dismissed by Parliament on 3 November 2021.

On 2 December 2022 the Ministry of Communities and Territories Development and the Ministry of Infrastructure were merged, creating the Ministry of Development of Communities, Territories and Infrastructure. Infrastructure minister Oleksandr Kubrakov took over as head of the combined ministry.

Three Ministers were dismissed by parliament on 20 March 2023; Minister of Education and Science Serhiy Shkarlet, Minister of Strategic Industries Pavlo Riabikin and the Minister of Digital Transformation Mykhailo Fedorov. The same day parliament received Prime Minister Shmyhal's submissions on the appointment of three ministers; Mykhailo Fedorov as Deputy Prime Minister for Innovation, Development of Education, Science and Technology, Minister of Digital Transformation, Oksen Lisovyi as Minister of Education and Science and Oleksandr Kamyshin as Minister of Strategic Industries. On 21 March 2023 all three were appointed to these posts.

On 27 July 2023 Minister of Culture and Information Policy Oleksandr Tkachenko was dismissed by parliament after criticism, also by President Zelenskyy, of government spending on Ukrainian culture during wartime.

On 6 September 2023 Rustem Umierov replaced Oleksii Reznikov as defense minister of Ukraine.

On 19 November 2024 President Zelenskyy announced the creation of a new (to be formed) ministry, the Ministry of Unification of Ukrainians. Zelenskyy claimed this new ministry was necessary for the "institutional strengthening of the policy towards Ukrainians abroad, towards our people from all waves of migration."

On 3 December 2024 Oleksiy Chernyshov was appointed as the Minister of National Unity of Ukraine. He was also appointed Deputy Prime Minister of Ukraine. The Ministry of Reintegration of Temporarily Occupied Territories was renamed to the Ministry of National Unity of Ukraine.

Office	Name	Took office	Left office	Party
Prime Minister	Denys Shmyhal	4 March 2020	17 July 2025	Independent (SN)
Deputy Prime Minister; Minister of Digital Transformation	Mykhailo Federov	4 March 2020	20 March 2023	SN
Deputy Prime Minister; Minister for Reintegration of the Temporarily Occupied Territories	Oleksii Reznikov	4 March 2020	3 November 2021	Independent (SN)
Deputy Prime Minister for European and Euro-Atlantic Integration of Ukraine	Vadym Prystaiko	4 March 2020	4 June 2020	Independent (SN)
Minister of Foreign Affairs	Dmytro Kuleba	4 March 2020	5 September 2024	Independent (Note: Nominated by the President)
Minister of Defence	Andrii Taran	4 March 2020	3 November 2021	Independent
Minister of Justice	Denys Maliuska	4 March 2020	4 September 2024	SN
Minister of Finance	Ihor Umanskyi	4 March 2020	30 March 2020	Independent (SN)
Minister of Internal Affairs	Arsen Avakov	4 March 2020	15 July 2021	NF
Minister of Infrastructure	Vladyslav Kryklii	4 March 2020	18 May 2021	SN
Minister of Social Policy	Maryna Lazebna	4 March 2020	18 July 2022	Independent (SN)
Minister of Communities and Territories Development	Oleksii Chernyshov	4 March 2020	3 November 2022	SN
Minister of Youth and Sports (Note: After the appointment of Denys Shmyhal as a Prime Minister, it was proposed to divide the previously merged ministry in 2019 in two: Ministry of Youth and Sports and Ministry of Culture and Information Policу.)	Vadym Huttsait	4 March 2020	9 November 2023	Independent (SN)
Minister of Culture, Youth and Sports	Anatolii Maksymchuk (acting)	4 March 2020	10 March 2020	Independent (SN)
Minister of Health	Illia Yemets	4 March 2020	30 March 2020	Independent (SN)
Minister of Veterans Affairs	Serhii Bessarab	4 March 2020	16 December 2020	Independent (SN)
Minister of Cabinet of Ministers	Oleh Nemchinov	4 March 2020	16 July 2025	Independent (SN)
=== Changes March 2020 ===
Office	Name	Took office	Left office	Party
Minister of Economic Development, Trade and Agriculture	Pavlo Kukhta (acting)	10 March 2020	17 March 2020	Holos
Minister of Culture, Youth and Sports	Svitlana Fomenko (acting)	10 March 2020	23 March 2020	Independent (SN)
Minister of Education and Science	Yurii Poliukhovych (acting)	10 March 2020	25 March 2020	Independent (SN)
Minister of Energy and Environment	Vitalii Shubin (acting)	10 March 2020	16 April 2020	Independent (SN)
Minister of Economic Development, Trade and Agriculture	Ihor Petrashko	17 March 2020	18 May 2021	Independent (SN)
Minister of Culture and Information Policy	Svitlana Fomenko (acting)	23 March 2020	4 June 2020	Independent (SN)
Minister of Education and Science	Lubomyra Mandzii (acting)	25 March 2020	25 June 2020	Independent (SN)
Minister of Finance	Serhii Marchenko	30 March 2020	16 July 2025	Independent (SN)
Minister of Health	Maksym Stepanov	30 March 2020	18 May 2021	SN
=== Changes April 2020 ===
Office	Name	Took office	Left office	Party
Minister of Energy and Environment	Olha Buslavets (acting)	16 April 2020	3 June 2020	Independent (SN)
=== Changes June 2020 ===
Office	Name	Took office	Left office	Party
Minister of Energy (Note: Previously merged ministry since 2019 was divided in two: Ministry of Energy and Ministry of Environmental Protection and Natural Resources.)	Olha Buslavets (acting)	3 June 2020	20 November 2020	Independent (SN)
Deputy Prime Minister for European and Euro-Atlantic Integration of Ukraine	Olha Stefanishyna	4 June 2020	4 September 2024	SN (Note: Appointed as non-partisan, later joined Servant of the People)
Minister of Culture and Information Policy	Oleksandr Tkachenko	4 June 2020	27 July 2023	SN
Minister of Environmental Protection and Natural Resources	Roman Abramovskyi	19 June 2020	3 November 2021	Independent (SN)
Minister of Education and Science	Serhii Shkarlet	25 June 2020 (Note: Acting since 25 June 2020 until 17 December 2020.)	20 March 2023	Independent (SN)
=== Changes July 2020 ===
Office	Name	Took office	Left office	Party
Deputy Prime Minister; Minister of Strategic Industries	Oleh Uruskyi	16 July 2020	3 November 2021	Independent (SN)
=== Changes November 2020 ===
Office	Name	Took office	Left office	Party
Minister of Energy	Yurii Boiko (acting)	20 November 2020	21 December 2020	Independent (SN)
=== Changes December 2020 ===
Office	Name	Took office	Left office	Party
Minister of Agrarian Policy and Food (Note: Previously merged ministry since 2019 was divided in two: Ministry of Economy and Ministry of Agrarian Policy and Food.)	Roman Leshchenko	17 December 2020	24 March 2022	Independent (SN)
Minister of Veterans Affairs	Yulia Laputina	18 December 2020	7 February 2024	Independent (SN)
Minister of Energy	Yurii Vitrenko (acting)	21 December 2020	28 April 2021	Independent (SN)
=== Changes April 2021 ===
Office	Name	Took office	Left office	Party
Minister of Energy	Herman Halushchenko	29 April 2021	16 July 2025	Independent (SN)
=== Changes May 2021 ===
Office	Name	Took office	Left office	Party
Minister of Health	Viktor Liashko	20 May 2021	16 July 2025	Independent (SN)
Minister of Infrastructure	Oleksandr Kubrakov	20 May 2021	1 December 2022	SN
First Deputy Prime Minister; Minister of Economy	Oleksii Liubchenko	20 May 2021	3 November 2021	Independent (SN)
=== Changes July 2021 ===
Office	Name	Took office	Left office	Party
Minister of Internal Affairs	Denys Monastyrsky	16 July 2021	18 January 2023	SN
=== Changes November 2021 ===
Office	Name	Took office	Left office	Party
First Deputy Prime Minister; Minister of Economy	Yulia Svyrydenko	4 November 2021	16 July 2025	Independent (SN)
Deputy Prime Minister; Minister for Reintegration of the Temporarily Occupied Territories	Iryna Vereshchuk	4 November 2021	5 September 2024	SN
Minister of Defence	Oleksii Reznikov	4 November 2021	5 September 2023	Independent
Minister of Strategic Industries	Pavlo Riabikin	4 November 2021	20 March 2023	Independent (SN)
Minister of Environmental Protection and Natural Resources	Ruslan Strilets	4 November 2021 (Note: Acting since 4 November 2021 until 15 April 2022.)	4 September 2024	Independent (SN)
=== Changes March 2022 ===
Office	Name	Took office	Left office	Party
Minister of Agrarian Policy and Food	Mykola Solskyi	24 March 2022	9 May 2024	SN
=== Changes July 2022 ===
Office	Name	Took office	Left office	Party
Minister of Social Policy	Oksana Zholnovych	19 July 2022	16 July 2025	Independent (SN)
=== Changes December 2022 ===
Office	Name	Took office	Left office	Party
Deputy Prime Minister for Restoration of Ukraine; Minister for Communities, Territories and Infrastructure Development (Note: On 2 December 2022 the Ministry of Communities and Territories Development and the Ministry of Infrastructure were merged, creating the Ministry of Communities, Territories and Infrastructure Development.)	Oleksandr Kubrakov	1 December 2022	9 May 2024	SN
=== Changes January 2023 ===
Office	Name	Took office	Left office	Party
Minister of Internal Affairs	Ihor Klymenko (Note: Acting since 18 January until 7 February 2023.)	18 January 2023	16 July 2025	Independent (SN)
=== Changes March 2023 ===
Office	Name	Took office	Left office	Party
Minister of Strategic Industries	Oleksandr Kamyshin	21 March 2023	4 September 2024	Independent (SN)
Deputy Prime Minister for Innovation, Education, Science and Technology Development; Minister of Digital Transformation	Mykhailo Fedorov (Note: Re-appointed as Deputy Prime Minister with additional powers on 21 March 2023.)	21 March 2023	16 July 2025	SN
Minister of Education and Science	Oksen Lisovyi	21 March 2023	16 July 2025	Independent (SN)
=== Changes July 2023 ===
Office	Name	Took office	Left office	Party
Minister of Culture and Information Policy	Rostyslav Karandieiev (acting)	28 July 2023	4 September 2024	Independent (SN)
=== Changes September 2023 ===
Office	Name	Took office	Left office	Party
Minister of Defence	Rustem Umierov	5 September 2023	17 July 2025	Holos
=== Changes November 2023 ===
Office	Name	Took office	Left office	Party
Minister of Youth and Sports	Matvii Bidnyi (Note: Acting since 9 November 2023 until 5 September 2024)	9 November 2023	16 July 2025	Independent (SN)
=== Changes February 2024 ===
Office	Name	Took office	Left office	Party
Minister of Veterans Affairs	Oleksandr Porkhun (acting)	9 February 2024	5 September 2024	Independent (SN)
=== Changes May 2024 ===
Office	Name	Took office	Left office	Party
Minister for Communities, Territories and Infrastructure Development	Vasyl Shkurakov (acting)	9 May 2024	5 September 2024	Independent (SN)
Minister of Agrarian Policy and Food	Taras Vysotskyi (acting)	9 May 2024	5 September 2024	Independent (SN)
=== Changes September 2024 ===
Office	Name	Took office	Left office	Party
Minister of Foreign Affairs	Andrii Sybiha	5 September 2024	16 July 2025	Independent
Deputy Prime Minister for European and Euro-Atlantic Integration of Ukraine; Minister of Justice	Olha Stefanishyna	5 September 2024	16 July 2025	SN
Deputy Prime Minister for Restoration of Ukraine; Minister for Communities and Territories Development	Oleksii Kuleba	5 September 2024	16 July 2025	Independent (SN)
Minister of Environmental Protection and Natural Resources	Svitlana Hrynchuk	5 September 2024	16 July 2025	Independent (SN)
Ministry of Culture and Strategic Communications (Note: Renamed from the Ministry of Culture and Information Policy following the appointment of Mykola Tochytskyi as the minister.)	Mykola Tochytskyi	5 September 2024	16 July 2025	Independent (SN)
Minister of Veterans Affairs	Natalia Kalmykova	5 September 2024	16 July 2025	Independent (SN)
Minister of Strategic Industries	Herman Smetanin	5 September 2024	16 July 2025	Independent (SN)
Minister of Agrarian Policy and Food	Vitalii Koval	5 September 2024	16 July 2025	SN
Minister for Reintegration of the Temporarily Occupied Territories	Taras Vysotskyi (acting)	6 September 2024	3 December 2024	Independent (SN)
=== Changes December 2024 ===
Office	Name	Took office	Left office	Party
Deputy Prime Minister; Minister of National Unity of Ukraine	Oleksii Chernyshov	3 December 2024	16 July 2025	SN

== See also ==
- 9th Ukrainian Verkhovna Rada
