= Yulia Laputina =

Ukrainian politician

- Юлія Лапутіна
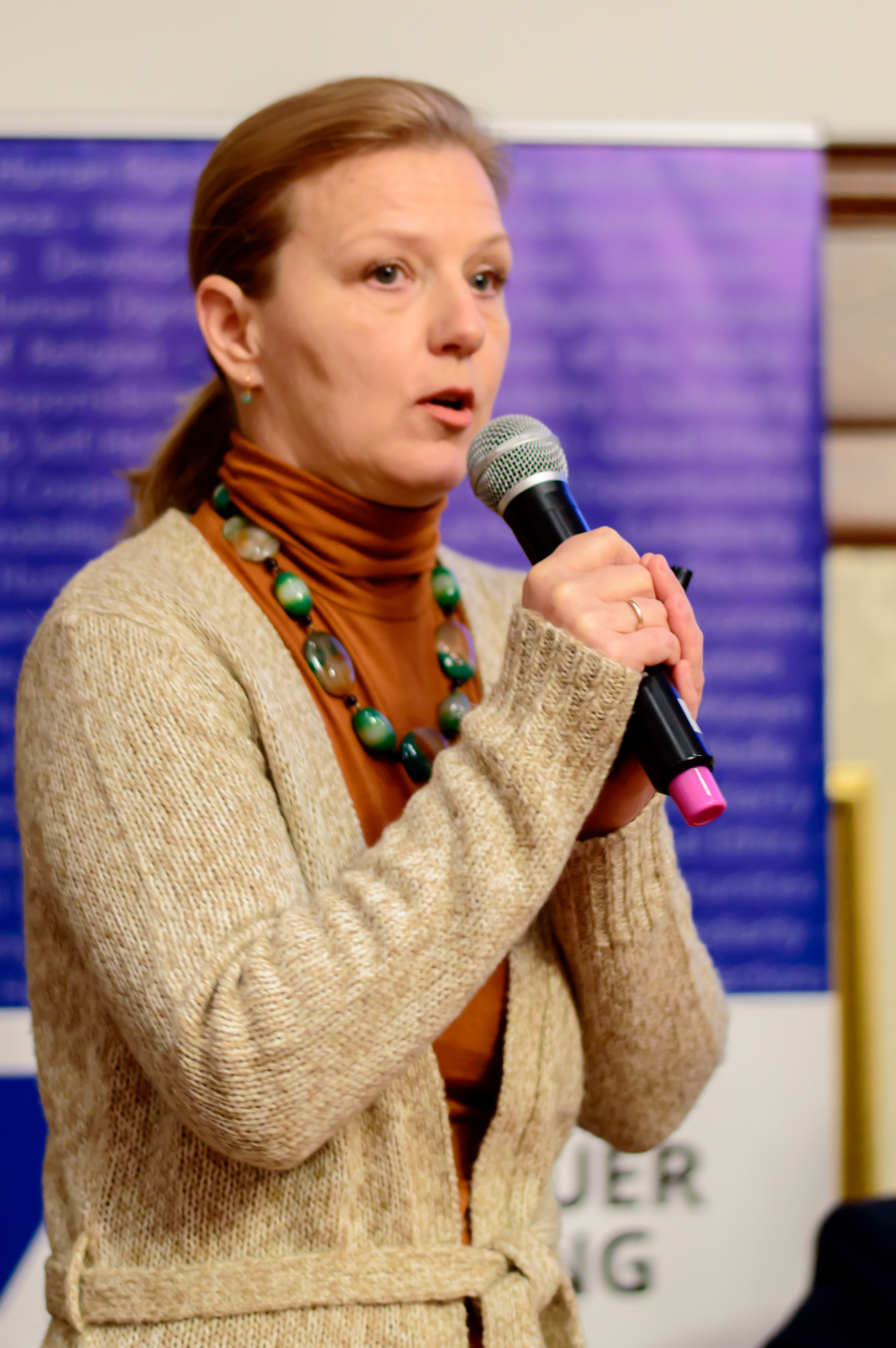
- Laputina in 2019

Minister of Veterans Affairs
- In office 18 December 2020 – 7 February 2024
- President: Volodymyr Zelenskyy
- Prime Minister: Denys Shmyhal
- Preceded by: Serhiy Bessarab
- Succeeded by: Natalia Kalmykova

Personal details
- Born: 1967 (age 58–59) Kyiv, Ukrainian SSR, Soviet Union (now Ukraine)
- Party: Independent

Yulia Anatoliyivna Laputina (Ukrainian: Юлія Анатоліївна Лапутіна, IPA: [ˈjul⁽ʲ⁾ijɐ ɐnɐˈtɔl⁽ʲ⁾ijiu̯nɐ lɐˈput⁽ʲ⁾inɐ]; born 1967) is a Ukrainian politician who has served as Minister of Veterans Affairs of Ukraine in the Shmyhal Government since December 2020.

== Career ==
In 1988, Laputina graduated from the National University of Ukraine on Physical Education and Sport with a teacher and trainer diploma. In 1996, she graduated in law from the National Academy of the Security Service of Ukraine in Kyiv. She obtained the degree of candidate of sciences in the field of psychology. She was a researcher at one of the research institutes, in 1992 she became an officer of the Security Service of Ukraine. She held managerial positions in the SBU structure, she was responsible, inter alia, counterintelligence. During the war in Donbas, she led a task force for the service within the ATO (anti-terrorist operation).

In March 2020, Laputina was promoted to the rank of major general of the SBU. In the same year, she retired from service, and later served as the director general in the communication and information policy directorate of the Ministry of Reintegration of Temporarily Occupied Territories. In December 2020, she was Minister for Veterans Affairs in the government of Denys Shmyhal.

== Personal life ==
Laputina's husband also works in the Security Service of Ukraine. They have two daughters.
