= Oleksandr Kubrakov =

Ukrainian politician (born 1982)

- Олександр Кубраков
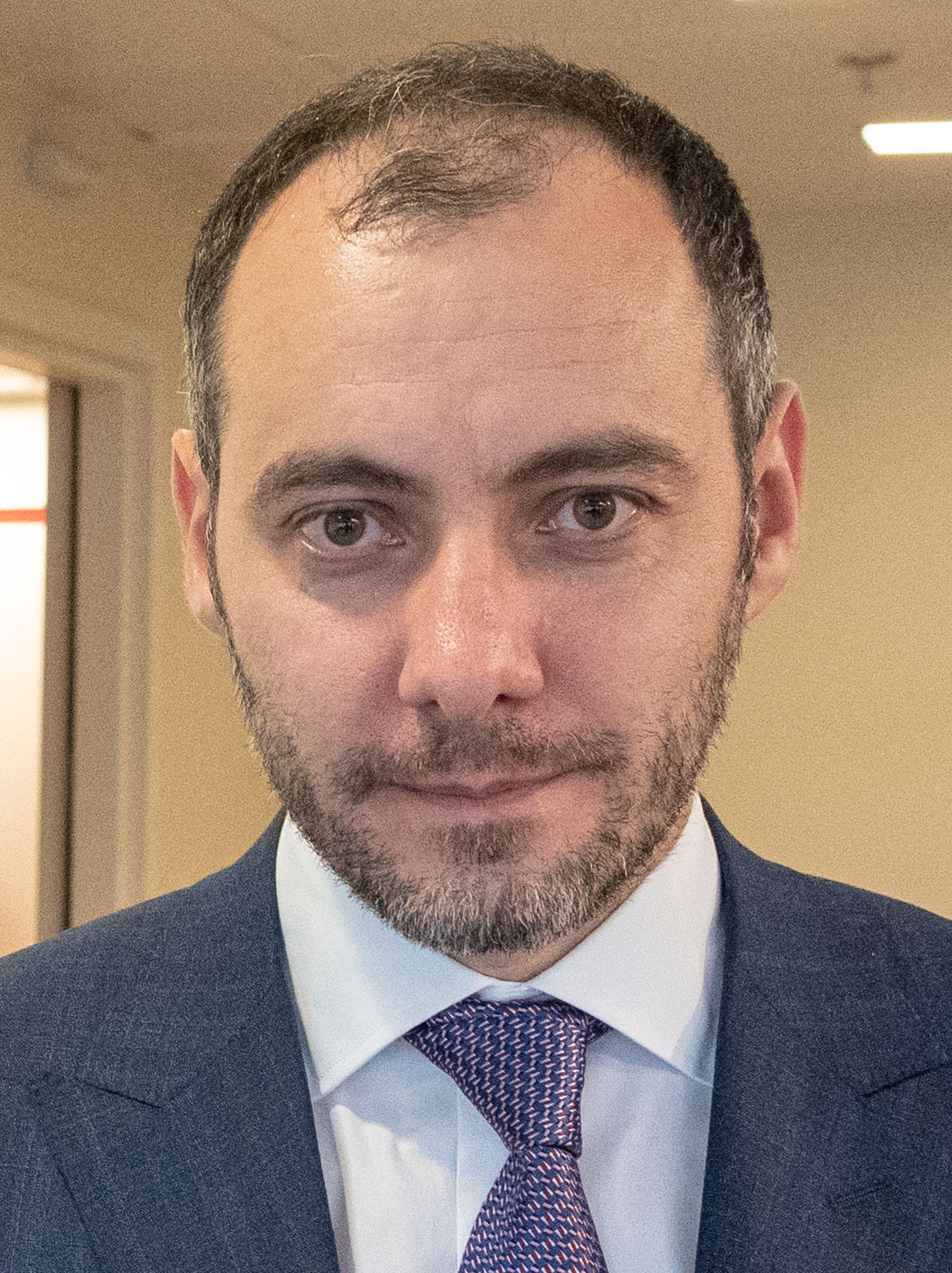
- Kubrakov in 2022

Minister of Infrastructure
- In office 20 May 2021 – 9 May 2024
- President: Volodymyr Zelenskyy
- Prime Minister: Denys Shmyhal
- Preceded by: Vladyslav Krykliy
- Succeeded by: Vasyl Shkurakov

Head of the State Agency of Automobile Roads of Ukraine
- In office 19 November 2019 – 20 May 2021

Personal details
- Born: 20 August 1982 (age 44) Pershotravensk, Ukrainian SSR, Soviet Union (now Ukraine)
- Party: Independent
- Education: Kyiv National Economic University; Harvard Kennedy School
- Occupation: civil servant

Oleksandr Mykolayovych Kubrakov (Ukrainian: Олександр Миколайович Кубраков; born 20 August 1982) is a Ukrainian economist, civil servant and politician. From May 2021 to June 2024, he served as Minister of Infrastructure of Ukraine.

== Biography ==
Kubrakov studied at the Kyiv National Economic University and completed a course in the Harvard Kennedy School.

Kubrakov was on a party list of the Servant of the People political party during the 2019 parliamentary elections, and was elected to the Verkhovna Rada (the Ukrainian parliament) in 2019. He surrendered his deputy mandate upon his appointment as a head of Ukravtodor on 3 December 2019.

On 15 November 2019 Kubrakov was determined the winner of the competition to assume the office of the chairperson of the State Agency for Motor Roads of Ukraine ("Ukrautodor") and on 19 November 2019 he was appointed to this position by a Government of Ukraine

On 20 May 2021 Kubrakov was appointed to the position of Minister of Infrastructure of Ukraine.

On 14 August 2022 Kubrakov posted on his Facebook account that Ukraine are preparing delivery and will be delivering 23 thousand tons of wheat to Ethiopia via the ship named the "BRAVE COMMANDER".

Kubrakov was included to the Time 100 for the year 2022 published on 28 September 2022 ranking of one hundred people who are "changing the future of the world.

On 2 December 2022 the Shmyhal Government merged the Ministry of Infrastructure with the Ministry of Communities and Territories Development creating the Ministry of Development of Communities, Territories and Infrastructure; Kubrakov remained as head of the combined ministry.

On 9 May 2024, the Verkhovna Rada voted to dismiss Kubrakov from his position as minister.

In January 2025, Kubrakov was appointed by defense minister Rustem Umerov as a voluntary adviser on logistics.

== Awards ==
- Order of Merit, 3rd class (2022).

== See also ==
- Shmyhal Government
- List of members of the parliament of Ukraine, 2019–24
