= Honcharuk government =

Government of Ukraine

Honcharuk Government
- 20th Cabinet of Ukraine (since 1990)

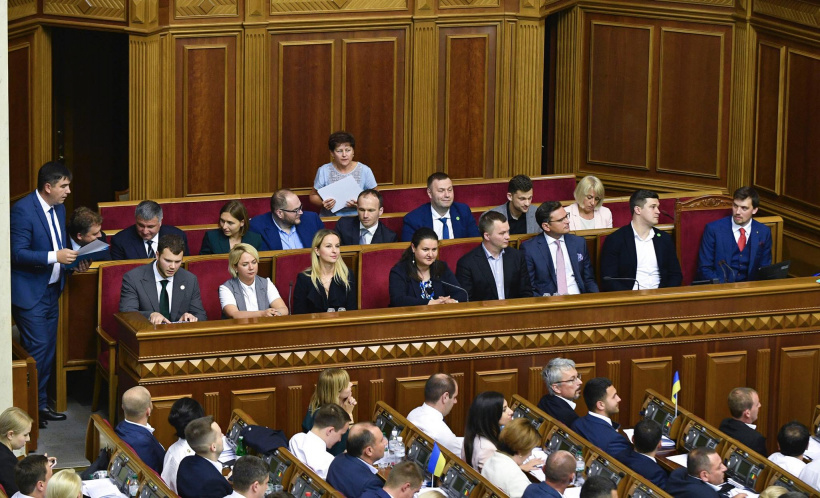
- Date formed: 29 August 2019
- Date dissolved: 4 March 2020

People and organisations
- Head of state: Volodymyr Zelenskyy
- Head of government: Oleksiy Honcharuk
- Member parties: Servant of the People
- Status in legislature: Majority
- Opposition parties: Opposition Platform — For Life; European Solidarity; Fatherland; Voice
- Opposition leaders: Yuriy Boyko; Vadim Rabinovich; Petro Poroshenko; Yulia Tymoshenko; Svyatoslav Vakarchuk

History
- Election: 2019 Ukrainian parliamentary election
- Legislature term: 5 years
- Predecessor: Groysman Government
- Successor: Shmyhal Government

The Honcharuk government was formed on 29 August 2019, and was led by Oleksiy Honcharuk. It was the fourth Ukrainian cabinet formed since the 2014 Ukrainian revolution, following the 2019 Ukrainian parliamentary election.

== History ==
=== Appointment of Honcharuk as prime minister ===
The appointment of Honcharuk as the prime minister of Ukraine was approved by the Verkhovna Rada (Ukraine's parliament) on 29 August 2019. Honcharuk at the time of his appointment was a deputy chairperson of the Presidential Office of Ukraine. 290 People's deputies voted for his candidacy, while the members of most of the other factions (Opposition Platform — For Life, European Solidarity, Fatherland, and Voice) did not support it.

Faction	Yes	No	Abstained	Did not vote	Total
Servant of the People	247	0	0	4	251
Opposition Platform — For Life	0	0	0	42	42
European Solidarity	0	26	0	1	27
Fatherland	0	0	12	11	23
For the Future	22	0	0	0	22
Voice	0	0	13	4	17
Non-affiliated	21	1	10	4	36
All factions	290	27	35	66	418

From the podium, the newly elected prime minister stated that in the upcoming years, each third hryvnia would go towards settling debts. The Prime Minister considered that the main indicator of business attractiveness had to become access to cheaper resources. Honcharuk promised to take control of the credit rate and Ukraine's image. He considered that credit with a 12-13 annual percentage rate is a reality. At the time of Honcharuk's appointment, 10 million Ukrainians lived below the poverty line and corruption continued to flourish.

In the new government no one will be stealing... Within a few weeks Ukraine will be visited by the IMF mission and we will negotiate a new agreement... In Ukraine we have an inadequate minimal living wage, it is impossible to survive on these wages.

— Oleksiy Honcharuk, the Verkhovna Rada podium

==== Criticism ====
- Opposition Platform — For Life said that the main task of the Prime Minister should not be Ukraine's image nor its economic development but ending the War in Donbas.
- European Solidarity questioned the transparency of the selection of the Prime Minister candidate.
- The leader of Fatherland, Yulia Tymoshenko told journalists on 29 August 2019 that even though her party did not support the appointment of Honcharuk, her party would support the government (working outside the majority) and would not sit on the opposition benches. Less than three months later, the party moved into opposition due to its disagreement with the government's plan to remove the long-standing moratorium on selling agricultural land.
- Voice did not support the appointment of Honcharuk as prime minister because it was not informed about the composition of the rest of the government.

=== Appointment of Bakanov to lead the Security Service of Ukraine ===
On 29 August 2019, the Ukrainian parliament also approved the appointment of Ivan Bakanov as Head of the Security Service of Ukraine.

Faction	Yes	No	Abstained	Did not vote	Total
Servant of the People	248	0	1	1	252
Opposition Platform — For Life	0	0	0	35	43
European Solidarity	0	26	1	0	27
Fatherland	21	0	0	0	24
For the Future	21	0	0	1	22
Voice	0	0	16	1	17
Non-affiliated	29	0	4	3	37
All factions	319	26	22	41	408

=== Appointment of Riaboshapka to lead the General Prosecutor's Office ===
Ruslan Riaboshapka replaced Yuriy Lutsenko as Prosecutor General of Ukraine on 29 August 2019.

Faction	Yes	No	Abstained	Did not vote	Total
Servant of the People	243	0	0	4	247
Opposition Platform — For Life	0	0	0	27	43
European Solidarity	0	26	0	1	27
Fatherland	23	0	0	0	24
For the Future	22	0	0	0	22
Voice	0	0	16	0	17
Non-affiliated	24	0	9	0	37
All factions	312	26	25	32	395

=== Parliamentary vote for the cabinet ===
Faction	Yes	No	Abstained	Did not vote	Total
Servant of the People	238	0	1	6	252
Opposition Platform — For Life	0	0	0	30	43
European Solidarity	0	26	0	0	27
Fatherland	0	0	17	5	24
For the Future	22	0	0	0	22
Voice	0	0	17	0	17
Non-affiliated	21	0	10	2	37
All factions	281	26	45	43	395

=== Appointment of Prystaiko as Minister of Foreign Affairs ===
Faction	Yes	No	Abstained	Did not vote	Total
Servant of the People	250	0	0	2	252
Opposition Platform — For Life	0	0	0	34	43
European Solidarity	0	0	25	1	27
Fatherland	21	0	0	1	24
For the Future	20	0	0	2	22
Voice	0	0	15	2	17
Non-affiliated	19	0	9	7	37
All factions	310	0	49	49	408

=== Appointment of Zahorodniuk as Minister of Defence ===
Faction	Yes	No	Abstained	Did not vote	Total
Servant of the People	248	0	0	3	252
Opposition Platform — For Life	0	0	1	36	43
European Solidarity	0	25	0	0	27
Fatherland	22	0	0	0	24
For the Future	21	0	0	1	22
Voice	0	0	9	5	17
Non-affiliated	23	0	4	7	37
All factions	314	25	14	52	405

=== Retention of Avakov in the new government ===
One of the most acute issues that were part of long discussions and negotiations was keeping the Minister of Internal Affairs Arsen Avakov who had held his post since the Revolution of Dignity. The newly elected prime minister Honcharuk noted that the decision to keep the minister was one of the most complex, yet for the Minister of Internal Affairs "drew certain red lines" which he could not cross.

== Fall ==
In early 2020, domestic media outlets reported that President Volodymyr Zelenskyy had lost confidence in Prime Minister Honcharuk due to the slow speed at which his government was carrying out reforms. Ukrainian media expected this lack of confidence would culminate in a vote in the Verkhovna Rada on March 4 in which Zelenskyy would propose sweeping changes to the government, including the appointment of a new prime minister.

On 3 March 2020 Honcharuk tendered his resignation and according to Ukrainian law the Prime Minister's resignation meant the automatic resignation of the entire government. Speaking before the vote on Honcharuk's dismissal, President Zelenskyy thanked him for his work, while blaming his government for an inefficient economic policy, a decline in industrial production and customs revenues, and accused them of poor communication with local authorities and the public, as well as failing to prepare for further reforms. The following day the Honcharuk government was replaced by the Shmyhal Government.

== Composition ==
The new government was cut to 17 ministers from the previous 25. The new cabinet was cut to 15 ministers from the previous 19.

Under the Constitution of Ukraine, the President of Ukraine submits nominations to parliament for the post of Minister of Foreign Affairs and Minister of Defense.

According to Ukrayinska Pravda, President Volodymyr Zelenskyy continued to hold interviews with candidates for Minister of Healthcare on the day the cabinet was appointed. On 31 August 2019, Servant of the People faction leader Davyd Arakhamia stated on ZIK channel that most likely the then current Healthcare Minister, Zoriana Skaletska, would be replaced by Mikhail Radutsky (who according to Arakhamia needed "about three months to prepare" for the post (in August 2019).

Servant of the People appointed five of its members on the party election list (who are not actual members of the party) as ministers in the Honcharuk government.

On 4 February 2020 Minister of Regional Development Aliona Babak was replaced by Denys Shmygal at her own request.

Nominating party key	Servant of the People
Presidential nominations	President Volodymyr Zelenskyy

Logo	Office	Incumbent
	Prime Minister	Oleksiy Honcharuk
	Vice Prime Minister (European integration)	Dmytro Kuleba
	Vice Prime Minister	Mykhailo Fedorov (Note: Fedorov is a non-partisan member of Ukrainian parliament and government.)
	Minister of Digital Transformation	Mykhailo Fedorov
	Vice Prime Minister	Denys Shmyhal (from February 2020)
	Minister of Internal Affairs	Arsen Avakov
	Minister of Foreign Affairs	Vadym Prystaiko
	Minister of Finance	Oksana Markarova
	Minister of Defence	Andriy Zahorodniuk
	Minister of Social Policy	Yuliya Sokolovska
	Minister of Temporarily Occupied Territories, IDPs and veterans	Oksana Koliada
	Minister of Justice	Denys Maliuska (Note: Maliuska is a non-partisan member of Ukrainian parliament and government.)
	Minister of Healthcare	Zoriana Skaletska
	Minister of Education	Hanna Novosad (Note: Novosad is a non-partisan member of Ukrainian parliament and government.)
	Ministry of Energy Generation and Protection of Environment	Oleksiy Orzhel (Note: Orzhel is a non-partisan member of Ukrainian parliament and government.)
	Minister of Infrastructure	Vladyslav Krykliy (Note: Krykliy is a non-partisan member of Ukrainian parliament and government.)
	Minister of Economic Development, Trade and Agriculture	Tymofiy Mylovanov
	Minister of Development of Communities and Territories	Alyona Babak (Note: Babak is a former member of Self-Reliance, but in 2019 she ran to the parliament as member of Servant of People and later was appointed to the government.) (until February 2020); Denys Shmyhal (from February 2020)
	Minister of Culture, Youth and Sports	Volodymyr Borodiansky
	Minister of the Cabinet of Ministers	Dmytro Dubilet

== See also ==
- 9th Ukrainian Verkhovna Rada
