= Ministry for Veterans Affairs (Ukraine) =

Government ministry of Ukraine

- Ukrainian: Міністерство з питань ветеранів
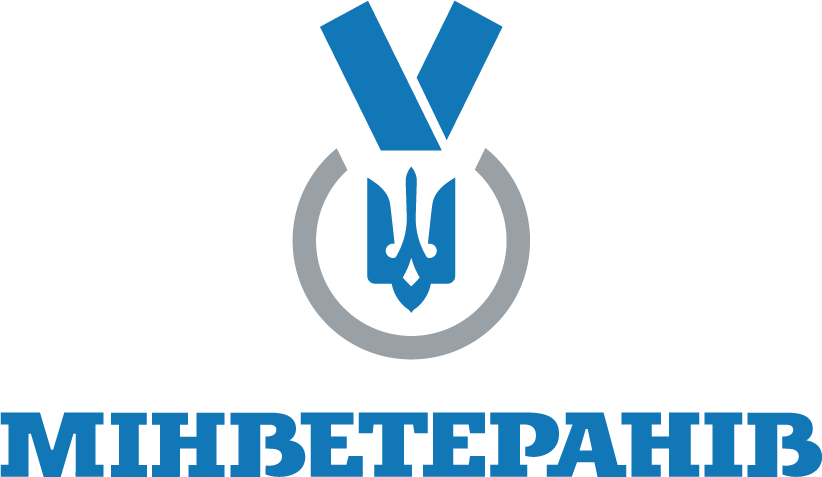

Department overview
- Formed: 22 November 2018
- Jurisdiction: Government of Ukraine
- Headquarters: Kyiv, Ukraine
- Minister responsible: Vitalii Kim
- Website: mva.gov.ua

The Ministry for Veterans Affairs (Ukrainian: Міністерство з питань ветеранів, romanized: Ministerstvo z pytanʹ veteraniv) is a government ministry in Ukraine.

The ministry was officially established on 22 November 2018. Between August 2019 and March 2020, the ministry was temporarily merged with the Ministry of Temporarily Occupied Territories and IDPs.

== History ==
On 27 February 2018, the Ukrainian Parliament adopted an appeal to the Cabinet of Ministers of Ukraine to create a Ministry for Veterans' Affairs "to ensure the formation and implementation of state policy in the field of social protection of war veterans." The appeal proposed to the Government to establish a Ministry for Veterans' Affairs on the basis of the State Service for War Veterans and Participants of the Anti-Terrorist Operation.

The Ministry's first minister was Iryna Friz, who was appointed (also) on 22 November 2018. On the day of her appointment Friz expected the ministry to be fully functional in June 2019.

On 29 August 2019, the Honcharuk Government merged the ministry with the Ministry of Temporarily Occupied Territories and IDPs. During this time, the agency existed as the State Service of Ukraine on Veterans Affairs that exists since 2014. On 4 March 2020, the new Shmyhal Government unmerged the two ministries.

== List of ministers ==
| Name of minister | Term of office | | Photo |
| Name of minister | Start | End | |
|---|---|---|---|
| Iryna Friz | 22 November 2018 | 29 August 2019 | |
merged with the Ministry of Temporarily Occupied Territories and IDPs
| Serhiy Bessarab | 4 March 2020 | 16 December 2020 | |
| Yulia Laputina | 18 December 2020 | 7 February 2024 | |
| Nataliya Kalmykova | 5 September 2024 | 16 July 2026 | |
| Vitalii Kim | 16 July 2026 | Incumbent | |

== See also ==
- Military of Ukraine
- Annexation of Crimea by the Russian Federation
- War in Donbas
- Russo-Ukrainian War
- Humanitarian situation during the war in Donbas
