= Svitlana Fomenko =

Ukrainian civil servant and politician

- Світлана Фоменко
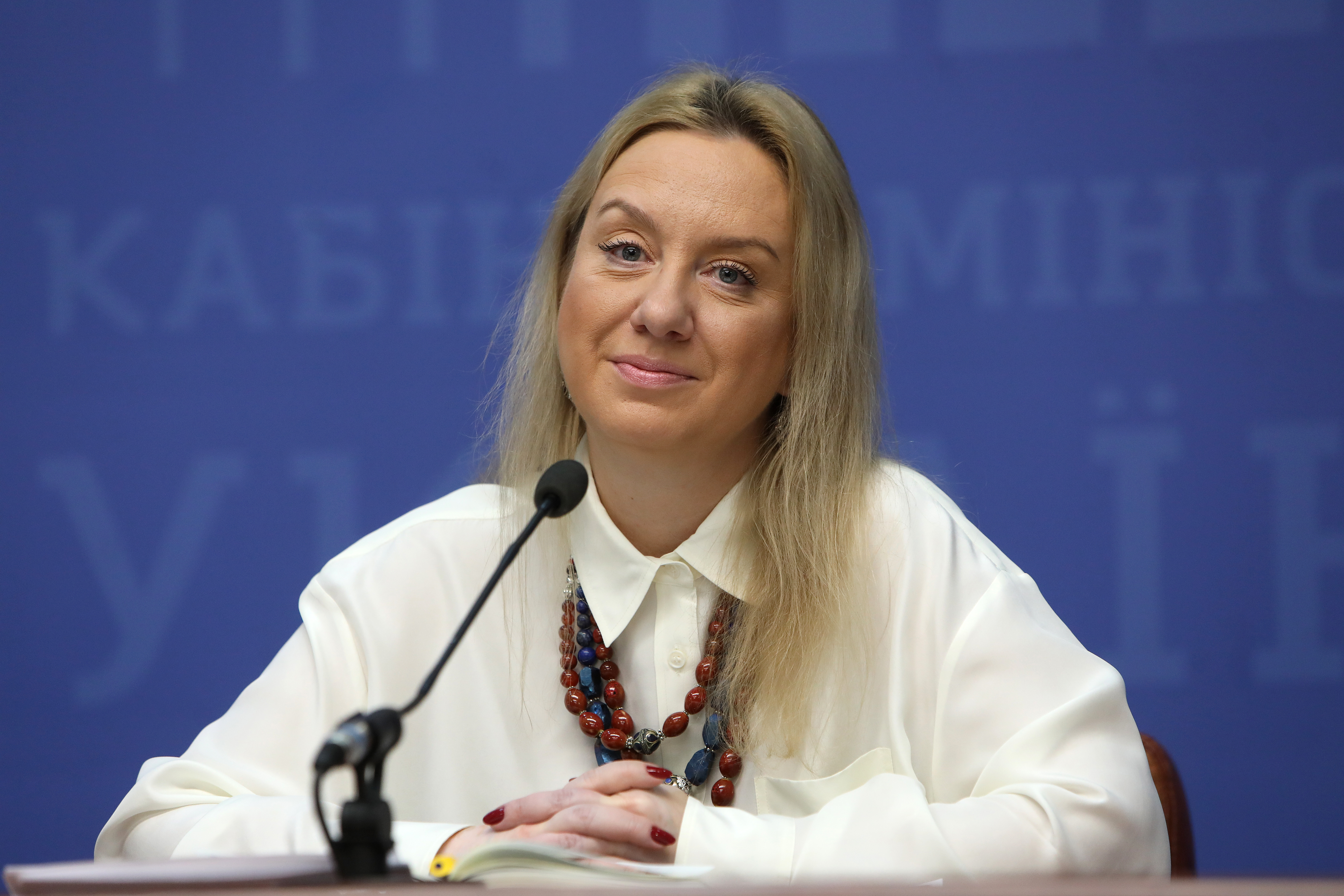

Acting Minister of Culture and Information Policy
- In office 10 March 2020 – 4 June 2020
- Prime Minister: Denys Shmyhal
- Preceded by: Volodymyr Borodiansky
- Succeeded by: Oleksandr Tkachenko

Personal details
- Born: 19 November 1976 (age 49) Kyiv, Ukrainian SSR, Soviet Union (now Ukraine)
- Party: Independent
- Education: University of Kyiv; National Academy for Public Administration under the President of Ukraine
- Occupation: civil servant politician

Svitlana Valeriyivna Fomenko (Ukrainian: Світлана Валеріївна Фоменко; born 19 November 1976) is a Ukrainian civil servant and politician. From 10 March 2020 to 4 June 2020 she was Ukraine's acting Minister of Culture and Information Policy.

== Biography ==
In 1999, she received a master's degree from the University of Kyiv. In 2011, Fomenko graduated from the National Academy for Public Administration under the President of Ukraine.

She worked in the Kyiv City Council and the Kyiv City State Administration.

Since 2013, she headed the Department of International Cooperation at the Ministry of Culture.

Fomenko is a former assistant to a People's Deputy of Ukraine.

In April 2016 Fomenko became Deputy Minister of Culture for European Integration. From 2 January 2020 to 28 March 2020, she served as deputy minister of Culture, Youth and Sports of Ukraine for European Integration.

On 10 March 2020 Fomenko was appointed acting Minister of Culture and Information Policy. On 29 March 2020 she was appointed Deputy Minister of culture and Information Policy of Ukraine for European Integration.

On 4 June 2021 Fomenko was dismissed as acting Minister of Culture and Information Policy. That day Oleksandr Tkachenko was appointed Minister of Culture and Information Policy.

On 17 September 2021 the Shmyhal Government dismissed Fomenko from the post of Deputy Minister of Culture and Information Policy for European Integration.

== See also ==
- Shmyhal Government
