= Liubchenko =

Liubchenko or Lyubchenko (Ukrainian: Любченко) is a Ukrainian surname. Notable people with the surname include:

- Igor Liubchenko (born 1991), Ukrainian Muay Thai fighter
- Oleksiy Liubchenko (born 1971), Ukrainian politician
- Panas Lyubchenko (1897–1937), Ukrainian and Soviet politician
