= Flowers of Ukraine =

- Квіти України
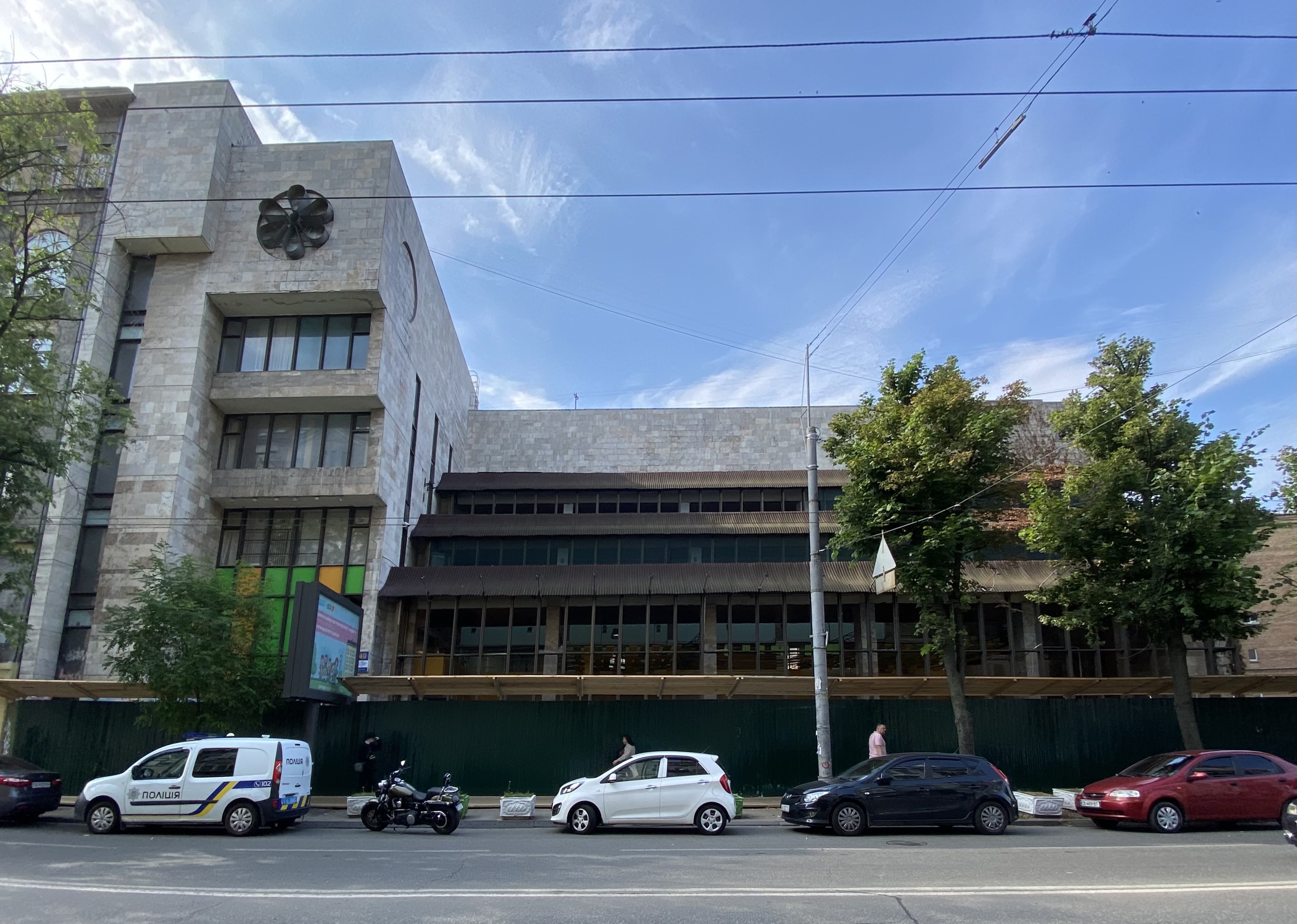
- View from the street
- Interactive map of the Flowers of Ukraine area

General information
- Status: Partially demolished
- Architectural style: Modernism
- Location: Kyiv, Ukraine, 49, Sichovyh Striltsiv Street
- Coordinates: 50°27′21″N 30°29′41″E

Design and construction
- Architect: Mykola Levchuk

Immovable Monument of Local Significance of Ukraine
- Official name: Оранжерея, навчально-методичний павільйон «Квіти України» (Greenhouse, educational and methodological pavilion "Flowers of Ukraine")
- Type: Architecture, Monumental Art
- Reference no.: 3065-Кв

Flowers of Ukraine (Ukrainian: Квіти України, romanized: Kvity Ukrainy) is a late-soviet modernist building located in Kyiv. It was built in 1983-1985 on the basis of a design by Ukrainian architect Mykola Levchuk and in 1986 it was awarded the "Building of the Year" status by the Ukrainian Union of Architects.

== Description ==
The building is five-storey high, total height (including technical floor) – 21 m. The main, northern, façade was created in the form of a cascade of three glazed forms to the height of the second, third and fourth floors.

Above the entrance hangs avant-corps with three ledges-cornices. A round window is placed above the entrance group. The center of the interior planning of the house was the atrium, surrounded by open tiers of galleries.

== History ==
The author of the project of the flower shop-greenhouse "Flowers of Ukraine" is Ukrainian architect Mykola Levchuk. The project, was chosen as a result of the competition that was announced among the architects of "Kyivproject" in 1979. After its implementation won the award of the Ukrainian Union of Architects as "Building of the Year" (1986).

From the time of commissioning (1985) until the 2000s, in addition to the largest flower shop in Kyiv, the building housed a greenhouse, an exhibition hall, a research base, rooms for cultural and educational work (floristic classes), administrative and storage facilities.

=== Planned reconstruction ===
In 2021, the owner of the building planned its reconstruction into an office center with added a superstructure and an underground car park. At the end of June 2021, the developer cut the vines that grew on the façade of the house for thirty years and began to deconstruct the interior, including the original chandeliers and stained glass.

On July 6, 2021, a protest took place near the building, at which public activists demanded the restoration of a modernist building. The organizers and participants of the rally demanded from the Ministry of Culture of Ukraine and the Department of Cultural Heritage of the Kyiv City State Administration to grant the building the protection status.

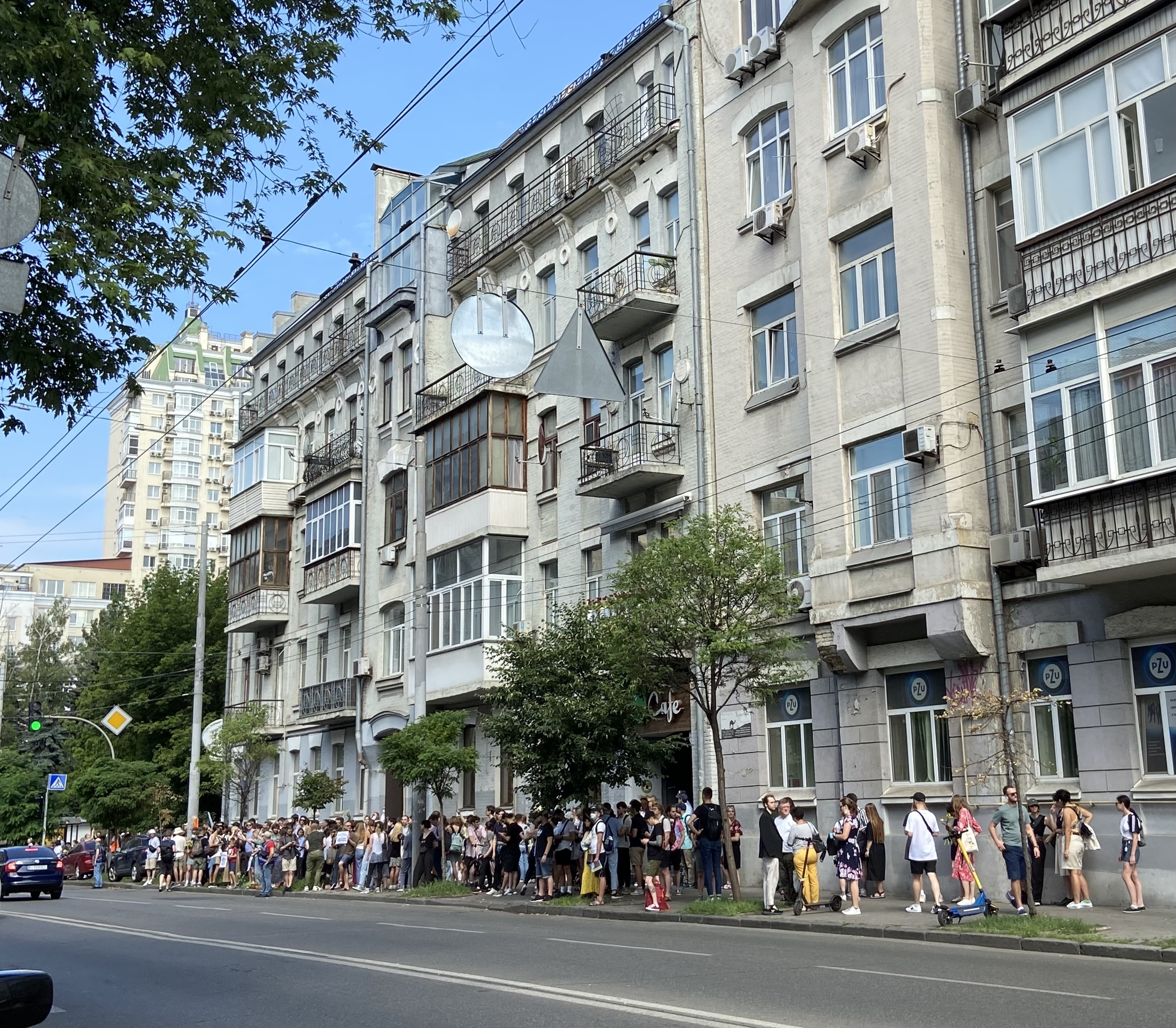
Demonstration against the reconstruction of the building on July 6, 2021

On July 12, 2021, the owner of the building began dismantling the main façade of the pavilion, in response to which activists destroyed the fence around the building and began to block construction equipment. Later on his Facebook page, the Minister of Culture of Ukraine Oleksandr Tkachenko spoke about the need to stop the dismantling of the building and to resolve the issue of granting protection status to the building, he also called on Kyiv Mayor Vitaliy Klychko to take a more careful approach regarding rules and restrictions for historic buildings. The following day, the building was confiscated by the Shevchenkivskyi District Court of Kyiv, which ruled that any construction work was prohibited during the preparatory investigation and that the building should be guarded by the police.

On July 23, 2021, the Ministry of Culture and Information Policy announced the signing of a memorandum with a number of public organizations on the preservation of cultural heritage sites of the second half of the 20th century. The memorandum also aims to establish working groups by region to monitor, identify and register cultural heritage sites.

On August 3, 2021, the Department of Cultural Heritage Protection of the Kyiv City State Administration included the Flowers of Ukraine building on the list of cultural heritage objects in Kyiv and sent applications to the Ministry of Culture and information on inclusion in the State Register of Monuments.

On December 2, 2022, at the end of its existence, the District Administrative Court of Kyiv reviewed the developer's claim in a shortened procedure canceled the order of the Ministry of Culture on the ban on construction and the decision to grant the building the status of a monument.

On October 31, 2023, the Sixth Administrative Court of Appeal satisfied the appeal of the Ministry of Culture and a number of other institutions and organizations, refused to cancel the entry of the building into the State Register of Monuments, and upheld the order of the Ministry of Culture to stop construction work.

== See more ==
- Flowers of Ukraine (2024 Polish-Ukrainian documentary film).
