= Serhiy Bessarab =

Soviet-Ukrainian lieutenant general

- Сергій Бессараб
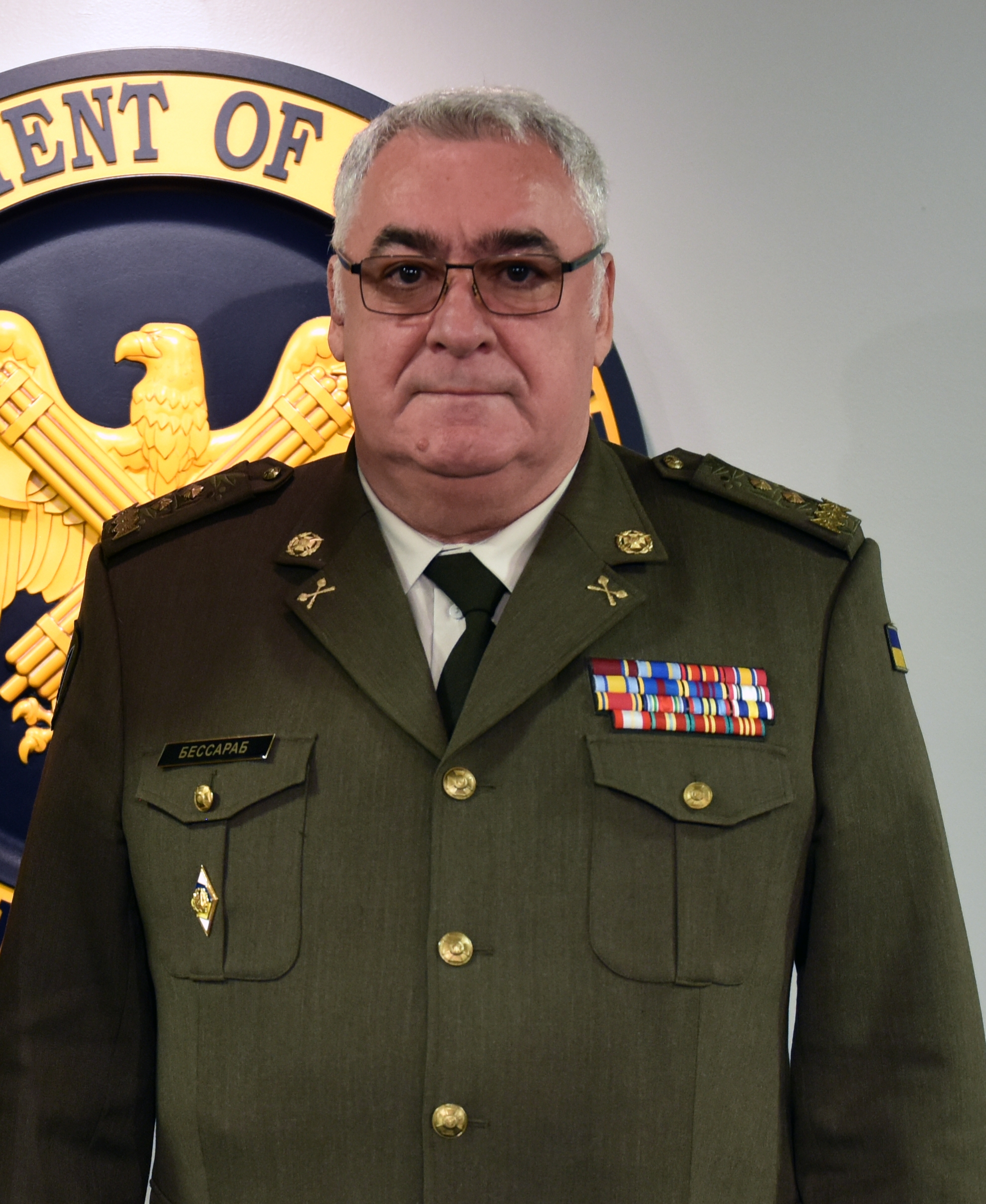
- Bessarab in 2018

Minister of Veterans Affairs
- In office 4 March 2020 – 16 December 2020
- President: Volodymyr Zelenskyy
- Prime Minister: Denys Shmyhal
- Preceded by: Position established
- Succeeded by: Yulia Laputina

Personal details
- Born: 13 November 1955 (age 70) Stari Kodaky, Ukrainian SSR, Soviet Union (now Ukraine)
- Party: Independent
- Education: Kyiv Suvorov Military School; Kyiv Higher Combined-Arms Command School; Moscow Military Academy; National Defense University of Ukraine

Serhiy Borysovych Bessarab (Ukrainian: Сергій Борисович Бессараб, IPA: [serˈɦij boˈrɪsowɪdʒ besːɐˈrɑb]; born 13 November 1955) is a Soviet and Ukrainian lieutenant general. He served as a troop commander of the Territorial Directorate "North" (2005–2007), the First Deputy Commander of the Ukrainian Ground Forces (2012–2015), and the Deputy Chief of the General Staff of the Ukrainian Armed Forces (2015–2020). On 4 March 2020, he was appointed as the Minister for Veterans Affairs of Ukraine in the Shmyhal Government. He resigned due to ill health on 16 December 2020.

== Biography ==
In 1977, Bessarab graduated from Kyiv Higher Combined-Arms Command School, and in 1990 graduated from the M. V. Frunze Military Academy in Moscow. Later, in 2002, he also graduated from National Defense University of Ukraine.

Since May 2012 - First Deputy Commander of the Land Forces of the Armed Forces of Ukraine.

Since 2015, he has been the commander of the ATO. According to volunteer Vitaliy Deynega, the new commander forbade Ukrainian soldiers in the ATO zone to respond to militants' artillery attacks with artillery fire.

From March 4 to December 15, 2020, he was the Minister of Veterans Affairs of Ukraine.
