= Yulia Svyrydenko =

Prime Minister of Ukraine from 2025 to 2026

- Юлія Свириденко
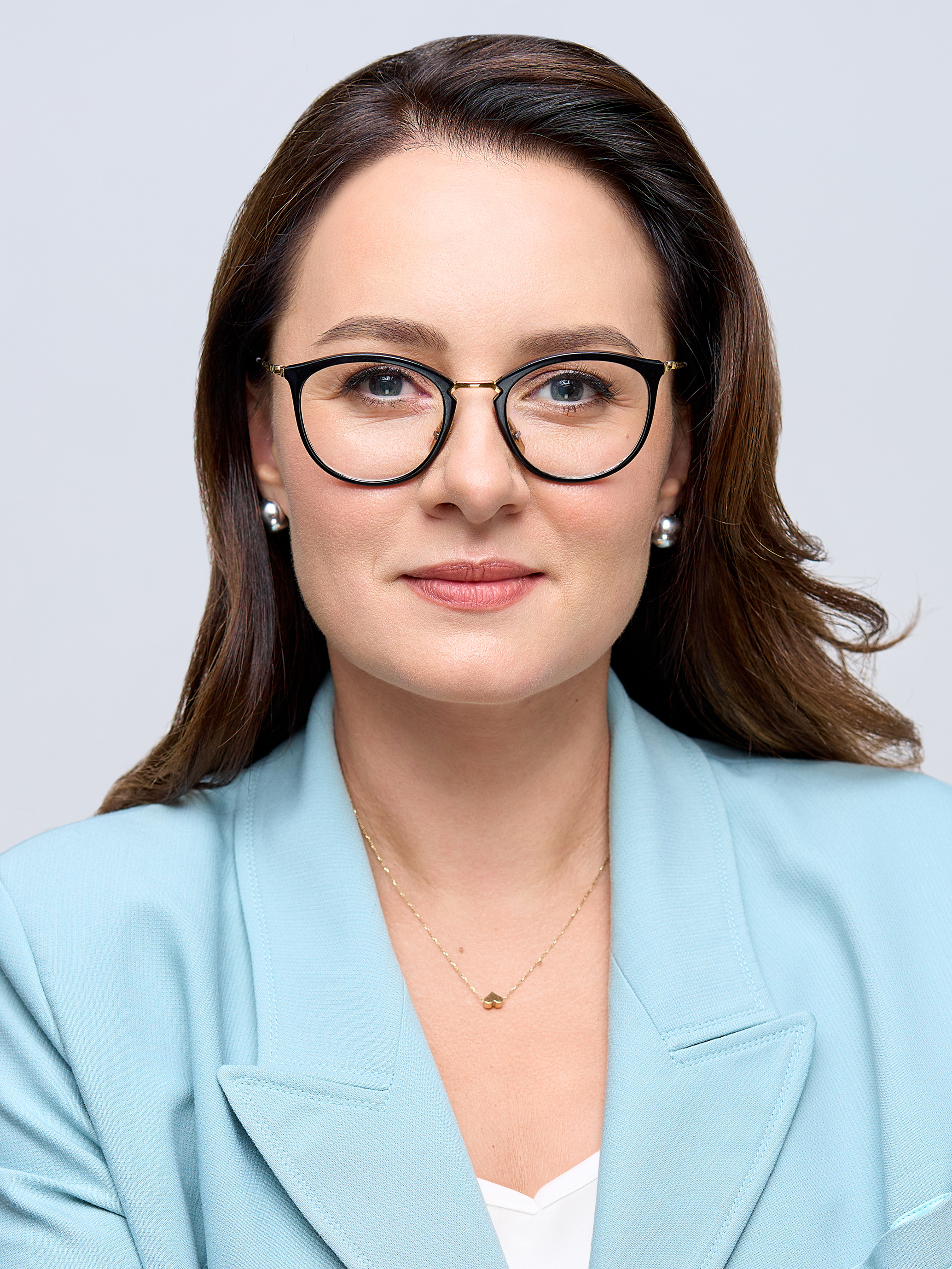
- Official portrait, 2024

19th Prime Minister of Ukraine
- In office 17 July 2025 – 16 July 2026
- President: Volodymyr Zelenskyy
- Deputy: Mykhailo Fedorov; Oleksiy Kuleba; Taras Kachka; Denys Shmyhal
- Preceded by: Denys Shmyhal
- Succeeded by: Serhii Koretskyi

25th First Deputy Prime Minister of Ukraine Minister of Economic Development and Trade
- In office 4 November 2021 – 17 July 2025
- Prime Minister: Denys Shmyhal
- Preceded by: Oleksiy Lyubchenko
- Succeeded by: Mykhailo Fedorov

Deputy Head of the Office of the President
- In office 22 December 2020 – 4 November 2021
- President: Volodymyr Zelenskyy
- Head of the Office: Andriy Yermak
- Preceded by: Yulia Kovaliv
- Succeeded by: Rostyslav Shurma

Governor of Chernihiv Oblast
- Acting; 30 July 2018 – 28 November 2018
- President: Petro Poroshenko
- Prime Minister: Volodymyr Groysman
- Preceded by: Valeriy Kulich
- Succeeded by: Oleksandr Mysnyk

Personal details
- Born: Yulia Anatoliivna Svyrydenko; 25 December 1985 (age 40) Chernihiv, Ukrainian SSR, Soviet Union (now Ukraine)
- Party: Independent
- Other political affiliations: European Solidarity
- Spouse: Serhiy Derlemenko
- Children: 1
- Education: Kyiv National University of Trade and Economics
- Occupation: Economist; politician

Yulia Anatoliivna Svyrydenko (Note: Ukrainian: Юлія Анатоліївна Свириденко, pronounced [ˈjul⁽ʲ⁾ijɐ ɐnɐˈtɔl⁽ʲ⁾ijiu̯nɐ swɪrɪˈdɛnko]) (born 25 December 1985) is a Ukrainian politician who served as the 19th prime minister of Ukraine from 2025 to 2026. Before that, she was the first deputy prime minister and Minister of Economic Development and Trade from 2021, until she replaced Denys Shmyhal as prime minister as part of a government reshuffle proposed by President Volodymyr Zelenskyy.

== Early life ==
Yulia Anatoliivna Svyrydenko was born on 25 December 1985 in Chernihiv, then part of the Soviet Union. Her father was the head of the Chernihiv territorial branch of the Antimonopoly Committee of Ukraine, and her mother worked in the office of the Chernihiv Oblast Council.

== Education ==
In 2008, Svyrydenko graduated from Kyiv National University of Trade and Economics with a degree in antimonopoly management.

== Career ==
Svyrydenko began her career in 2008 as an economist at a Ukrainian-Andorran joint venture JSC "AMP".

In 2011, Svyrydenko became a permanent representative of Chernihiv in the city of Wuxi, the only representative office of a Ukrainian city in China.

In 2015, Svyrydenko began working as the head of the Department of Economic Development of the Chernihiv Oblast. In the 2015 Ukrainian local elections she ran for the Chernihiv City Council for the party Petro Poroshenko Bloc (as an independent candidate) in one of the city's majoritarian districts, but she was not elected. Svyrydenko's husband, Serhiy Derlemenko, also ran for Chernihiv City Council in 2015. He did so for the party Self Reliance, but was also not elected.

From 30 July to 28 November 2018, she served as acting Governor (head of the regional state administration) of the Chernihiv Oblast.

On 5 May 2020, President of Ukraine Volodymyr Zelenskyy appointed Svyrydenko as the representative of Ukraine in the subgroup on social and economic issues of the Trilateral Contact Group on Ukraine.

On 22 December 2020, President Zelenskyy appointed Svyrydenko as Deputy Head of the Office of the President to replace Yuliya Kovaliv.

On 4 November 2021, the Verkhovna Rada (Ukraine's national parliament) appointed Svyrydenko as First Deputy Prime Minister and Minister of Economic Development and Trade. 256 MPs voted for her appointment.

In August 2022, the Shmyhal Government authorised Svyrydenko to head the Interagency Working Group on the Implementation of the State Sanctions Policy. She negotiated with other countries to strengthen sanctions against Russia, in particular with representatives of the United Kingdom.

== Prime Minister of Ukraine (2025–2026) ==
On 14 July 2025, President Zelenskyy announced a government reshuffle and nominated Svyrydenko as Prime Minister of Ukraine. Her appointment was approved by the Verkhovna Rada on 17 July. Svyrydenko is the second female prime minister of Ukraine since Ukrainian independence in 1991, following in Yulia Tymoshenko's footsteps.

Exactly a year after being named prime minister, Svyrydenko submitted her resignation which was accepted by the Verkhovna Rada. People's Deputy Oleksiy Honcharenko stated "No one can even explain exactly why" with Reuters suggesting it had to do with failing to clean house following a corruption scandal. Serhii Koretskyi was appointed as her successor.

== Controversy ==
In 2024, Svyrydenko reported earning UAH 3,102,506 for her work at the Kyiv School of Economics (KSE). KSE president Tymofiy Mylovanov confirmed that she receives approximately $6,000 per month for her teaching duties. Mylovanov, in turn, is a member of the supervisory board of NNEGC Energoatom, appointed by the Cabinet of Ministers when Svyrydenko was Minister of Economy. Some media and MPs (notably Volodymyr Ariev) have raised concerns about a potential conflict of interest, pointing out that KSE-affiliated structures implemented grant programmes in which the Ministry of Economy (led by Svyrydenko) was a beneficiary.

According to an investigation piece by the Ukrainian online newspaper Ukrainska Pravda published in July 2024 Svyrydenko only achieved minor achievements during her time at the Economy Ministry (including small-business grant programmes and work tied to EU "Ukraine Facility" support) and on the other hand had received major criticisms from unnamed officials about project outcomes and leadership style. The same reporting described her close working relationship with the Office of the President and the first lady (Olena Zelenska) during official travel; the article presented these as part of the political context around her prospective promotion at the time. In the same article the authors claimed that mid-2024, President Zelenskyy repeatedly discussed with Svyrydenko the possibility of her succeeding Denys Shmyhal as prime minister. The outlet reported mixed views within the governing camp about her readiness to lead the cabinet, noting both supporters who emphasised her proximity to the president's office and critics who questioned whether she could command the entire system.

== Family and personal life ==
Svyrydenko is married to Serhiy Derlemenko (born in 1979). The couple has one daughter.

According to Ukrainian biographies, Svyrydenko speaks English, Russian, Chinese, and Japanese. Her hobby is playing piano.

== Awards ==
Then-US secretary of commerce Gina Raimondo included Svyrydenko's profile in Time magazine's TIME100 Next, where she was described as "emblematic of the Ukrainian people's resilience" (referring to the Russian invasion of Ukraine).

== See also ==
- Svyrydenko Government

== Notes ==
Political offices
Preceded by Denys Shmyhal	Prime Minister of Ukraine; 2025–2026	Succeeded by Serhii Koretskyi
