= Oleksiy Honcharuk =

Prime Minister of Ukraine from 2019 to 2020

- Олексій Гончарук
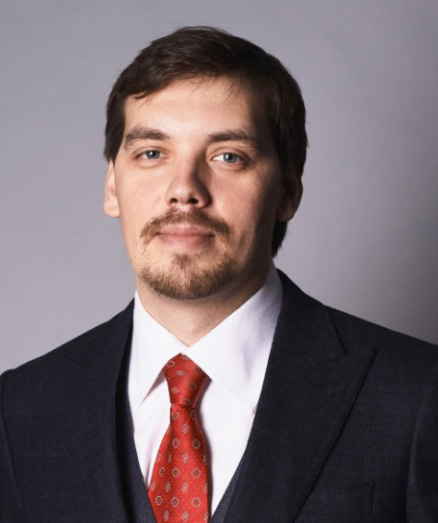

17th Prime Minister of Ukraine
- In office 29 August 2019 – 4 March 2020
- President: Volodymyr Zelenskyy
- Preceded by: Volodymyr Groysman
- Succeeded by: Denys Shmyhal

Personal details
- Born: 7 July 1984 (age 42) Zhmerynka, Ukrainian SSR, Soviet Union (now Ukraine)
- Party: Servant of the People (2019-present)
- Other political affiliations: Power of the People (2014–2018); People are Important (2018–2019)
- Education: Interregional Academy of Personnel Management; National Academy for Public Administration; Kyiv Mohyla Business School; Aspen Institute
- Profession: lawyer

Oleksiy Valeriyovych Honcharuk (Note: Ukrainian: Олексі́й Вале́рійович Гончару́к, pronounced [olekˈs⁽ʲ⁾ij wɐˈlɛr⁽ʲ⁾ijowɪdʒ‿ɦontʃɐˈruk]) (born 7 July 1984) is a Ukrainian politician. He served as the Prime Minister of Ukraine from 29 August 2019 to 4 March 2020 following a landslide parliamentary election win. Honcharuk was replaced by Denys Shmyhal during the formation of the Shmyhal Government.

Before this appointment, Honcharuk was a lawyer and the deputy head of the Office of the President of Ukraine, led by Volodymyr Zelenskyy. He was also a member of the Servant of the People. Being 35 years old at the time of appointment, he is the youngest Prime Minister in Ukrainian history.

== Early life and career ==
=== Family ===
Oleksiy Valeriyovych Honcharuk was born on 7 July 1984 in Zhmerynka, Vinnytsia Oblast, in what was then the Ukrainian Soviet Socialist Republic of the Soviet Union. Other sources have claimed that he was born in Horodnia, Chernihiv Oblast, where he finished school.

Honcharuk's father Valeriy was a politician, and part of the Social Democratic Party of Ukraine (united). He died in an accident in 2003. Honcharuk later told journalists that his father's death was the motivating factor for his decision to reform emergency medical services as prime minister.

Oleksiy's mother, Tetiana, is a doctor. When Oleksiy was 16 years old, she immigrated to Italy and lives there until now. During the COVID-19 pandemic, Tetiana served in a hospital near Milan.

Oleksiy Honcharuk also has a younger brother.

=== Education ===
Honcharuk was a student of the Interregional Academy of Personnel Management from 2001 to 2006, graduating with a law master's degree. Later, he obtained a degree at the National Academy for Public Administration. He also graduated from the Aspen Institute in Kyiv and Kyiv-Mohyla Business School.

=== Career ===
From 2005, Honcharuk worked as a lawyer and head of law departments of various companies.

Honcharuk has had more than ten years of legal practice. He has worked as a lawyer in the PRIOR-Invest investment company, and later headed its legal department. In 2008 Oleksiy Honcharuk established law firm Constructive Lawyers, which provides legal services in the field of investment and financing real estate construction.

Honcharuk's last position as a lawyer was being a lead partner at a company that specializes in real estate development. In 2009, Honcharuk became Chairman of the Association for Assistance to Affected Investors and the Union of Investors of Ukraine, two non-government organisations centred around investment.

== Early political career ==
In the 2014 Ukrainian parliamentary election, Honcharuk unsuccessfully sought a parliamentary seat for the Power of the People party, and was placed first on the party's electoral list. Following the election, he became an adviser to ecology minister Ihor Shevchenko and First Vice Premier Stepan Kubiv. In 2015, Economic Minister Aivaras Abromavičius, with the financial support of Canada and the European Union, created an office of the BRDO think tank dealing with the simplification of state regulations in the relations between the state and business. The competition for the leader of BRDO was won by Honcharuk.

Under the leadership of Honcharuk, BRDO primarily sought the deregulation of business, and successfully pursued the abolition of around 1,000 illegal and irrelevant acts, as well as approving more than 50 decisions in favour of business. The reform of regulatory bodies was initiated, including a transition to a risk-oriented approach. Apart from that, there were developed a number of progressive on-line products including the portal of step-by-step instructions for starting your own business, an inspection portal for monitoring the use of funds, and a number of other initiatives.

In April 2016, Honcharuk once again met Kubiv, who invited him to become his advisor pro bono as Deputy Prime Minister for Economic Development.

At the end of 2018, Honcharuk co-created the liberal conservative People are Important non-government organisation, which was intended to grow into a political party. However, the party was not deemed ready enough to take part in the snap July 2019 Ukrainian parliamentary election.

=== Joining the presidential administration ===
On 28 May 2019, Honcharuk was appointed Deputy Head of the Office of the President of Ukraine. In this position, he was responsible for the block of economic development and continuation of reforms. As a member of the presidential administration, Honcharuk was a member of the National Council of Reforms, and also served as a member of the National Investment Council of Ukraine from June 2019 and a member of the National Council on Anti-corruption policies.

During his work in the President's Office, Honcharuk was responsible for the implementation of reforms aimed at simplifying business conditions, improving the investment climate, opening up the land market, and a number of other economic reforms. This led to the signing of a number of decrees during his tenure.

Among the most critical decrees during Honcharuk's time in the presidential administration were those counteracting illegal takeover and smuggling and those promoting the introduction of new approaches in infrastructure. In particular, Honcharuk sought increased construction and repairing of roads, as well as increasing internet access throughout the country. The minimum payment for notary services has also been abolished simplifying their work and allowing notaries to pay less than 1% of real estate value.

One of the most striking and important decrees was abolition of five-fold fine for violation of cashier discipline.

Upon initiative of Honcharuk a full revision of presidential decrees was carried out, so that 160 of obsolete decrees which prevented businesses from working and created additional bureaucratic barriers were abolished.

According to Ukrayinska Pravda, in the spring of 2019, Monobank co-founder Dmytro Dubilet introduced Honcharuk to Andriy Bohdan as the one "who brought him to Bankova". First aide to President Volodymyr Zelenskyy Serhii Shefir confirmed that Bohdan was responsible for the appointment of Honcharuk in the presidential administration. Dubilet and Zelenskyy's campaign staff denied this and claim they met Honcharuk in 2018 in his capacity as chairman.

== Prime Minister of Ukraine ==
On 27 August, international media reported that Zelenskyy would propose that the Verkhovna Rada appoint Honcharuk to the post of Prime Minister of Ukraine. On 29 August, he was officially nominated for the post of prime minister and the same day the Verkhovna Rada easily approved Honcharuk with 290 deputies voting in favour of his appointment. On 29 August 2019, the Verkhovna Rada of Ukraine appointed Honcharuk as Prime Minister of Ukraine.

The Honcharuk Government included several experts - including Honcharuk himself - who grew and gained credibility in European-funded programs. International analysts welcomed the appointment of Oleksiy Honcharuk. Impressions of the foreign press on Honcharuk's appointment were extremely positive. The Western press drew attention to the prime minister's young age, his "workaholism" and promises to achieve sharp GDP growth.

Honcharuk is the youngest-ever Prime Minister of Ukraine, aged 35 at the time of his appointment. Before him, the youngest one was Volodymyr Groysman, who took the post at 38 and was himself succeeded by Honcharuk. Honcharuk only had three months of government experience before becoming prime minister.

High Representative for Foreign Affairs and Security Policy of the European Union Josep Borrell admitted at the annual EU-Ukraine summit in Brussels that the Honcharuk government's reform agenda had been ambitious and had made significant progress in five months.

=== Privatisation ===
In September 2019, the Government of Honcharuk presented its Action Program to the Verkhovna Rada, which was approved by the Verkhovna Rada on 4 October 2019. According to the media, this was the first Government's Program of Action, where ministers had clear indicators with specific KPI's and dates of their implementation.

Honcharuk proposed a fundamental reconstruction of the State Geocadastre of Ukraine, in the process removing 20 of the service's 24 oblast-level heads. The three goals pushed by Honcharuk were the creation of a digital map of Ukrainian geography and resources, a catalogue of all land in the preparation of opening the land market, and ensuring transparency by publishing all decisions of the State Geocadastre and its regional subdivisions online. These efforts sought to prepare the country for an opening of the land market, and allowed the Verkhovna Rada to adopt a historic land reform bill on 31 March 2020.

Under Honcharuk's leadership, the government launched the largest-scale privatisation process since independence. Government moved more than 1,000 unprofitable state-owned enterprises to the State Property Fund — ten times more than in the previous ten years. That allowed the State Property Fund to sell the first large object at the auction, the Dnipro Hotel in the centre of Kyiv, for a record ₴1.1 billion in July 2020.

Honcharuk's government was also the first in the history of Ukraine to unbundle Naftogaz - a 4-month process. This decision allowed a new contract for gas transportation between Ukraine, the European Union, and Russia in December 2019. Thanks to the work of Honcharuk's government, the contract with Russia for gas transportation was signed on favourable terms for Ukraine.

For the first time since Ukraine's independence, the government launched a public-private partnership mechanism and conducted the concessions of the Olvia and Kherson seaports, as well as preparing the concession of 12 other facilities.

=== Economics ===
In October 2019, the Government of Oleksiy Honcharuk and the National Bank, headed by Yakov Smoliy, signed a memorandum of understanding to achieve sustainable economic growth and price stability.

This memorandum between the government and the National Bank allowed Ukraine in January 2020 to place Eurobonds at the cheapest interest rates in Ukrainian history. Ukraine issued new 10-year Eurobonds in euros with an interest rate of 4.375% per annum. The funds raised would be used to finance the state budget. As a result, Ukraine attracted 1.25 billion euros.

To support and develop small businesses, together with leading state-owned banks, Honcharuk's government launched a program of cheap loans for small and micro-businesses.

Citing his father's 2003 death in a car accident, Honcharuk invested heavily into the emergency medical services of Ukraine. ₴6 billion in the 2020 budget were set aside, with the aim of providing adequate equipment to 200 emergency departments throughout Ukraine.

=== Anti-corruption ===
Honcharuk's government had zero tolerance for corruption. In October 2019, the Government began a complete reset of the National Agency on Corruption Prevention. In January 2020, the government appointed Oleksandr Novikov as the new head of the agency.

The government replaced managers at most state-owned enterprises who had been associated with the corruption scandals, and, together with the Ministry of Justice, the government launched the Anti-Raid Office, which responds to attacks on business within 24 hours.

Working in tandem with law enforcement authorities and the State Fiscal Service, the government started fighting grey markets —they closed more than 500 illegal gas stations and illegal gambling establishments in the regions. In just one day, thanks to law enforcement officers across Ukraine, more than 5,500 illegal gambling establishments were closed.

=== Resignation ===
In January 2020, after leaked recordings emerging on the internet in which a man with a voice similar to Honcharuk's criticised Zelenskyy's knowledge of economics, as well as his own knowledge of the subject and competence, Honcharuk submitted a letter of resignation to the President of Ukraine. Zelenskyy, who could not dismiss Honcharuk without the assent of the Verkhovna Rada, refused to accept the resignation, saying, "Now is not the time to undermine the state, economically or politically". Nevertheless, in March 2020, Zelenskyy proposed sweeping changes to the government, including the appointment of a new prime minister.

On 4 March 2020, the Honcharuk Government was replaced by the Shmyhal Government.

== After resignation ==
In the first interview after his resignation, he stated that he would remain involved in politics and will continue to promote the continuance and implementation of reforms.

On 31 August 2020, the Atlantic Council's Eurasia Centre announced that Honcharuk would be joining them as a distinguished fellow. In September 2020, Honcharuk left for the United States, claiming he sought to improve American policy on Ukraine and Ukraine–United States relations.

In 2021, Honcharuk began working as a Bernard and Susan Liautaud Visiting Fellow at FSI Stanford University.

Two months before Russia’s full-scale invasion, he returned to Ukraine.

Following the invasion, he became Chair of the Supervisory Board of the NGO Aerorozvidka, where he oversaw the deployment of the DELTA IT system and a nationwide network of situational centres. These efforts formed the foundation for the implementation of ISTAR situational awareness capabilities within the Armed Forces of Ukraine.

In his role as adviser to Ukraine’s Minister of Digital Transformation, Mykhailo Fedorov, he led the development and rollout of the Drone ID drone identification system.

In 2024–2025, he was an adviser to the Commander of Ukraine’s Unmanned Systems Forces.

Since December 2025, Honcharuk has served as a Visiting Fellow at the London School of Economics. Commenting on the appointment, he noted: “The work is remote, of course. While the war continues, my focus is 110% on Ukraine.”

“LSE IDEAS is delighted to host Oleksiy Honcharuk as a Visiting Fellow, and we are confident he will make a significant contribution to our understanding and work on Ukraine,” said Chris Alden, Director of LSE IDEAS.

Within his collaboration with LSE, Honcharuk is developing the concept of a new battlefield domain — the Time Domain — which emerged from his analysis of drone warfare during Ukraine’s defence. Since December 2025, he has also served as Chair of the Expert Council of the 412th Unmanned Systems Brigade Nemesis.

== Controversy ==
On 17 October 2019, Honcharuk (alongside minister Oksana Koliada, who would upload concert photos to her Facebook page) attended a concert headlined by the openly neo-Nazi and Holocaust denialist band Sokyra Peruna. The event, at which he spoke on stage, was arranged by notorious far-right figure Andriy Medvedko, who chairs an organisation for veterans of the war in Donbas linked to the S14 group and is a suspect in the murder of journalist Oles Buzina. Honcharuk addressed his critics by accusing them of inappropriately politicising the situation by highlighting the Neo-Nazi character of the band, declaring that "it is not up to the government to dictate what its defenders should sing", and further justified his presence at the event by claiming there were "many bands" at the concert (there were a total of three). He denied being a fan of Sokyra Peruna and stated that he had attended the event following an invitation from a veterans' group.

In October 2019, Honcharuk admitted that he holds an "unofficial" diploma of a law degree.

On 15 January 2020, an audio recording of a conversation allegedly between Honcharuk, Deputy Head of the NBU Kateryna Rozhkova and Finance Minister Oksana Markarova was leaked on the Internet. Officials discussed the explanation of the strengthening of the hryvnia per President Zelenskyy, and Honcharuk stated that "Zelenskyy has a very primitive understanding of economic processes", and also admitted that Zelenskyy himself is "profane in economics". This incident prompted Servant of the People party to discuss the possible resignation of the government within the party. Later, information appeared that Honcharuk's recordings were allegedly being tampered with by the investigative journalists of the 1+1 channel.

== Income ==
In 2019, he declared a salary of ₴315,369, revenues from entrepreneurship of ₴315,369, cash of ₴100,000, US$31,000, €10,000, a 2007 Jaguar X-Type, and a 2004 Toyota Land Cruiser.

== Notes ==
Political offices
Preceded by Volodymyr Groysman	Prime Minister of Ukraine; 2019–2020	Succeeded by Denys Shmyhal
