= Oleksandr Tkachenko (journalist) =

Ukrainian journalist, entrepreneur, and politician

- Олександр Ткаченко
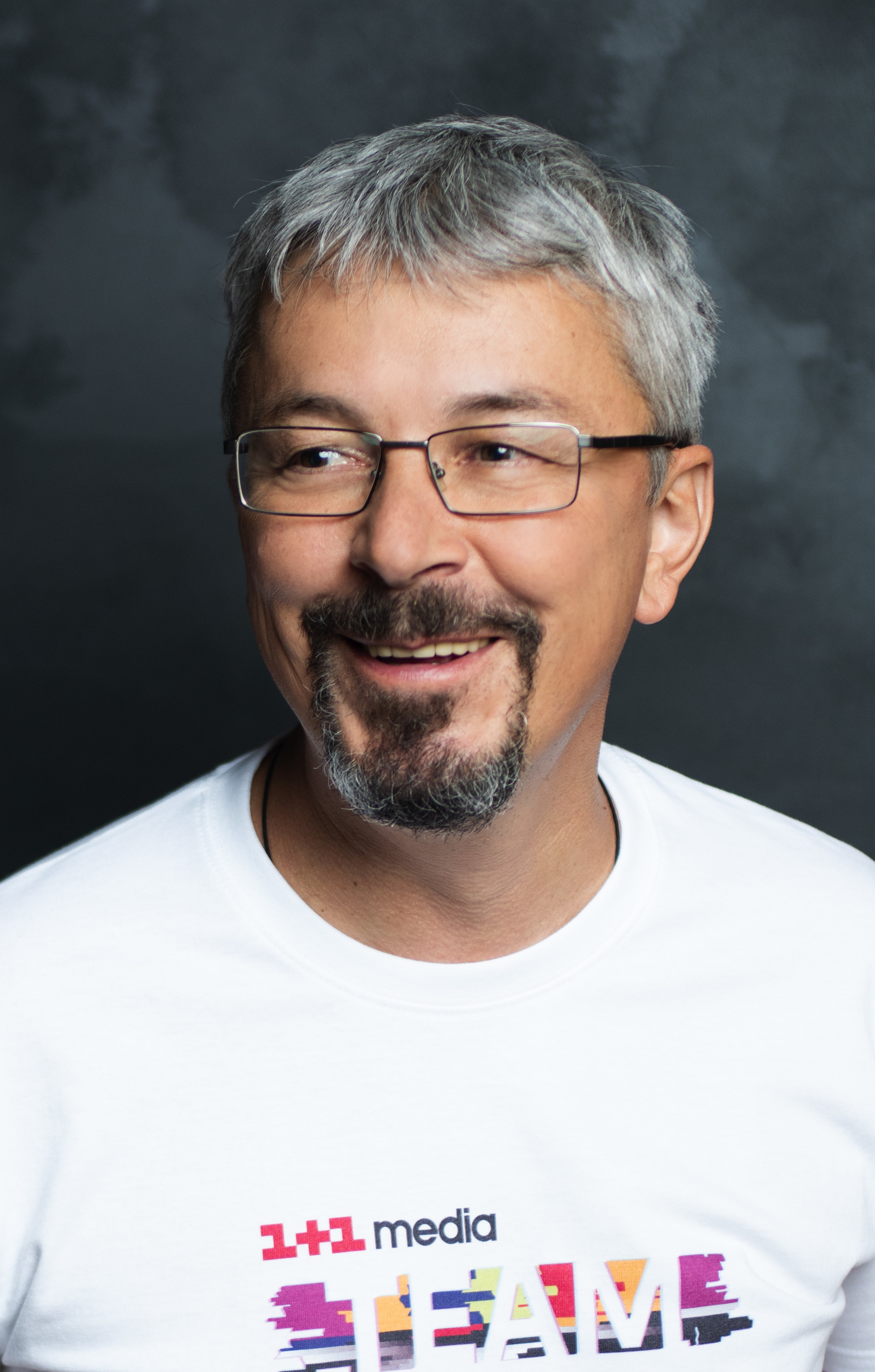
- Tkachenko in 2019

Minister of Culture and Information Policy
- In office 4 June 2020 – 27 July 2023
- President: Volodymyr Zelenskyy
- Prime Minister: Denys Shmyhal
- Preceded by: Svitlana Fomenko
- Succeeded by: Rostyslav Karandieiev (acting)

Personal details
- Born: 22 January 1966 (age 60) Kyiv, Ukrainian SSR, Soviet Union (now Ukraine)
- Education: Taras Shevchenko National University of Kyiv
- Occupation: Media producer journalist

Oleksandr Vladyslavovych Tkachenko (Ukrainian: Олекса́ндр Владисла́вович Ткаче́нко; born 22 January 1966) is a Ukrainian journalist, CEO, and politician. He served as Ukraine's Minister of Culture and Information Policy from 4 June 2020 to 27 July 2023. Prior to his Ministership, Tkachenko was a Ukrainian media manager, journalist, producer and the long-term CEO of the 1+1 Media Group.

Tkachenko won a parliamentary seat in the July 2019 Ukrainian parliamentary election with the party Servant of the People.

== Education ==
Tkachenko attended the Taras Shevchenko National University of Kyiv, where he graduated with a degree in journalism in 1990.

In 2016, he received a diploma in Business of Entertainment, Media, and Sports program.from Harvard Business School.

In 2018, he completed a study at INSEAD Business School in Singapore according to the program “Value Creation for Owners and Directors”.

== Management activities in the media ==
From 1994 to 1999, he was the president of Nova Mova Television Company (production studio), which produced the TV programs “Epilogue” and “Faces of the World” for UT-1 and Inter TV channels.

In December 1996, he, together with the whole team of “Epilogue”, moved to a new television and radio company, “Studio 1+1”. The Television News Service (TSN), created by Tkachenko, was broadcast on January 1, 1997, with presenter Alla Mazur. At the same time, the “Epilogue” continued to appear on the 1+1 TV Channel, and Tkachenko became deputy general producer of the channel.

In December 1997, he left the 1+1 TV Channel.

In April 1999, he headed Novyi Kanal TV Channel, where he came by order of the then owner of the Russian Alfa-Bank. Tkachenko reformatted and made competitive Reporter News Program, inviting some members of “Epilogue” team to it: Andriy Shevchenko, Ivanna Naida, Ihor Kulias.

From January 2000 to May 2001, he was an advisor to the Prime Minister of Ukraine Viktor Yushchenko (on a voluntary basis). In 2003, he became the informal head of the so-called Pinchuk Holding (Novyi Kanal, ICTV, STB). In August 2004, he retired from the responsibility of the holding head, and in January 2005, he left Novyi Kanal TV Channel.

In 2005, he became the chairman of the management board and one of the shareholders of Odesa Film Studio. He began to develop a chain of cinemas and cinema distribution.

From March to May 2008, he worked in Moscow as the Deputy General Director of REN TV under a consulting agreement. He was engaged in content programming and TV viewing grid.

Since August 2008, he has held a position of General Director of 1+1 Media Group, which includes such channels as: 1+1, 2+2, TET, PlusPlus, Curler, Unian-TV, 1+1 International and Ukraine Today, sales house Pluses and 1+1 company for the production of TV content.

In April 2014, against the background of annexation of Crimea to Russia and the armed conflict in the east of Ukraine, he called the Ukrainian TV channels to abandon the broadcast of Russian TV serials about security forces. Later, he supported a bill banning Russian films and TV serials promoted by armed and law enforcement forces.

On 1 November 2018, Russian sanctions were imposed against 322 citizens of Ukraine, including Oleksandr Tkachenko.

On 20 August 2019 he went out of business and resigned as CEO of the 1+1 holding.

== Producer activity ==
He was a producer of “Song of Songs”, “House with a Tower”, “Vysotsky. Thank You For Being Alive”, “At the River”.

Moreover, he was the producer of many TV serials, including “Milkmaid from Hatsapetovka”, “Tomorrow Will Be Tomorrow”, “Hope as a Confirmation of Life”, “Polka Dot Heaven” and many others.

== Journalistic activities ==
1988‒1991 — editor and presenter of the weekly television program “Youth Studio “Hart” on UT-1 Channel, the Ukrainian state television channel.

1991‒1994 — correspondent of the Ukrainian representative office of Reuters British News Agency in Kyiv.

1994 — he created the weekly informational and analytical television program “Epilogue” and became its presenter.

In 1998‒1999, based on “Nova Mova” TC at the request of Inter TV Channel, he created the author's TV program in the format of interviews with international celebrities called “Faces of the World” for one television season. The guests of the “Faces” were Dalai Lama, Pinochet, Jean Chretien, Jacques Chirac and others.

During the presidential elections of 2004, he conducted a televised debate between Viktor Yushchenko and Viktor Yanukovych.

Since 23 May 2011 he has been broadcasting the TV show “Tkachenko.UA” on 1+1 Channel for several years running.

== Participation in the media market reformation ==
Since 2005, together with his ex-colleague Andrii Shevchenko, he became one of the activists of the creation of Public Television and Radio Broadcasting in Ukraine and one of the authors of the concept of creating Public Television (Public Broadcasting).

== Political career ==
Tkachenko took part in the July 2019 Ukrainian parliamentary election with the party Servant of the People. He was elected to parliament under number 9 in election list of this party. (The party won 254 seats in the election.) On 29 August 2019, Tkachenko became Head of the Committee of the Verkhovna Rada (Ukraine's national parliament) on Humanitarian and Information Policy. He was also Head of the Group for Interparliamentary Relations with Norway.

On 4 June 2020, parliament appointed Tkachenko Minister of Culture and Information Policy of Ukraine.

On 11 November 2021, Tkachenko handed over a resignation letter due to his disagreement with the decision of the Shmyhal Government to separate the Ukrainian State Film Agency from his Ministry of Culture and other (cultural) budget cuts. On 29 November, Servant of the People faction leader Davyd Arakhamia claimed that the resignation of Tkachenko was avoided after a talk between Tkachenko and Prime Minister Denys Shmyhal; Tkachenko denied this and claimed he expected his resignation would be brought to parliament.

In response to the destruction of the Ivankiv Historical and Local History Museum during the Battle of Ivankiv on 27 February 2022 and the loss of its collection of works by Maria Prymachenko, Tkachenko requested that Russia be deprived of its UNESCO membership.

In the summer of 2023 the amount of money spent on Ukrainian culture from the state budget came under public scrutiny and criticism. The cultural ministry claimed that part of the spending was "a matter of state information and cultural security." On 20 July 2023 President Volodymyr Zelenskyy stated that he had proposed that Prime Minister Shmyhal would dismiss Tkachenko and he also criticised the spending of state budget funds for cultural projects during wartime. The following day Tkachenko announced that he had resigned. On 27 July 2023 parliament dismissed Tkachenko, 321 MPs voted in favour of his resignation.

== Private life ==
Family

Children: daughters Oleksandra (1989) and Eva (2012), son Danylo (2015).

Wife – Tkachenko Anna, former Head of 1+1 Digital and Innovations, from January 2021 - head of the digital department of "Kyiv.live" and "Odesa.live" TV channels.

In 1989-2009 he was married to Tetyana Gnedash, Ukrainian screenwriter and Art Forms Production's producer.

== Awards and achievements ==
In 2010, 2011, 2012, Tkachenko was among the TOP-200 of the most influential Ukrainians according to Focus Magazine rating. In 2015, 2016, 2017, 2018, he was among the TOP-100 of the most influential Ukrainians according to Focus Magazine rating.

== See also ==
- List of members of the parliament of Ukraine, 2019–24
