= Ministry of National Unity of Ukraine =

Government ministry of Ukraine

- Ukrainian: Міністерство національної єдності України
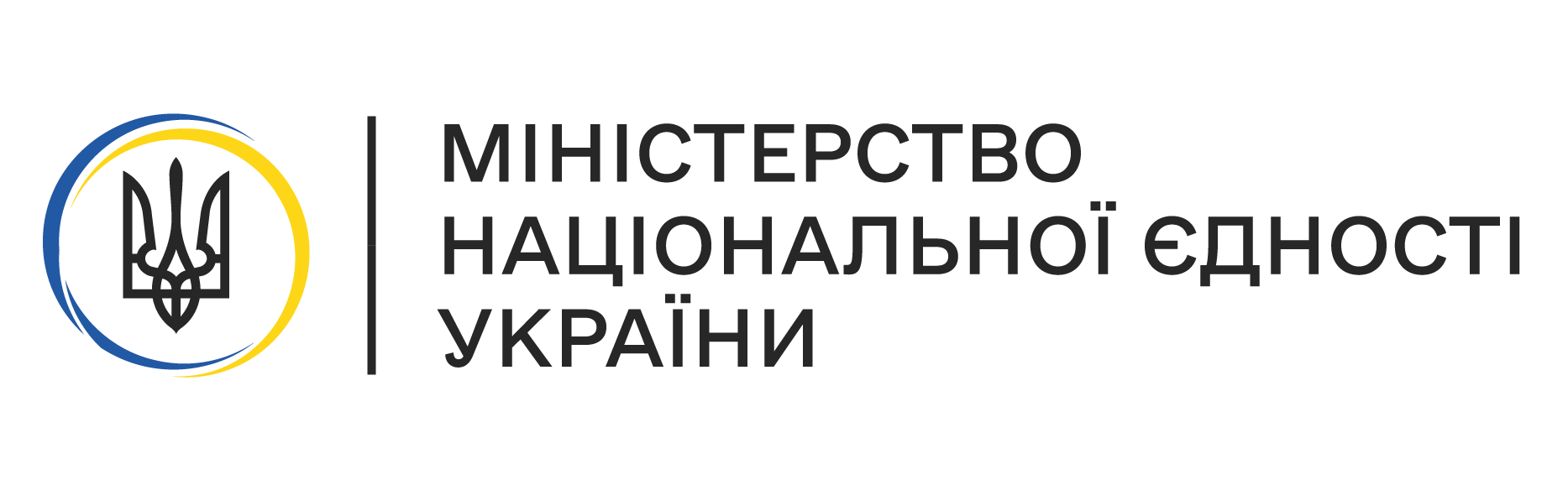

Department overview
- Formed: 20 April 2016
- Dissolved: 16 July 2025
- Jurisdiction: Government of Ukraine
- Headquarters: Kyiv, Ukraine
- Minister responsible: Oleksiy Chernyshov
- Website: unity.gov.ua

The Ministry of National Unity of Ukraine (Ukrainian: Міністерство національної єдності України, romanized: Ministerstvo nasionalnoi ednosti Ukrayiny) was a government ministry in Ukraine from April 2016 to July 2025.

Created in 2016 as the Ministry of Temporarily Occupied Territories and IDPs (Ukrainian: Міністерство з питань тимчасово окупованих територій та внутрішньо переміщених осіб України, romanized: Ministerstvo z pytan tymchasovo okupovanykh terytorii ta vnutrishno peremishchenykh osib Ukrainy) it was established to manage occupied parts of Donetsk, Luhansk, and Crimea regions affected by the Russian military intervention of 2014. After the 2022 Russian invasion of Ukraine, the Ministry also managed the newly-occupied territories across Ukraine, especially Kherson and Zaporizhzhia which were annexed by Russia along with Donetsk and Luhansk.

The Honcharuk Government in August 2019 merged the Ministry for Veterans Affairs into the ministry. But its succeeding Shmyhal Government reversed this merger in March 2020. On 16 July 2025 the ministry was merged with the Ministry of Social Policy of Ukraine.

== History ==
=== Ministry of Temporarily Occupied Territories and Internally Displaced Persons ===
Logo of the Ministry of Temporarily Occupied Territories and Displaced Persons

On 20 April 2016 the ministry was created by merging the State Agency for restoration of Donbas (formerly part of Ministry of Regional Development) and the State Service for Russian annexed Crimea and Sevastopol (formerly under direct administration of the Cabinet of Ukraine). Vadym Chernysh was on 14 April 2016 appointed as the first Minister of Temporarily Occupied Territories and IDPs in the Groysman government. Chernysh is the former head of the State Agency for restoration of Donbas.

The ministry was established in order to "search for solutions and reintegration strategies" for Ukraine to regain control Crimea and parts of (the historical region) Donbas. Ukraine lost control over Crimea, which was unilaterally annexed by Russia in March 2014. (Note: The status of the Crimea and of the city of Sevastopol is currently under dispute between Russia and Ukraine; Ukraine and the majority of the international community consider the Crimea to be an autonomous republic of Ukraine and Sevastopol to be one of Ukraine's cities with special status, while Russia, on the other hand, considers the Crimea to be a federal subject of Russia and Sevastopol to be one of Russia's three federal cities.) In the Donbas region of eastern Ukraine, pro-Russian protests escalated into an armed separatist insurgency early in April 2014, when masked gunmen took control of several of the region's government buildings and towns. This led to the creation of the self-proclaimed Donetsk People's Republic and Luhansk People's Republic. Violence between the Ukrainian army and the forces of the two breakaway republics escalated into an armed conflict. This war in Donbas led to 1.6 million people becoming internally displaced persons, according to the 2016 registry of the Ukrainian government. The Office of the United Nations High Commissioner for Human Rights reported in March 2016 that 800,000 to 1 million of them lived within Ukrainian government controlled Ukraine. This part of the Russo-Ukrainian War continued until subsumed by the Russian invasion of Ukraine in 2022.

The Honcharuk Government (on 29 August 2019) merged the Ministry for Veterans Affairs into the ministry degrading the first to an agency as it previously existed. On 23 January 2020 then Minister Oksana Koliada stated that the Ministry would likely be split up again into a separate Ministry for Veterans Affairs with the Ministry of Temporarily Occupied Territories and IDPs to be renamed "Ministry of Reintegration". Indeed, on 4 March 2020 the new Shmyhal Government undid the merge of the two ministries. It also renamed the ministry to Ministry of Reintegration of the Temporarily Occupied Territories (Ukrainian: Міністерство з питань реінтеграції тимчасово окупованих територій України, romanized: Ministerstvo z pytanʹ reintehratsiyi tymchasovo okupovanykh terytoriy Ukrayiny).

=== Ministry of National Unity of Ukraine ===
On 19 November 2024 President Volodymyr Zelenskyy announced the creation of a new (to be formed) ministry, that he then named Ministry of Unification of Ukrainians. Zelenskyy claimed this new ministry was necessary for the "institutional strengthening of the policy towards Ukrainians abroad, towards our people from all waves of migration."

On 3 December 2024 the government decided to rename the Ministry of Reintegration of the Temporarily Occupied Territories to its new name: the Ministry of National Unity of Ukraine. According to Prime Minister Denys Shmyhal this renamed ministry would conduct the task of the ministry that President Zelenskyy spoke of on 19 November 2024. Early December 2024 the Ukrainian diaspora organizations European Congress of Ukrainians and Ukrainian World Congress had not been informed about the creation of this ministry that was aimed to facilitate them.

On 16 July 2025 the ministry was merged with the Ministry of Social Policy of Ukraine.

== List of ministers ==
=== Heads of predecessor government agencies of the ministry ===
==== State Agency for restoration of Donbas ====
Name of minister	Term of office	
Name of minister	Start	End
Andriy Nikolayenko	22 September 2014	14 October 2014
Vadym Chernysh	26 June 2015	20 April 2016

==== State Service on issues of the Autonomous Republic of Crimea and Sevastopol city ====
Name of minister	Term of office	
Name of minister	Start	End
Aslan Ömer Kırımlı	14 May 2015	19 August 2015
Nariman Ustayev	20 August 2015	20 April 2016

=== List of ministers of the Ministry of Temporarily Occupied Territories [and IDPs] ===
Name of ministry	Name of minister	Term of office		Photo
Name of ministry	Name of minister	Start	End	Photo
Temporarily Occupied Territories and IDPs	Vadym Chernysh	20 April 2016 (Note: Chernysh was appointed the Minister on 14 April 2016, while the ministry was approved to be established only on 20 April 2016.)	29 August 2019	
Temporarily Occupied Territories, IDPs and veterans	Oksana Koliada	29 August 2019	4 March 2020	
Reintegration of Temporarily Occupied Territories	Oleksii Reznikov	4 March 2020	3 November 2021	
Reintegration of Temporarily Occupied Territories	Iryna Vereshchuk	4 November 2021	8 August 2024	

=== List of ministers of the Ministry of National Unity of Ukraine ===
Name of ministry	Name of minister	Term of office	Photo
Ministry of National Unity of Ukraine	Oleksiy Chernyshov	3 December 2024 to 16 July 2025	

== See also ==
- Temporarily occupied and uncontrolled territories of Ukraine
- Russian military intervention in Ukraine (2014–present)
- Anti-Terrorist Operation Zone (Ukraine)
- Russo-Ukrainian War
- Humanitarian situation during the war in Donbas
