= First Deputy Prime Minister of Ukraine =

Position in the Ukrainian government

First Deputy Prime Minister of Ukraine Перший віце-прем'єр-міністр України

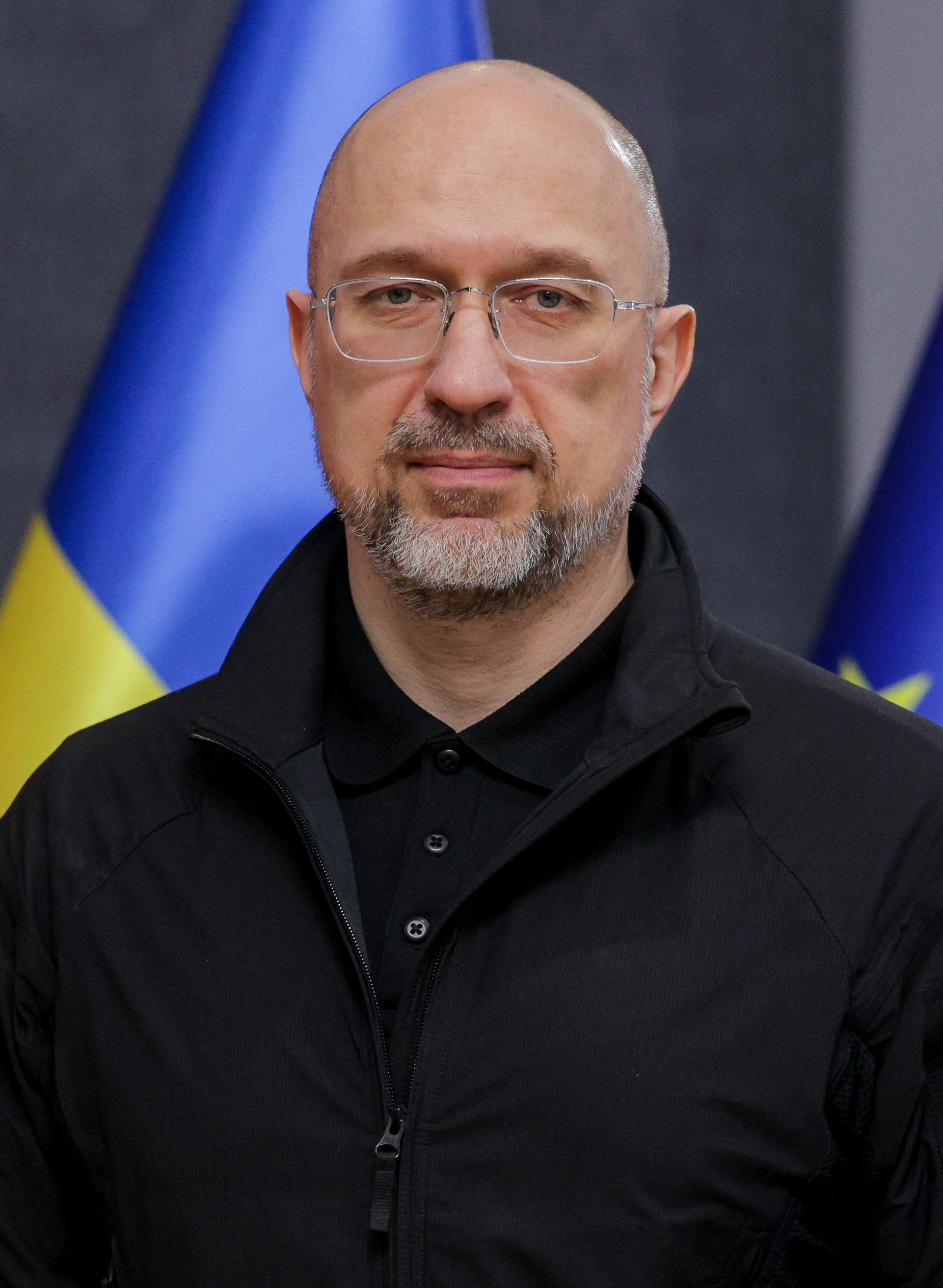
- Incumbent; Denys Shmyhal since 14 January 2026
- Member of: Cabinet of Ministers
- Seat: Government Building, Kyiv, Ukraine
- Nominator: Prime Minister of Ukraine
- Appointer: Supreme Council of Ukraine
- Term length: No fixed term
- Constituting instrument: Article 9 (About the Cabinet of Ministers of Ukraine)
- Inaugural holder: Kostiantyn Masyk (since the independence of Ukraine)
- Formation: 1946 (as First Deputy Chairman of Council of Ministers)
- Website: www.kmu.gov.ua/control/en

First Deputy Prime Minister of Ukraine is a government post of the Cabinet of Ukraine. In the absence of the prime minister of Ukraine, the first vice prime minister performs their duties (Note: Article 17, paragraph 2, Law of Ukraine about Cabinet of Ministers) as the acting prime minister. In 1991, the post was grandfathered from the already existing first deputy chairman that was part of the Council of Ministers of the Ukrainian SSR.

In an absence of the first vice prime minister, their functions are performed by other vice prime ministers who are members of the Cabinet of Ministers. Similarly to the prime minister, all official duties of the first vice prime minister are supported by the Secretariat of the Cabinet of Ministers.

Along with other members of the Cabinet of Ministers, a newly appointed first vice prime minister takes the same oath of office at a plenary session of the Verkhovna Rada (Ukrainian parliament). According to Article 10 of the Law of Ukraine about the Cabinet of Ministers, a member of the Cabinet of Ministers (except the prime minister) who refuses to take the oath is considered to have refused to accept the post. Every newly appointed member of an already existing cabinet needs to take the oath at the next plenary session of the Verkhovna Rada.

== List of first deputy prime ministers of Ukraine ==
=== Council of Ministers of the Ukrainian SSR ===
| No. | Portrait | Name | Took office | Left office | Chairman |
|---|---|---|---|---|---|
| 1 | | Oleksandr Tkachenko | July 1990 | August 1990 | Vitaliy Masol |
| 2 | | Anatoly Statynov | 1990 | 1990 | Vitaliy Masol |
| 3 | | Kostyantyn Masyk | August 1990 | 1992 | Vitold Fokin |

=== Cabinet of Ministers of Ukraine ===
In April 1991 the Council of Ministers represented by existing government of Vitold Fokin and created by 12th convocation of the Verkhovna Rada of Ukrainian SSR was renamed into the Cabinet of Ministers. With adoption of the Act of Independence of Ukraine, the Ukrainian SSR was officially renamed into Ukraine. Because of the 1991 August Putsch in Moscow, the Communist Party was prohibited in Ukraine. In February 1992 there was adopted the new coat of arms.

| No. | Portrait | Name | Took office | Left office | Prime minister(s) |
|---|---|---|---|---|---|
| 1 | | Kostyantyn Masyk | August 1990 | July 1992 | Vitold Fokin |
| 2 | | Valentyn Symonenko | July 1992 | October 1992 | Vitold Fokin |
| 3 | | Ihor Yukhnovskyi | October 1992 | March 1993 | Leonid Kuchma |
| 4 | | Yukhym Zvyahilsky | June 1993 | July 1994 | Leonid Kuchma |
| 5 | | Viktor Pynzenyk | 31 October 1994 | August 1995 | Vitaliy Masol |
| 6 | | Yevhen Marchuk | 1994 | 8 June 1995 | Vitaliy Masol |
| 7 | | Pavlo Lazarenko | September 1995 | May 1996 | Yevhen Marchuk |
| 8 | | Vasyl Durdynets | June 1996 | July 1997 | Pavlo Lazarenko |
| 9 | | Anatoliy Holubchenko | 8 August 1997 | January 1998 | Valeriy Pustovoitenko |
| 10 | | Volodymyr Kuratchenko | January 1998 | July 1999 | Valeriy Pustovoitenko |
| 11 | | Anatoliy Kinakh | July 1999 | 1999 | Valeriy Pustovoitenko |
| 12 | | Yuriy Yekhanurov | December 1999 | May 2001 | Viktor Yushchenko |
| 13 | | Oleh Dubyna | May 2001 | November 2002 | Anatoliy Kinakh |
| 14 | | Mykola Azarov | November 2002 | April 2005 | Viktor Yanukovych |
| 15 | | Anatoliy Kinakh | August 2005 | July 2006 | Yulia Tymoshenko |
| 16 | | Stanislav Stashevsky | April 2005 | August 2005 | Yuriy Yekhanurov |
| 17 | | Mykola Azarov | July 2006 | December 2007 | Viktor Yanukovych |
| 18 | | Oleksandr Turchynov | December 2007 | 11 March 2010 | Yulia Tymoshenko |
| 19 | | Andriy Klyuyev | 11 March 2010 | 14 February 2012 | Mykola Azarov |
| 20 | | Valeriy Khoroshkovskyi | 14 February 2012 | 24 December 2012 | Mykola Azarov |
| 21 | | Serhiy Arbuzov | 24 December 2012 | 27 February 2014 | Mykola Azarov |
| 22 | | Vitaliy Yarema | 27 February 2014 | 19 June 2014 | Arseniy Yatsenyuk |
| 23 | | Stepan Kubiv | 14 April 2016 | 29 August 2019 | Volodymyr Groysman |
| 24 | | Oleksiy Liubchenko | 20 May 2021 | 3 November 2021 | Denys Shmyhal |
| 25 | | Yulia Svyrydenko | 4 November 2021 | 17 July 2025 | Denys Shmyhal |
| 26 | | Mykhailo Fedorov | 17 July 2025 | 13 January 2026 | Yulia Svyrydenko |
| 27 | | Denys Shmyhal | 14 January 2026 | Incumbent | Yulia Svyrydenko |

== See also ==
- Deputy Prime Minister of Ukraine
