= Oleksiy Liubchenko =

Ukrainian politician (born 1971)

- Олексій Любченко
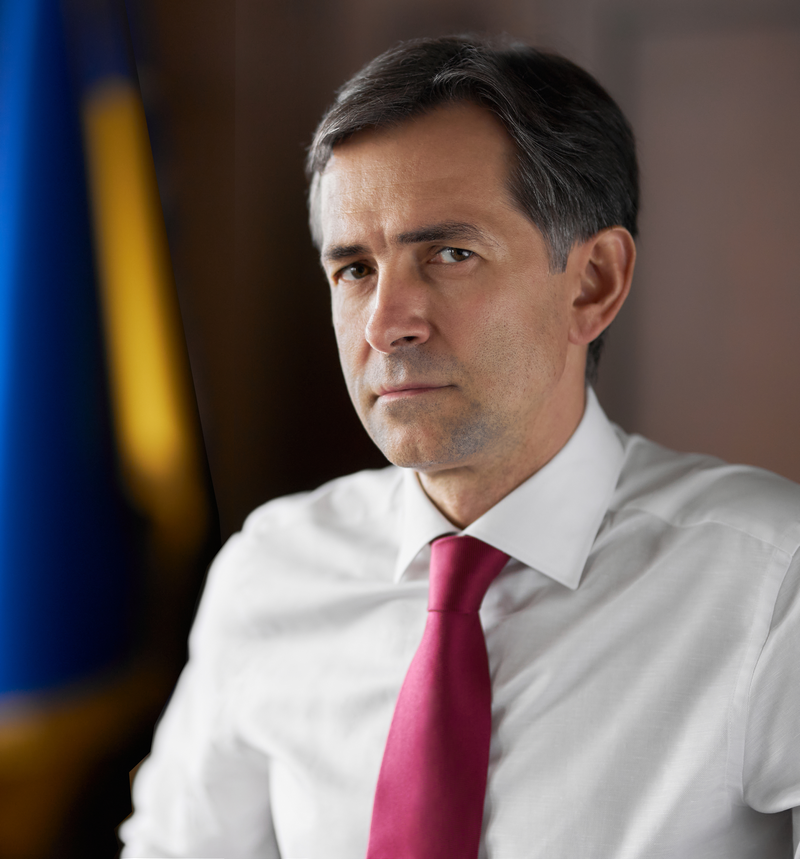
- Official portrait, 2021

24th First Deputy Prime Minister of Ukraine
- In office 20 May 2021 – 3 November 2021
- Appointed by: Verkhovna Rada
- President: Volodymyr Zelenskyy
- Preceded by: Stepan Kubiv
- Succeeded by: Yulia Svyrydenko

Personal details
- Born: Oleksiy Mikolayovich Lyubchenko; 21 September 1971 (age 54) Horodyshche Raion, Ukrainian SSR, USSR

Oleksiy Mykolayovych Liubchenko (Ukrainian: Олексій Миколайович Любченко, IPA: [olekˈs⁽ʲ⁾ij mɪkoˈlɑjowɪtʃ lʲʊbˈtʃɛnko]; born 21 September 1971) is a Ukrainian politician who served as First Vice Prime Minister of Ukraine from 20 May 2021 to 3 November 2021 and Minister of Economy.

== Biography ==
Liubchenko was born in the district of Horodyshche, Cherkasy Oblast in Ukraine. After graduating from high school, he spent some time working at the Smila Machine Building Plant. From 1988 to 1993 he studied at the Kyiv National Economic University, graduating with a specialty of economics and social planning. After a graduating for a year he worked as an expert in the macroeconomics program at the Center for Market Reforms in Kyiv, but returned to Smila at end of the year where he got a job working in Smila's city council. At the council he became a senior economist and was then head of the department of communal property and entrepreneurship. In 1998 he became deputy mayor and Deputy Head of the Department of Economics to the Governor of Cherkasy Oblast.

In 1999 he went to work for the state tax administration of the Kirovohrad Oblast, in May becoming First Deputy Head of the administration. In 2003 he became head of the state tax administration in the Cherkasy Oblast, a position he held until 2005 when he became Deputy Chairman of the Kirovohrad Oblast State Administration. In 2007 he became a doctoral student at the Council for the Study of the Productive Forces of Ukraine of the National Academy of Sciences of Ukraine, graduating in 2009 whereupon he became Deputy Chairman of the state tax administration.

== Personal life ==
He is fluent in German and is married with a son named Andrei who was born in 1994.

== Awards ==
- Order of Merit 3rd class (23 October 2004)
