= Denys Shmyhal =

Prime Minister of Ukraine from 2020 to 2025

- Денис Шмигаль
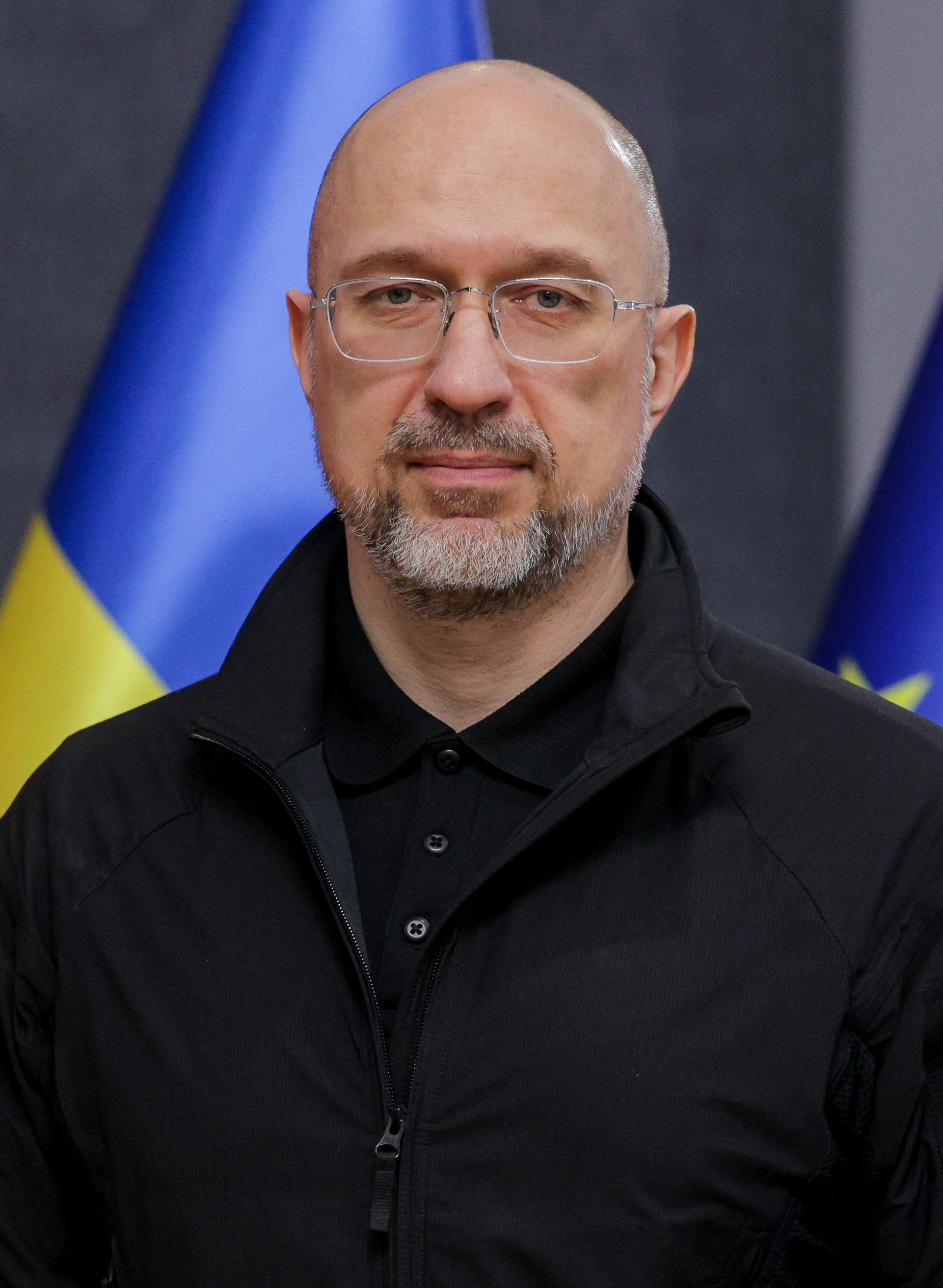
- Official portrait, 2025

18th Prime Minister of Ukraine
- In office 4 March 2020 – 17 July 2025
- President: Volodymyr Zelenskyy
- First Deputy: Oleksiy Liubchenko; Yulia Svyrydenko
- Preceded by: Oleksiy Honcharuk
- Succeeded by: Yulia Svyrydenko

First Deputy Prime Minister of Ukraine Minister of Energy
- Incumbent
- Assumed office 14 January 2026
- President: Volodymyr Zelenskyy
- Prime Minister: Yulia Svyrydenko; Serhii Koretskyi
- Preceded by: Mykhailo Fedorov (as First Deputy Prime Minister); Artem Nekrasov (as acting Minister of Energy)
Ministerial offices
Minister of Defense
In office 17 July 2025 – 13 January 2026
| President | Volodymyr Zelenskyy |
| Prime Minister | Yulia Svyrydenko |
| Preceded by | Rustem Umerov |
| Succeeded by | Mykhailo Fedorov |
Minister of Regional Development, Construction and Housing
In office 4 February 2020 – 4 March 2020
| Prime Minister | Oleksiy Honcharuk |
| Preceded by | Aliona Babak |
| Succeeded by | Oleksiy Chernyshov |

Governor of Ivano-Frankivsk Oblast
- In office 1 August 2019 – 5 February 2020
- President: Volodymyr Zelenskyy
- Prime Minister: Volodymyr Groysman; Oleksiy Honcharuk
- Preceded by: Oleh Honcharuk
- Succeeded by: Vitaliy Fedoriv (acting)

Personal details
- Born: Denys Anatoliiovych Shmyhal; 15 October 1975 (age 51) Lviv, Ukrainian SSR, Soviet Union
- Party: Independent
- Other political affiliations: People's Control (2015)
- Spouse: Kateryna Shmyhal
- Children: 2
- Education: Lviv Polytechnic
- Occupation: Politician; entrepreneur

Denys Anatoliiovych Shmyhal (Note: Ukrainian: Денис Анатолійович Шмигаль, pronounced [deˈnɪs ɐnɐˈtɔl⁽ʲ⁾ijowɪtʃ ʃmɪˈɦɑlʲ]) (born 15 October 1975) is a Ukrainian politician and entrepreneur who served as the 18th prime minister of Ukraine from 2020 to 2025. He has served as the First Deputy Prime Minister of Ukraine and the Minister of Energy of Ukraine since 14 January 2026, previously serving as the minister of defence from 2025 to 2026, as governor of Ivano-Frankivsk Oblast from 2019 to 2020 and as an acting deputy prime minister in the Honcharuk government.

As prime minister, Shmyhal was in charge of handling the response to the COVID-19 pandemic in Ukraine and conducting the defense of Ukraine during the 2022 Russian invasion. On 15 July 2025, Shmyhal submitted his resignation, a day after President Volodymyr Zelenskyy announced a government reshuffle and proposed replacing Shmyhal with Yulia Svyrydenko as prime minister. His tenure as prime minister of over five years was the longest in Ukrainian history. After Svyrydenko took office, he was appointed as the defence minister.

== Early life ==
Shmyhal's parents are Anatolii Ivanovych and Iryna Feliksovna. In 1997, Shmyhal graduated from the Lviv Polytechnic university. He holds the PhD-equivalent title of Candidate of Economic Sciences (2003).

== Early career ==
From his graduation in 1997 until September 2005, Shmyhal worked as an accountant in various companies. From September 2005 to June 2006, Shmyhal was Deputy General Director of a company called "LA DIS". From June 2006 to August 2008, he was Director for the investment company "Comfort-Invest". From September 2008 to September 2009, Shmyhal was General Director of a company called "Rosaninvest LLC".

== Political career ==
Shmyhal worked in multiple leading political roles in Ukraine's Lviv Oblast from 2009 until December 2013. Firstly, as the Head of the Department of Economics at the Lviv Oblast Administration between 2009 and 2011. It is there where he met and worked with Oleh Nemchinov who would, in 2020, become Minister of the Cabinet of Ministers in the Shmyhal Government. Shmyhal then became the Head of the Department of Economics and Industrial Policy for the whole of 2012. In 2013, he was Head of the Department of Economic Development, Investment, Trade and Industry.

For the first four months of 2014, Shmyhal was a consultant to a People's Deputy of Ukraine Roman Cherneha (from the party UDAR).

From May 2014 to December 2014, Shmyhal worked as Deputy Head of the Lviv Oblast regional office of the Ministry of Revenues and Duties.

In the 2014 Ukrainian parliamentary election Shmyhal was an independent candidate in Ukraine's 121st electoral district, located in Lviv Oblast. He gained 188 votes. (Bohdan Matkivskyi won the district with 26,924 votes.)

In the 2015 Ukrainian local elections Shmyhal was a candidate for the Lviv Oblast Council of People's Movement "People's Control". Although "People's Control" did win five seats in this regional parliament, Shmyhal himself did not get elected.

He served as Vice President of Lviv-based frozen goods distributor TVK Lvivkholod from 2015 to 2017.

From 2018 to 2019, Shmyhal served as Director of the Burshtyn TES which is the largest electricity producer in Ivano-Frankivsk, and is part of Rinat Akhmetov's holdings.

From 1 August 2019 until his prime ministerial appointment, Shmyhal was the Governor of Ivano-Frankivsk Oblast.

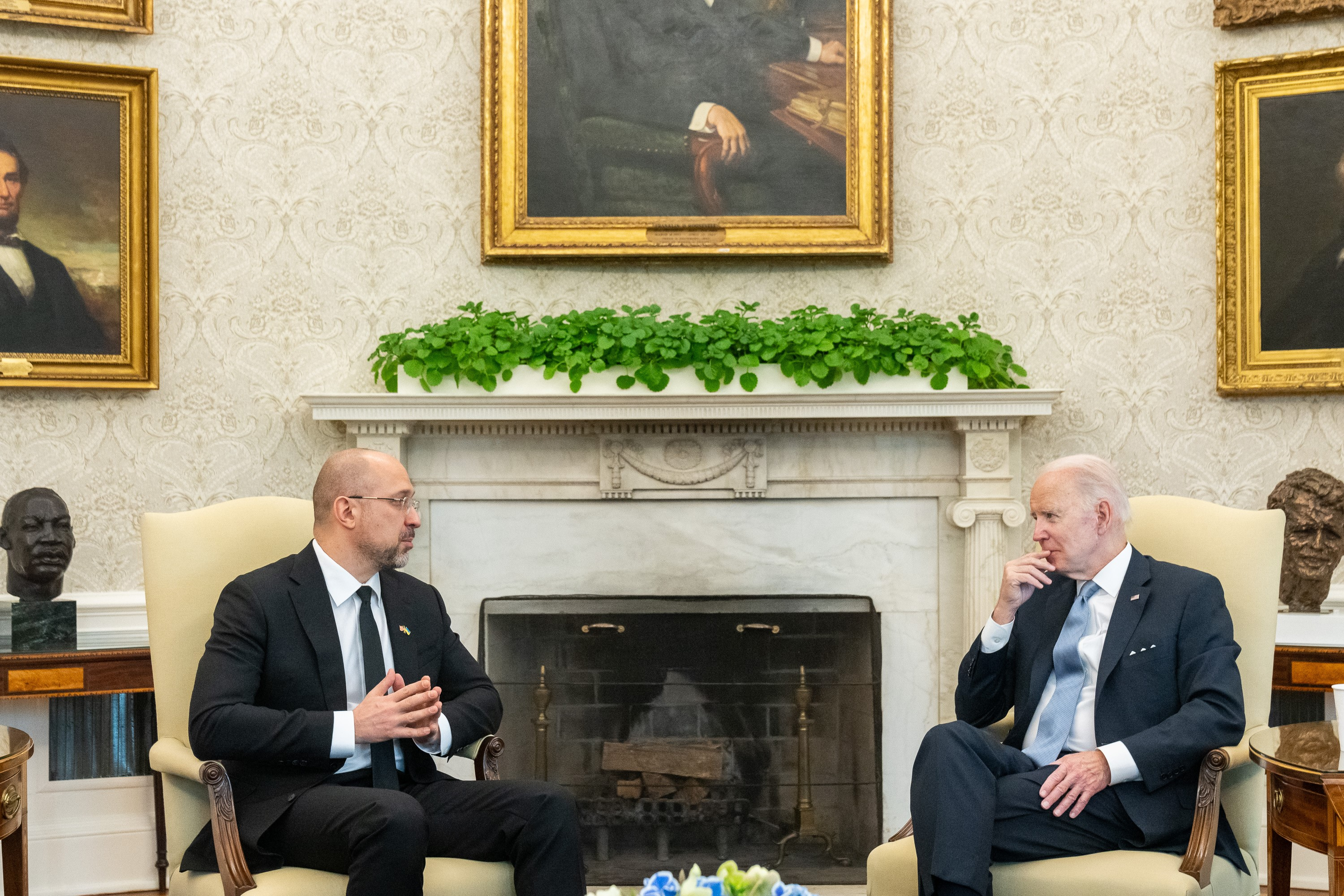
Shmyhal meets with President Joe Biden in Washington D.C., on 21 April 2022

On 4 February 2020, he was appointed Minister of Regional Development.

=== Prime Minister of Ukraine ===
Shmyhal replaced Oleksiy Honcharuk as the prime minister of Ukraine in March 2020. In 2021, Shmyhal was included in the list of the 100 most influential Ukrainians, according to the weekly magazine Focus. He was ranked 7th in the list.

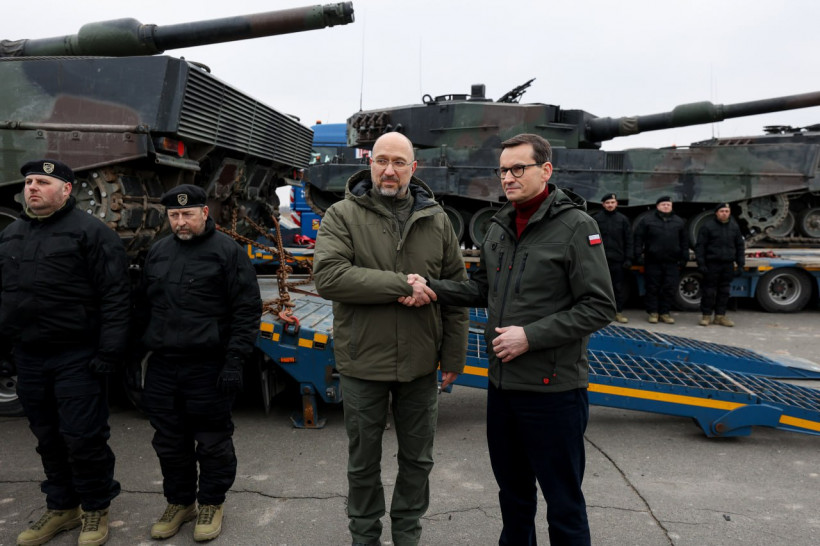
Shmyhal meets with Polish Prime Minister Mateusz Morawiecki in Kyiv, on 24 February 2023

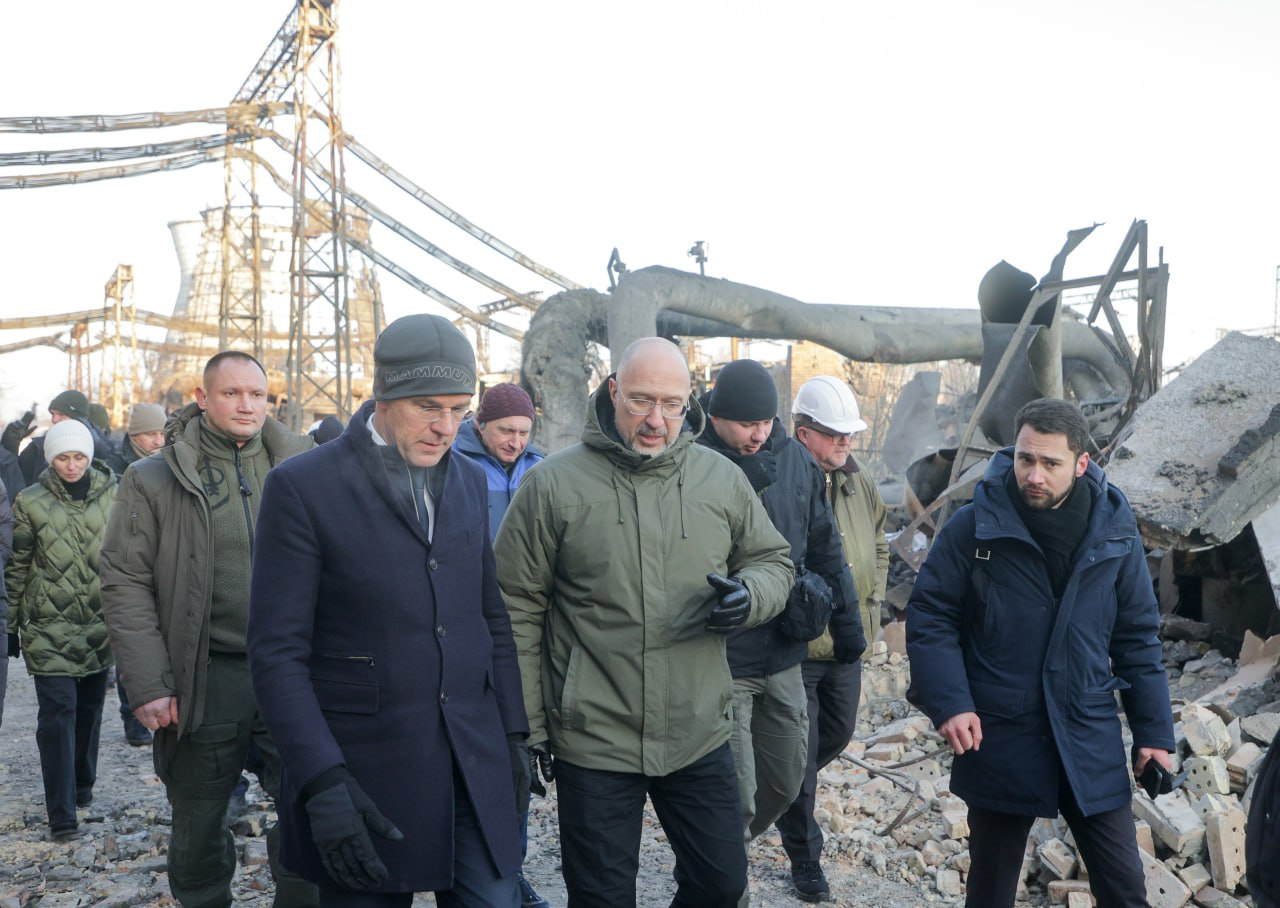
Shmyhal and NATO Secretary General Mark Rutte inspecting the damaged Darnytsia Combined Heat and Power Plant in Kyiv, 3 February 2026

In January 2024, Ukraine's National Agency on Corruption Prevention accused Shmyhal of exposing the identity of a whistleblower who had reported wrongdoing by the head of the Commission for Regulation of Gambling and Lotteries. If Shymhal is found guilty of exposing the identity of a corruption whistleblower, he would be fined and denied the right to hold certain government positions for one year, and be included in the Unified State Register of persons who have committed corruption-related offenses. The prime minister's spokesperson responded, saying that it was not a whistleblower complaint about corruption, but rather, an appeal from an employee about their dissatisfaction with the work of the head of the Commission for Regulation of Gambling and Lotteries and contained no information about anything pertaining to corruption. Shymhal received the appeal in September 2023, and had handled it according to protocol.

On 14 July 2025, Zelenskyy announced his plan to replace Shmyhal with Yulia Svyrydenko as prime minister as part of a government reshuffle; Zelenskyy suggested that Shmyhal might become defense minister. Shmyhal resigned as prime minister the next day, while the Verkhovna Rada accepted his decision on 16 July.

=== Minister of Defense of Ukraine ===
On 17 July 2025, the Verkhovna Rada approved Zelenskyy's proposal to appoint Shmyhal as Minister of Defense of Ukraine.

=== First Deputy Prime Minister — Minister of Energy of Ukraine ===
On 14 January 2026, the Verkhovna Rada of Ukraine approved Shmyhal as First Deputy Prime Minister — Minister of Energy of Ukraine.

== Personal life ==
Shmyhal is married to Kateryna Shmyhal. They have two daughters. Kateryna is a former co-owner of the Kamyanetsky Bakery in Lviv and a local Nextbike bike rental outlet. She sold her shares in these companies in 2019.

== See also ==
- Honcharuk Government
- Shmyhal Government

== Notes ==
Political offices
| Preceded by Oleksiy Honcharuk | Prime Minister of Ukraine; 2020–2025 | Succeeded by Yulia Svyrydenko |
