= Oblasts of Ukraine =

Type of first-level administrative division of Ukraine

- Category: First-level subdivision of a unitary state
- Location: Ukraine
- Created: 27 February 1932
- Number: 24 (as of 1991)
- Populations: 897,000 (Chernivtsi) to 4,157,000 (Donetsk)
- Areas: 8,100 km^{2} (3,126 sq mi) (Chernivtsi) to 33,300 km^{2} (12,860 sq mi) (Odesa)
- Government: Oblast State Administration, Oblast Council
- Subdivisions: 136 raions (districts) (Note: A total of 136 raions exist within the first-level subdivisions of Ukraine, including the 24 oblasts and the Autonomous Republic of Crimea.)

An oblast (Ukrainian: область, romanized: oblast, pronounced [ˈɔblɐsʲtʲ]; pl. області, oblasti), sometimes translated as region or province, is the main type of first-level administrative division of Ukraine. The country's territory is divided into 24 oblasts, as well as one autonomous republic and two cities with special status.

As Ukraine is a unitary state, oblasts do not have much legal scope of competence other than that which is established in the Ukrainian Constitution and devolved by law. Articles 140–146 of Chapter XI of the constitution deal directly with local authorities and their competence.

Oblasts are divided into raions, between three and ten each, following the July 2020 reform.

== General characteristics ==
In Ukraine, the term oblast denotes a primary administrative division. Under the Russian Empire and into the 1920s, Ukraine was divided between several governorates. The term oblast was introduced in 1932 by Soviet authorities when the Ukrainian SSR was divided into seven oblasts, replacing the previous subdivision system based on okruhas and encompassing 406 raions (districts). The first oblasts were Vinnytsia Oblast, Kyiv Oblast, Odesa Oblast, Kharkiv Oblast, and Dnipropetrovsk Oblast. Soon after that, in the summer of 1932, Donetsk Oblast was formed out of eastern parts of Kharkiv and Dnipropetrovsk oblasts; in the fall of 1932 Chernihiv Oblast was formed on the border of Kyiv and Kharkiv oblasts.

Between 1935 and 1938, there were several newly created and self-governed special border okrugs (okruhas) located along the western border of the Soviet Union in Ukraine and Belarus. Upon liquidation of the okruhas in 1937–1938, Kyiv, Vinnytsia, Odesa, and Kharkiv oblasts were each split into four additional oblasts (Zhytomyr Oblast, Kamianets-Podilsky Oblast (later Khmelnytskyi), Mykolaiv Oblast, Poltava Oblast). Just before World War II, the Donetsk Oblast was split into Stalino Oblast and Voroshylovhrad Oblast and the Kirovohrad Oblast was created out of portions of Kyiv, Mykolaiv and Odesa oblasts.

During World War II, Ukraine added eight more oblasts of the West Ukraine and Bessarabia. Upon the occupation of Ukraine by Nazi Germany the territory was split between General Government, Kingdom of Romania and Reichskommissariat Ukraine and carried out a completely different administrative division, see Reichskommissariat Ukraine. With the re-establishing of Soviet power in the state after the war, the administrative division by oblast resumed, adding one more oblast—Zakarpattia. In 1954, the Crimean Oblast was transferred from the Russian Soviet Federative Socialist Republic to the Ukrainian SSR; parts of the surrounding oblasts were incorporated into the Cherkasy Oblast, while Izmail Oblast was absorbed by Odesa Oblast. In 1959, Drohobych Oblast was merged with Lviv Oblast.

Most of Ukraine's oblasts are named after their respective administrative centers, which are also the largest and most developed cities in the region. Oblast populations range from 904,000 in Chernivtsi Oblast to 4.4 million in the eastern Donetsk Oblast.

=== Original in 1932 ===
- Dnipropetrovsk Oblast, centered in Dnipropetrovsk (subdivided into raions)
- Kharkiv Oblast, centered in Kharkiv (subdivided into raions)
- Kyiv Oblast, centered in Kyiv (subdivided into raions)
- Odesa Oblast, centered in Odesa (subdivided into raions)
- Vinnytsia Oblast, centered in Vinnytsia (subdivided into raions)
- raions of republican subordination (directly to Kharkiv)

Later there were added

- Donetsk Oblast, centered in Stalino (initially – Artemivsk) (created on 17 July 1932 out of raions of Kharkiv and Dnipropetrovsk oblasts and raions of republican subordination)
- Chernihiv Oblast, centered in Chernihiv (created on 15 October 1932 out of raions of Kharkiv and Kyiv oblasts)

=== Further division in 1937–1938 ===
- Kamianets-Podilsk Oblast, centered in Kamianets-Podilsk (out of raions of Vinnytsia Oblast)
- Mykolaiv Oblast, centered in Mykolaiv (out of raions of Odesa and Dnipropetrovsk oblasts)
- Poltava Oblast, centered in Poltava (out of raions of Kharkiv and Kyiv oblasts)
- Zhytomyr Oblast, centered in Zhytomyr (out of raions of Vinnytsia and Kyiv oblasts)
- Donetsk Oblast was split into Stalino Oblast, centered in Stalino, and Voroshylovhrad Oblast, centered in Voroshylovhrad

=== New creations and World War II territorial expansions in 1939–1940 ===
- Kirovohrad Oblast, centered in Kirovohrad (out of raions of Kyiv, Odesa, Poltava and Mykolaiv oblasts)
- Sumy Oblast, centered in Sumy (out of raions of Chernihiv, Poltava and Kharkiv oblasts)
- Zaporizhzhia Oblast, centered in Zaporizhzhia (out of raions of Dnipropetrovsk and Mykolaiv oblasts)
- Drohobych Oblast, centered in Drohobych
- Ivano-Frankivsk Oblast, centered in Ivano-Frankivsk
- Lviv Oblast, centered in Lviv
- Volyn Oblast, centered in Lutsk
- Rivne Oblast, centered in Rivne
- Tarnopol Oblast, centered in Tarnopol
- Chernivtsi Oblast, centered in Chernivtsi
- Izmail Oblast, centered in Izmail

=== Post-war ===
- Kherson Oblast, centered in Kherson
- Zakarpattia Oblast, centered in Uzhhorod
- Cherkasy Oblast, centered in Cherkasy
- Crimean Oblast, centered in Simferopol

=== Maps ===
The okruhas of Ukraine in 1929–1930

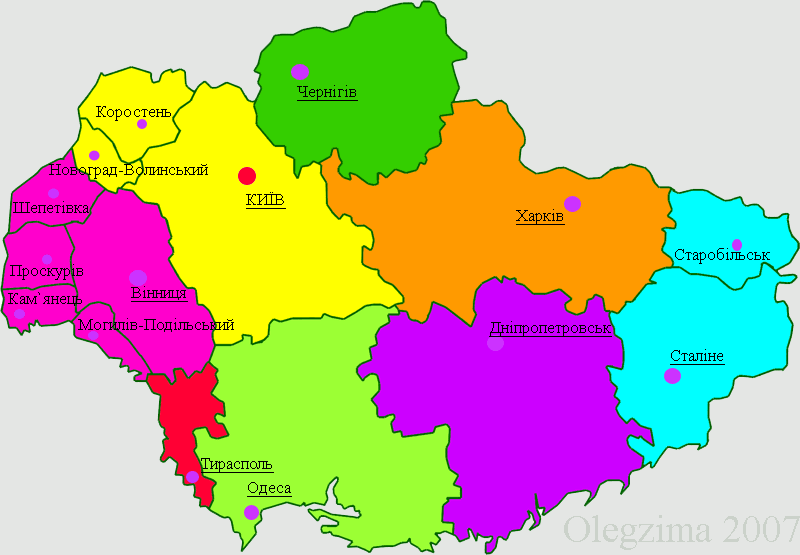
After 1935; including recently created Donetsk and Chernihiv Oblasts and border okruhas

Border okruhas are liquidated and four additional oblasts created in 1937

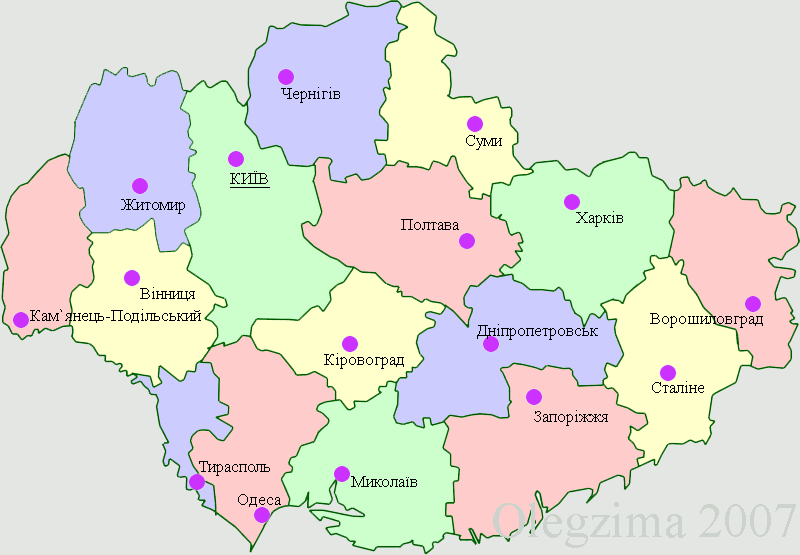
Creation of additional oblasts just before World War II

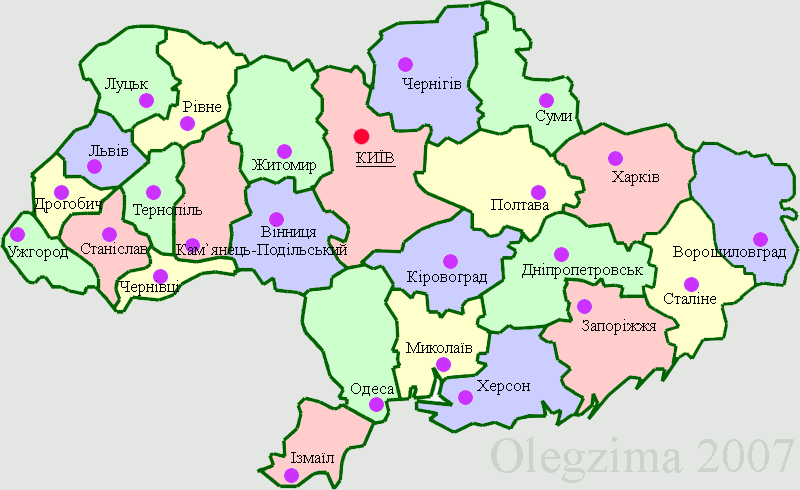
Post-war divisions of Ukraine

== Constitutional provisions and authority ==
The Ukrainian constitution establishes Ukraine as a unitary state. The specific text of the constitution that refers to the territorial structure is as follows.

The territorial structure of Ukraine is based on the principles of unity and indivisibility of the state territory, the combination of centralisation and decentralisation in the exercise of state power, and the balanced socio-economic development of regions that takes into account their historical, economic, ecological, geographical and demographic characteristics, and ethnic and cultural traditions.

— Constitution of Ukraine, Chapter IX: Territorial Structure of Ukraine, Article 132

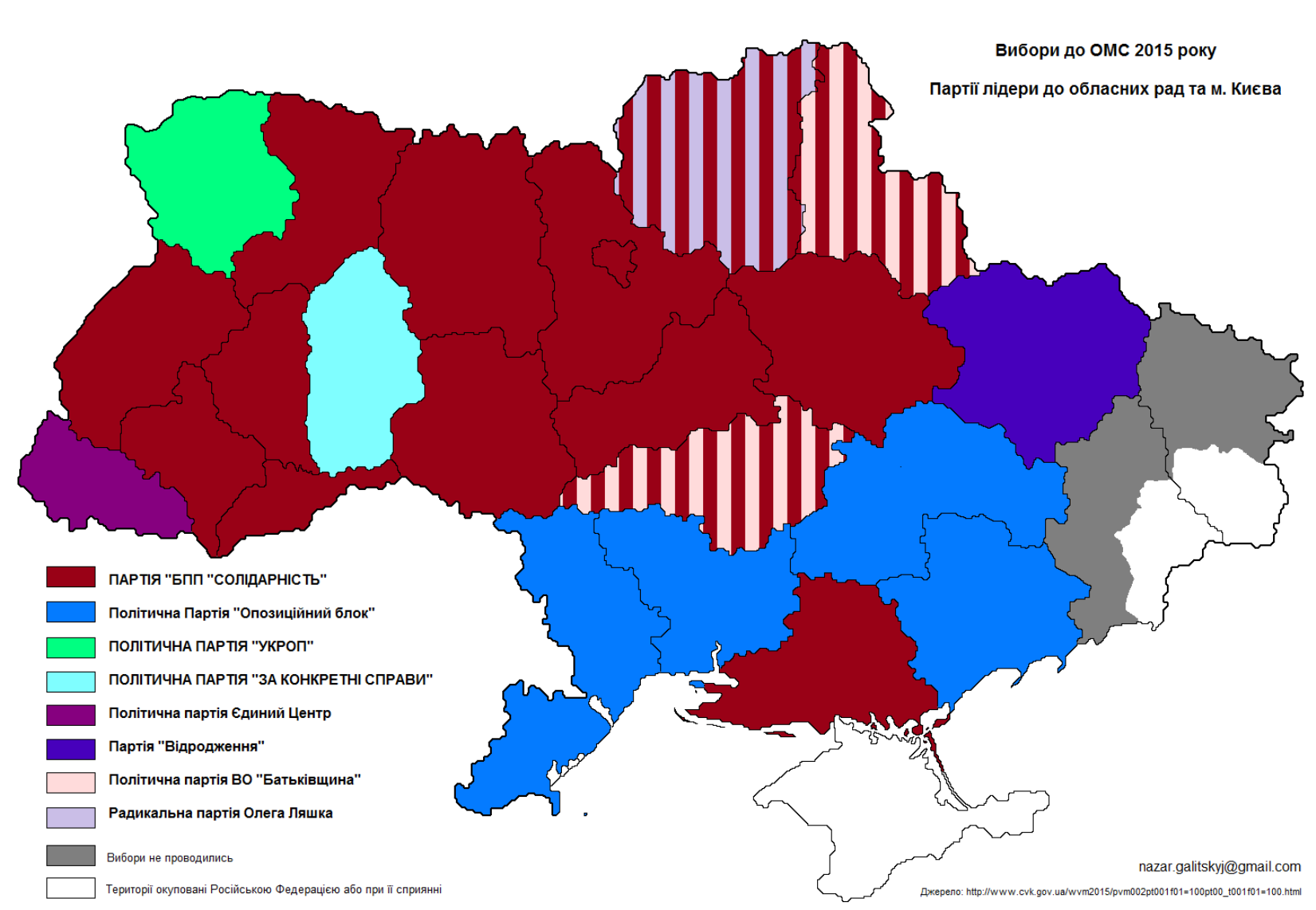
Election results of the 2015 regional parliamentarian elections

Each of Ukraine's oblasts has its own legislative and executive authority, most of which is subordinate to the central government authorities in Kyiv. Each region is administered under laws passed by the Ukrainian government and the Constitution of Ukraine. Each region levies its own taxes and, in return, receives a portion of its budget from Kyiv, which gives them a portion of the taxes it levies.

Executive power in each of the oblasts (as well as in other subdivisions of Ukraine) is exercised by local elected administrations. The heads of local administrations are in turn appointed and dismissed by the President of Ukraine upon nomination by the Cabinet of Ministers. Since Ukraine is a unitary state, there is little true political power and weight that these local administrations actually hold. Carrying out their authority, the heads of local administrations are accountable to the President and are subordinate to higher bodies of executive leadership. According to the Constitution the head of the heads of the local Oblast administrations should resign after a new President is elected.

Legislative power in the oblast governments is exercised by their respective oblast councils, which in turn supervise the activities of local administrations. They also have considerable budgets managed by an oblast council (Ukrainian: обласна рада) made up of people's deputies (representatives) voted into office in regional elections every four years, the last of which took place in 2020.

== Nomenclature ==
The name of each oblast is a relative adjective, formed by adding a feminine suffix to the name of respective center city. For example, Poltava is the administrative center of Poltava Oblast. Most of them are also sometimes referred to in a feminine noun form, following the convention of traditional regional place names, ending with the suffix "-shchyna", such as Poltava Oblast, which is also called Poltavshchyna (Ukrainian: Полтавщина).

Exceptions to this rule include two oblasts, Volyn and Zakarpattia, which retain the names of their respective historical regions, Volyn (Volhynia) and Zakarpattia (Transcarpathia), whose respective capitals are Lutsk and Uzhhorod.

The capital cities of the Dnipropetrovsk Oblast and Kirovohrad Oblast were renamed to Dnipro and Kropyvnytskyi in 2016 as part of a process of replacing Soviet toponyms. As the names of the oblasts are mentioned in the Ukrainian constitution, changing them requires a complicated and lengthy process, thus as of 2024, the two oblasts still formally retain their Soviet-era names.

== List ==
According to the Ukrainian constitution, Ukraine is divided into 24 oblasts. Four oblasts, written in italics, are partially under Russian occupation.

| Region | Area (km^{2}) | Population (2022) | Pop. density | Administrative center | Raions | Hromadas | License plate prefix |
|---|---|---|---|---|---|---|---|
| Cherkasy Oblast | 20,891 | 1,198,000 | 61.80 | Cherkasy | 4 | 66 | CA, IA |
| Chernihiv Oblast | 31,851.3 | 994,000 | 34.67 | Chernihiv | 5 | 57 | CB, IB |
| Chernivtsi Oblast | 8,093.6 | 897,000 | 111.67 | Chernivtsi | 3 | 52 | CE, IE |
| Dnipropetrovsk Oblast | 31,900.5 | 3,214,000 | 104.83 | Dnipro | 7 | 86 | AE, KE |
| Donetsk Oblast | 26,505.7 | 4,157,000 | 167.81 | Donetsk (Kramatorsk) | 8 | 66 | AH, KH |
| Ivano-Frankivsk Oblast | 13,894.0 | 1,382,000 | 99.38 | Ivano-Frankivsk | 6 | 62 | AT, KT |
| Kharkiv Oblast | 31,401.6 | 2,683,000 | 87.74 | Kharkiv | 7 | 56 | AX, KX |
| Kherson Oblast | 28,449 | 1,026,000 | 38.35 | Kherson | 5 | 49 | BT, HT |
| Khmelnytskyi Oblast | 20,636.2 | 1,274,000 | 64.52 | Khmelnytskyi | 3 | 60 | BX, HX |
| Kirovohrad Oblast | 24,577.5 | 958,000 | 41.29 | Kropyvnytskyi | 4 | 49 | BA, HA |
| Kyiv Oblast | 28,118.9 | 1,775,000 | 61.15 | Kyiv | 7 | 69 | AI, KI |
| Luhansk Oblast | 26,672.5 | 2,145,000 | 86.25 | Luhansk (Sievierodonetsk) | 8 | 37 | BB, HB |
| Lviv Oblast | 21,823.7 | 2,515,000 | 116.65 | Lviv | 7 | 73 | BC, HC |
| Mykolaiv Oblast | 24,587.4 | 1,126,000 | 48.25 | Mykolaiv | 4 | 52 | BE, HE |
| Odesa Oblast | 33,295.9 | 2,395,000 | 71.71 | Odesa | 7 | 91 | BH, HH |
| Poltava Oblast | 28,735.8 | 1,392,000 | 51.98 | Poltava | 4 | 60 | BI, HI |
| Rivne Oblast | 20,038.5 | 1,146,000 | 57.52 | Rivne | 4 | 64 | BK, HK |
| Sumy Oblast | 23,823.9 | 1,094,000 | 48.97 | Sumy | 5 | 51 | BM, HM |
| Ternopil Oblast | 13,817.1 | 1,035,000 | 78.65 | Ternopil | 3 | 55 | BO, HO |
| Vinnytsia Oblast | 26,501.6 | 1,566,000 | 62.12 | Vinnytsia | 6 | 63 | AB, KB |
| Volyn Oblast | 20,135.3 | 1,046,000 | 51.56 | Lutsk | 4 | 54 | AC, KC |
| Zakarpattia Oblast | 12,771.5 | 1,247,000 | 97.59 | Uzhhorod | 6 | 64 | AO, KO |
| Zaporizhzhia Oblast | 27,168.5 | 1,699,000 | 66.45 | Zaporizhzhia | 5 | 67 | AP, KP |
| Zhytomyr Oblast | 29,819.2 | 1,213,000 | 43.03 | Zhytomyr | 4 | 65 | AM, KM |

=== Former ===
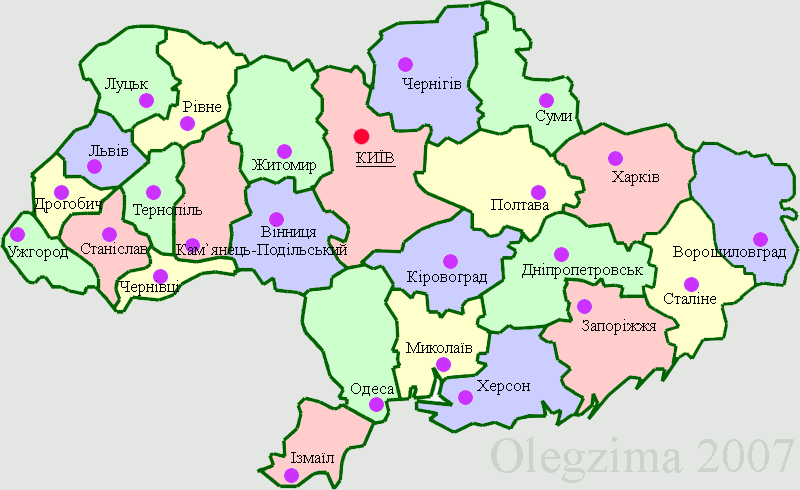
Map of the administrative divisions of the Ukrainian SSR from 1946–1954 shows the Izmail Oblast and Drohobych Oblast

- Izmail Oblast (initially as Akkerman Oblast) existed in 1940–41 and 1944–54 (under Romanian occupation, later was added to Odesa Oblast)
- Drohobych Oblast existed from 1939–1941 and 1944–1959 (under German occupation, it was merged into Lviv Oblast)
- Crimean Oblast (1954–1991) was transformed into Crimean ASSR

=== Renamed ===
- Stalino Oblast was the name of Donetsk Oblast 1938–41 and 1943–61 (created out of the united Donetsk Oblast 1932–38, German occupation 1941–43)
- Akkerman Oblast was the name of Izmail Oblast 1940
- Stanislav Oblast was the name of Ivano-Frankivsk Oblast 1939–41 and 1944–62 (German occupation 1941–44)
- Kamianets-Podilskyi Oblast was the name of Khmelnytskyi Oblast 1937–41 and 1944–54 (German occupation 1941–44, later transfer of administrative center to Khmelnytskyi)
- Voroshylovhrad Oblast was the name of Luhansk Oblast 1938–42, 1943–58 and 1970–90 (German occupation 1942–43)
- Tarnopil Oblast was the name of Ternopil Oblast 1939–41 (renamed soon after World War II)

The Dnipropetrovsk Oblast and Kirovohrad Oblast are pending renaming following the renaming of their capital cities to Dnipro and Kropyvnytskyi.

== Government ==
=== Governors and legislatures ===
| Name | Executive | | Legislature | | | |
| Name | Governor | Current Governor | Oblast Council | Building | No. of seats | Seating plan |
|---|---|---|---|---|---|---|
| Cherkasy | Governor of Cherkasy Oblast | Ihor Taburets | Cherkasy Oblast Council | | 64 | |
| Chernihiv | Governor of Chernihiv Oblast | Vyacheslav Chaus | Chernihiv Oblast Council | | 64 | |
| Chernivtsi | Governor of Chernivtsi Oblast | Ruslan Osypenko | Chernivtsi Oblast Council | | 64 | |
| Dnipropetrovsk | Governor of Dnipropetrovsk Oblast | Oleksandr Hanzha | Dnipropetrovsk Oblast Council | | 120 | |
| Donetsk | Governor of Donetsk Oblast | Vadym Filashkin | Donetsk Oblast Council | | 163 | |
| Ivano-Frankivsk | Governor of Ivano-Frankivsk Oblast | Svitlana Onyschuk | Ivano-Frankivsk Oblast Council | | 84 | |
| Kharkiv | Governor of Kharkiv Oblast | Oleh Synyehubov | Kharkiv Oblast Council | | 120 | |
| Kherson | Governor of Kherson Oblast | Oleksandr Prokudin (Note: The position is disputed. Vladimir Saldo was appointed Governor on 26 April 2022 by the Russian military following the occupation of Kherson Oblast.) | Kherson Oblast Council | | 64 | |
| Khmelnytskyi | Governor of Khmelnytskyi Oblast | Serhii Tiurin | Khmelnytskyi Oblast Council | | 64 | |
| Kyiv | Governor of Kyiv Oblast | Mykola Kalashnyk | Kyiv Oblast Council | | 84 | |
| Kirovohrad | Governor of Kirovohrad Oblast | Andriy Raykovych | Kirovohrad Oblast Council | | 64 | |
| Luhansk | Governor of Luhansk Oblast | Oleksii Kharchenko | Luhansk Oblast Council | | 124 | |
| Lviv | Governor of Lviv Oblast | Maksym Kozytskyy | Lviv Oblast Council | | 84 | |
| Mykolaiv | Governor of Mykolaiv Oblast | Vitaliy Kim | Mykolaiv Oblast Council | | 64 | |
| Odesa | Governor of Odesa Oblast | Oleh Kiper | Odesa Oblast Council | | 84 | |
| Poltava | Governor of Poltava Oblast | Vitaliy Dyakivnych | Poltava Oblast Council | | 84 | |
| Rivne | Governor of Rivne Oblast | Oleksandr Koval | Rivne Oblast Council | | 64 | |
| Sumy | Governor of Sumy Oblast | Oleh Hryhorov | Sumy Oblast Council | | 84 | |
| Ternopil | Governor of Ternopil Oblast | Taras Pastukh | Ternopil Oblast Council | | 64 | |
| Vinnytsia | Governor of Vinnytsia Oblast | Nataliya Zabolotna | Vinnytsia Oblast Council | | 84 | |
| Volyn | Governor of Volyn Oblast | Roman Romanyuk (Acting) | Volyn Oblast Council | | 64 | |
| Zakarpattia | Governor of Zakarpattia Oblast | Myroslav Biletskyi | Zakarpattia Oblast Council | | 64 | |
| Zaporizhzhia | Governor of Zaporizhzhia Oblast | Ivan Fedorov | Zaporizhzhia Oblast Council | | 84 | |
| Zhytomyr | Governor of Zhytomyr Oblast | Vitaliy Bunechko | Zhytomyr Oblast Council | | 64 | |

== See also ==
- Geography of Ukraine
- ISO 3166-2:UA
- List of etymologies of administrative divisions: Ukraine
- List of places named after people (Ukraine)
- Ukrainian historical regions
