= Andriy Nikolayenko =

Ukrainian politician

Andriy Ivanovych Nikolayenko
- Андрій Іванович Ніколаєнко
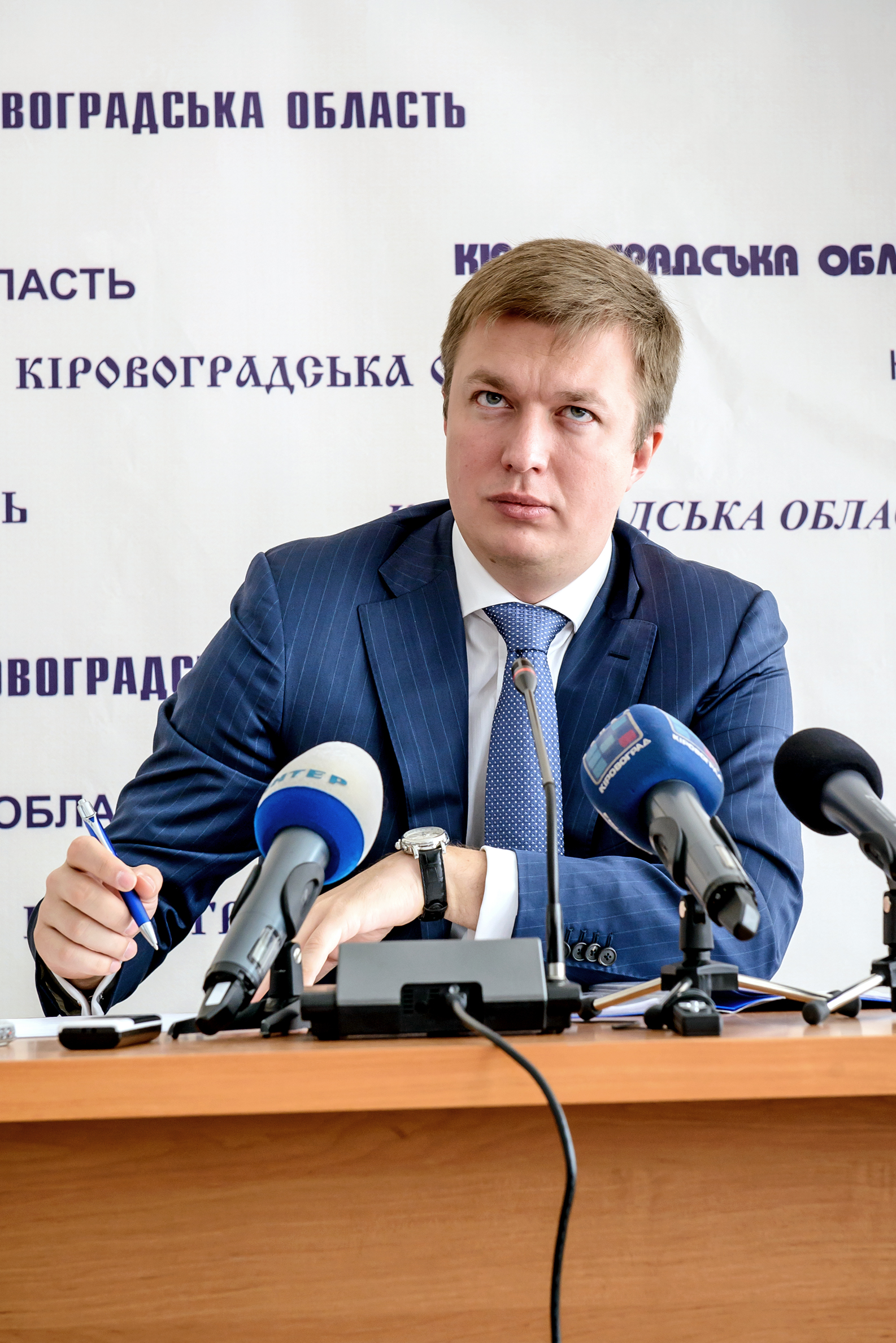
- Nikolayenko in 2013

Head of the State Agency for Restoration of Donbas
- In office 22 September 2014 – 14 October 2014
- Succeeded by: Vadym Chernysh

Personal details
- Born: 23 June 1979 (age 46) Fastiv, Ukrainian SSR, Soviet Union
- Party: Osnova
- Spouse: Iryna Nikolayenko
- Children: Daria and Yaroslava

Andriy Ivanovych Nikolayenko (Ukrainian: Андрій Іванович Ніколаєнко; born 23 June 1979) is a Ukrainian politician, diplomat, former chairman of the political party Osnova.

Nikolayenko is the first Chairman of the State Agency of Ukraine for the Recovery of Donbas in 2014. He is a coordinator of the informal association of entrepreneurs "Ukrainian Business Initiative". In 2017, he co-authored the Ukraine 2030 Balanced Development Doctrine, which proposed scientifically based mechanisms for the rapid growth of the Ukrainian economy.

In the July 2019 Ukrainian parliamentary election, Nikolayenko was placed 19th on the party list of Fatherland. He was elected to the Verkhovna Rada.

== Professional career ==
2002–2006 —attache, third secretary of the Embassy of Ukraine in the Republic of Korea.

2008–2009 – assistant and advisor of the People's Deputy of Ukraine.

2009–2010 – deputy assistant of the Head of the Department for Foreign Economic Policy and International Cooperation of the Secretariat of the Cabinet of Ministers of Ukraine, manager of the Sector for Supporting Promising Cooperation Projects with the Countries of the Asia-Pacific Region, advisor of the Prime Minister of Ukraine Yulia Tymoshenko on a voluntary basis.

2010–2011 —deputy Chairman of the Kirovograd Regional State Administration.

2011–2013 – Vice-chairman of the Kirovograd Regional State Administration.

9 January 2013 – 2 March 2014— Chairman of the Kirovograd Regional State Administration. During the events of Euromaidan, he was able to resolve the conflict with the protesters in Kropyvnytskyi.

March – September 2014 —Vice-chairman of the Donetsk Regional State Administration. He was in charge of the restoration of Sloviansk after its liberation in 2014 and restoration of uninterrupted water and electricity supply in the city.

From 1 January 2015 —chairman of the board of directors of Ukrainian company "Velta". He represented the company on the Ukrainian stand in Dubai on 2–4 April during the International Forum of UAE Investment Projects.

== Restoration of the liberated Donbas ==
23 September 2013 – 14 October 2014 – Chairman of the State Agency of Ukraine for Donbas Restoration.

He headed the preparation and coordination of the reconstruction of the Donbas. Within the authority of the agency, he coordinated the assistance of international organizations, private companies and state authorities. He was responsible for establishing the heating season in 2014–2015 for the liberated cities of Donetsk Oblast: Sloviansk, Kramatorsk, Bakhmut.

== Activities in the political party "Osnova" ==
On 10 February 2017, Andriy Nikolayenko is the head of the political party "Osnova, that advocates the non-aligned status of Ukraine and the peaceful return of the occupied Donbas and Crimea through international legal mechanisms. The party examines the successful international experience of the reform. The party program is based on the analyzed effective practices. On 22 September 2018, the Osnova party held a congress in Kyiv. According to the results of the primaries, 96% of the participants expressed "for" the participation of the party in the next election of the President. At the same time, 87% of the party voted "for" one of its leaders, people's deputy of Ukraine Serhiy Taruta as a candidate.

== Social activities ==
Andriy Nikolayenko is the President of the Baseball and Softball Federation of Ukraine from 23 February 2013. With the assistance of the Federation, the European Championship in baseball in Group C took place in Ukraine for the first time on 23–28 July 2018 in Kropyvnitsky. Ukraine was visited by baseball teams from Hungary, Romania, Georgia and Estonia. Ukraine national team won five victories in five games and became second in the Division B.

Government offices
Preceded by Serhiy Larin	Governor of Kirovohrad Oblast; 2013–2014	Succeeded by Oleksandr Petik
