= Mariya Chorna =

Ukrainian politician

- Марія Чорна
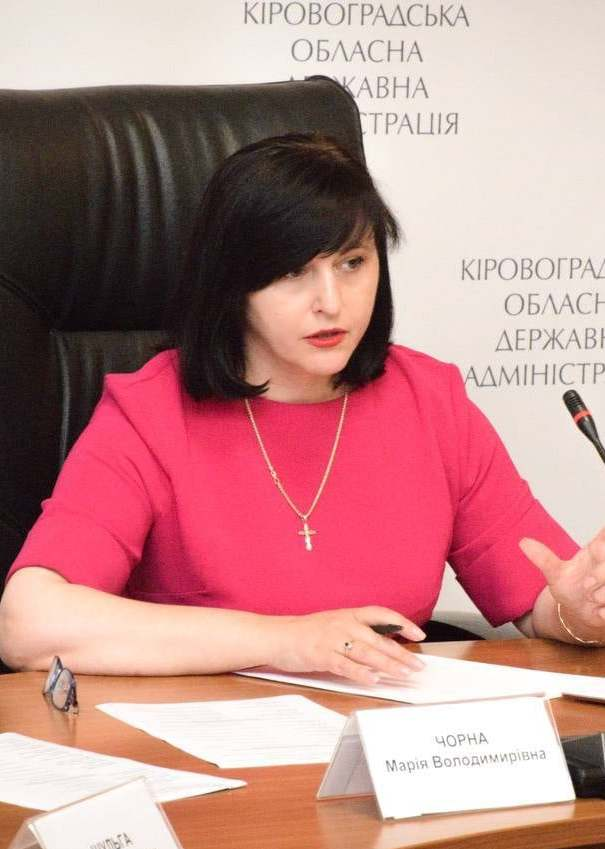

Governor of Kirovohrad Oblast
- In office 28 May 2021 – 7 March 2022
- Preceded by: Valeriy Zhaldak (acting)
- Succeeded by: Andriy Raykovych

Personal details
- Born: Mariya Volodymyrivna Chorna; 26 August 1974 (age 51) Braterske, Ukraine, Soviet Union

Mariya Volodymyrivna Chorna (Ukrainian: Марія Володимирівна Чорна; born on 26 August 1974), is a Ukrainian politician and statesman who had served as the governor of Kirovohrad Oblast from 2021 to 2022.

== Biography ==
On 27 May 2021, by decree of the President of Ukraine Volodymyr Zelenskyy, Chorna was appointed as Governor of Kirovohrad Oblast

On 7 March 2022, Chorna was dismissed as governor by President Zelenskyy, and was replaced by Andriy Raykovych.

== Family ==
She is married and has a son.
