= Volodymyr Puzakov =

Ukrainian politician

Volodymyr Tykhonovych Puzakov
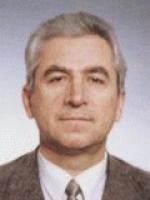

Mayor of Kirovohrad
- In office February 2007 – 31 October 2010
- Preceded by: Mykola Chyhrin
- Succeeded by: Olexander Sayinsus

Personal details
- Born: December 28, 1949 (age 76) Kuibyshev; Russian Federation
- Party: Communist Party of Ukraine

Volodymyr Tykhonovych Puzakov (Ukrainian: Володимир Тихонович Пузакóв, pronounced [woloˈdɪmɪr ˈtɪxonowɪtʃ pʊzɐˈkɔu̯]; born December 28, 1949) is a Ukrainian politician. He is a member of the Communist Party of Ukraine, a former Member of Verkhovna Rada of the 4th convocation (2002–2006), and currently holds the position of both the First Secretary of the Kirovohrad Regional Committee of the CPU and former Mayor of Kirovohrad, having been elected for the latter with much controversy in November 2006.

== Biography ==
Volodymyr Puzakov was born on December 28, 1949, in Kuibyshev (present-day Samara, Russian Federation).

- 1966–1969 – breakdown mechanic at Ukrselkhoztekhnika/Ukrsilhosptekhnika Repair Works (Kirovohrad);
- 1969–1971 – military service in Soviet Army;
- 1971–1978 – occupied various positions at Ukrselkhoztekhnika/Ukrsilhosptekhnika Repair Works (Kirovohrad);
- 1978–1983 – superior of the repair and construction unit, deputy director and the secretary of the Communist Party Committee at Ukrremtrast Repair and Engineering Works (Kirovohrad);
- 1983–1990 – occupied various positions in the regional Communist Party organizations;
- 1985 – graduated from Kirovohrad Institute of Agricultural Engineering, M. Eng.;
- 1990–1993 – the Chairman of the Executive Committee of Kirovohrad Raion Council;
- 1993–1996 – the Head of the Green Plantations Trust (Kirovohrad);
- 1996–2002 – the Head of the Board of Directors of Viktor Taratuta Repair and Engineering Works (Kirovohrad);
- May 14, 2002 – May 25, 2006 – the People's Deputy of Ukraine (Communist Party of Ukraine);
- November 2006 – October 31, 2010 elected the Mayor of Kirovohrad.

== Parliamentary years ==
In 2002 Volodymyr Puzakov took part in the Ukrainian parliamentary elections as No. 25 in the Communist party ticket and on March 31 he was elected to the Verkhovna Rada of Ukraine. In the parliament he was the member of the Communist Party of Ukraine faction and headed the Subcommittee on Securities and Stock Market within the Verkhovna Rada's Committee on Finances and Banking. As a parliamentarian Volodymyr Puzakov was among the most active people's deputies. According to official statistics during his staying in the Parliament he spoke from the rostrum 369 times and filed 334 interpellations, what correspondingly is the 3rd and the 2nd best results for the then convocation.

== See also ==
- List of mayors of Kropyvnytskyi
