= Osnova (political party) =

Political party in Ukraine

Osnova (Ukrainian: Основа, lit. 'basis') is a Ukrainian political party, founded on February 10, 2017. The head of the party is Andriy Nikolayenko. The leaders of the party are Serhiy Taruta (member of parliament), Volodymyr Polochaninov, Yaroslav Arsiriy, Kateryna Vaidych, Oleksandr Zavadetsky.

The party consists of 22 oblasts, 29 city and 52 raion party organizations.

The party's ideology is based on the principles of liberal conservatism and democracy.

== History ==
The party was founded on February 10, 2017.

On September 22, 2018, the Osnova party held a congress in Kyiv, during which 87% of the party members voted for the approval of the results of general party primaries, in which parliament member Serhiy Taruta was nominated to run for president of Ukraine in the 2019 Ukrainian presidential election.

During the congress a draft of the party platform "Nasha Osnova" (Ukrainian: Наша Основа, lit. 'Our Basis') outlined the party's main goals: security, economic development, Ukraine's role as a bridge between Europe and Asia, technological development and improving the welfare of its citizens.

On July 20, 2018, party head Andriy Nikolayenko signed a memorandum to partner with the Doctrine "Ukraine 2030" (Ukrainian: Доктрина "Україна 2030", romanized: Doktryna "Ukrayina 2030") team. Rapid development became the party's economic strategy.

On August 20, 2018, the party signed a Memorandum of Cooperation with the NGO White Tape. The cooperation was expected to unify the efforts to protect women's rights in society, in particular: support for gender initiatives, dissemination of information on violence against women and legal assistance.

On 16 March (2 weeks and one day before the election) Taruta pledged his campaign-team would support fellow 2019 presidential candidate Yulia Tymoshenko's campaign efforts. However, his name was not taken off the ballot, because 7 March was the last day when candidates could withdraw their names from the ballot. In the July 2019 Ukrainian parliamentary election Taruta was placed second on the party list of Fatherland. Head of the party Nikolayenko was placed 19th on this list. In the election Fatherland won 8.18% of the votes and 26 MPs (two elected in constituencies).

In the 2020 Ukrainian local elections the party gained 19 deputies (0.04% of all available mandates).
