= Kalchenko =

Kalchenko (Ukrainian: Кальченко) is a Ukrainian surname. Notable people with the surname include:

- Nikifor Kalchenko (1906–1989), Ukrainian and Soviet politician
- Valeriy Kalchenko (1947–2025), Ukrainian politician and a civil engineer
