= Oksana Koliada =

Ukrainian politician (born 1980)

- Оксана Коляда
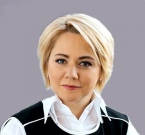

Minister of Temporarily Occupied Territories, IDPs and veterans
- In office 29 August 2019 – 4 March 2020
- President: Volodymyr Zelenskyy
- Prime Minister: Oleksiy Honcharuk
- Preceded by: Vadym Chernysh (Temporarily Occupied Territories and IDPs); Iryna Friz (Veterans Affairs)
- Succeeded by: Oleksii Reznikov (Temporarily Occupied Territories and IDPs); Serhiy Bessarab (Veterans Affairs)

Personal details
- Born: Oksana Vasylivna Koliada; 4 September 1980 (age 45) Volochysk, Khmelnytskyi Oblast, Ukrainian SSR, Soviet Union
- Education: Lviv Institute of Internal Affairs; Ivan Chernyakhovsky National Defense University of Ukraine
- Occupation: Law enforcement officer politician

Oksana Vasylivna Koliada (Ukrainian: Оксана Василівна Коляда; born 4 September 1980) is a Ukrainian law enforcement officer and politician. On 29 August 2019, she was appointed as the Minister of Temporarily Occupied Territories, IDPs and veterans.

== Biography ==
In 2002, Koliada graduated from the Lviv Institute of Internal Affairs. From 2016 to 2017, she studied at the Ivan Chernyakhovsky National Defense University of Ukraine.

From 2003 to 2015, she worked at the Ministry of the Interior.

From 2015 to 2017, Koliada served in the Armed Forces of Ukraine. She was the head of the Communications and Press Department of the Ministry of Defence.

From March 2019, she worked as Deputy Minister of Veterans Affairs.

Colonel of the Reserve.

== See also ==
- Honcharuk Government
