= Mayor of Kropyvnytskyi =

The following is a list of mayors of the city of Kropyvnytskyi, Ukraine. It includes positions equivalent to mayor, such as chairperson of the city council executive committee.

== Mayors ==
=== Before 1917 ===
- "Alexey Romanov" (Олексій Романов), 1787-1791
- Gregory Romanov (Григорій Романов), 1791-1794
- Petro Klenov (Петро Кленов), 1794-1797
- Ivan Pronin (Іван Пронін), 1797–1800
- Savin Golikov (Савин Голиков), 1800-1803
- Ivan Titov (Іван Титов), 1803-1806
- Ivan Dykov (Іван Диков), 1806-1815
- Yakim Rogalyov (Яким Рогальов), 1815-1818
- Ivan Yurievich Fundukley (Іван Юрійович Фундуклей), 1818-1819
- Ivan Areshnikov (Іван Арешников), 1819-1821
- Yakiv Stepanovych Pashutin (Яків Степанович Пашутін), 1821-1829
- Demyan Yakovlevich Samokishin (Дем'ян Якович Самокишин), 1829-1830
- Peter Shchedrin (Петро Щедрін), 1830-1831
- Ivan Kurchaninov (Іван Курчанинов), 1831-1832
- Ivan Shigartsev (Іван Шигарцев), 1832-1833
- Dmitry Shigartsev (Дмитро Шигарцев), 1833-1836
- Sidir V. Mystyushin (Сидір Васильович Мистюшин), 1836-1845
- Jacob Timofeevich Kovalev (Яків Тимофійович Ковальов), 1845-1848
- Peter Egorovich Sakharov (Петро Єгорович Сахаров), 1848-1851
- Mykola Petrovich Pashutin (Микола Петрович Пашутін), 1851-1854
- Fedor Alekseevich Makarov (Федір Олексійович Макаров), 1854-1857
- Mykola Mykytovych Makeev (Микола Микитович Макеєв), 1857-1860
- Vasily Alekseevich Vashakin (Василь Олексійович Вашакін), 1860-1863
- Mykola Petrovich Pashutin (Микола Петрович Пашутін), 1863-1864
- Ivan Mykytovych Makeev (Іван Микитович Макеєв), 1864-1866
- Samuel Konstantinovich Turchanov (Самуїл Костянтинович Турчанов), 1866-1878
- Alexander Nikolaevich Pashutin (Олександр Миколайович Пашутін), 1878–1905
- Mykola Ivanovych Ivanov (Микола Іванович Іванов), 1906-1911
- Hryhoriy Yosypovych Volokhin (Григорій Йосипович Волохін), 1912-1917

=== Since 1917 ===
- SP Kramarenko (С. П. Крамаренко), 1917-1918
- BP Volotkovsky (Б. П. Волотковський), 1918
- Vladimir Mikhailovich Sprenzhin (Володимир Михайлович Спренжин), 1918
- Ulyanov (Ульянов), 1919
- Ivan Yukhimovich Pine (Іван Юхимович Сосна), 1919
- Francevich (Францевич), 1920
- VM Strelkov (В. М. Стрелков), 1920
- Saltanov (Салтанов), 1921
- Maryanov (Мар'янов), 1921-1923
- Radchenko (Радченко), 1923-1925
- A. Manuylenko (А. Мануйленко), 1925-1926
- Тонконогий, 1926-1928
- Tryphon Markovich Gulyanytsky (Трифон Маркович Гуляницький), 1928-1929
- Mikhail Ivanovich Biryukov (Михайло Іванович Бирюков), 1929-1931
- Ivan Gavrilovich Bilyaev (Іван Гаврилович Біляєв), 1931-1932
- Dmytro Tymofiiovych Strizhak (Дмитро Тимофійович Стрижак), 1933-1935
- DI Drachuk (Д. І. Драчук), 1935-1937
- Mikhail Trokhimovich Stepanov (Михайло Трохимович Степанов), 1938-1940
- Mikhail Kuprianovich Buryanov (Михайло Купріянович Бур'янов), 1940-1941
- SK Boyko (С. К. Бойко), 1944
- Ye. O. Babenko (Є. О. Бабенко), 1944
- Nikifir Kharitonovich Lutsenko (Никифір Харитонович Луценко), 1944-1947
- Andrey Denisovich Chabanny (Андрій Денисович Чабанний), 1947-1953
- Sergey Zakharovich Sergienko (Сергій Захарович Сергієнко), 1953-1954
- Alexey Shvets (Олексій Олексійович Швець), 1954-1955
- Vladimir Makarovich Herman (Володимир Макарович Герман), 1955-1961
- Yukhim Mykytovych Kuchugurny (Юхим Микитович Кучугурний), 1961-1965
- Vladimir Makarovich Herman (Володимир Макарович Герман), 1965-1969
- Boris Karpovich Katerinchuk (Борис Карпович Катеринчук), 1969-1971
- Boris Gavrilovich Tokovy (Борис Гаврилович Токовий), 1971-1977
- Kim Mikhailovich Cherevko (Кім Михайлович Черевко), 1977-1986
- Mykola Ivanovych Moskalenko (Микола Іванович Москаленко), 1986-1989
- Mykola Petrovich Rybalchenko (Микола Петрович Рибальченко), 1989-1990
- Valery Alexandrovich Tkachenko (Валерій Олександрович Ткаченко), 1990-1991
- Vasily Georgievich Mukhin (Василь Георгійович Мухін), 1991-1998
- Alexander Vasilyevich Nikulin (Олександр Васильович Нікулін), 1998–2002
- Mykola Stanislavovych Chyhryn (Микола Станіславович Чигрін), 2002-2006
- Valeriy Kalchenko, 2006
- Volodymyr Puzakov, 2007-2010
- Alexander Dmitrovich Sainsus (Олександр Дмитрович Саінсус), 2010-2014
- Ivan Markovsky (в.о. Іван Марковський), 2014–2015
- Andriy Pavlovich Raykovych (Андрій Павлович Райкович), 2015–2022

== See also ==
- Kropyvnytskyi history
- History of Kropyvnytskyi (in Ukrainian)
