= Vadym Chernysh =

Ukrainian jurist, lawyer, and politician

- Вадим Черниш
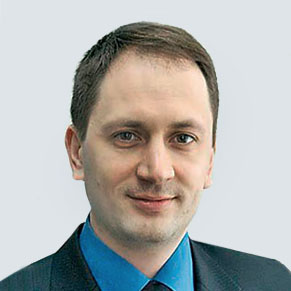

Minister of Temporarily Occupied Territories and IDPs
- In office 14 April 2016 – 29 August 2019
- President: Petro Poroshenko; Volodymyr Zelenskyy
- Prime Minister: Volodymyr Groysman
- Preceded by: post created
- Succeeded by: Oksana Koliada

Governor of Kirovohrad Oblast
- In office 3 August 2006 – 1 November 2007
- President: Viktor Yushchenko
- Preceded by: Eduard Zeinalov
- Succeeded by: Anatoliy Revenko

Personal details
- Born: October 16, 1971 (age 54) Kazanka, Kazanka Raion, Ukrainian SSR
- Education: Yaroslav the Wise Law Academy (1999)
- Occupation: Jurist, statesman

Vadym Olehovych Chernysh (Ukrainian: Вадим Олегович Черниш; born 16 October 1971) is a Ukrainian jurist, lawyer, politician and teacher.

On 26 June 2015 he was appointed as a chairman of the State Agency on issues of Donbas Restoration. He has served as Ukraine's Minister of Temporarily Occupied Territories and IDPs. He has served as the Governor of Kirovohrad Oblast from 3 August 2006 to 1 November 2007.

== Biography ==
Vadym Chernysh, Minister for Temporarily Occupied Territories and IDPs of Ukraine (2016-2019), PhD in law, certified expert on Anti-Money Laundering and Counter Terrorism Financing He has many years of experience in the banking sector, worked as a lawyer, a specialist in banking security.

In the period from 1998 till 2000, he taught legal disciplines. For about 15 years he was engaged in advocacy activities, was a Deputy of Kirovohrad Regional Council. He was a Head of the Kirovohrad Regional State Administration in 2006–2007.

He was a member of the National Security and Defence Council of Ukraine in 2007.

In 2008, he became vice-president of the Kirovohrad Regional Center of Public Information and Socio-Political Studies. And in 2012 he founded the Center for Security Studies (CENSS), which he headed for several years.

From June 2015 till April 2016, Vadym Chernysh served as Head of the State Agency of Ukraine for Donbas Recovery.

From April 14, 2016, till August 29, 2019, he was Minister for Temporarily Occupied Territories and Internally Displaced Persons.

In 2009 and 2010, Vadym Chernysh completed a training and internship course on anti-money laundering and counter terrorism financing in the United States and received the relevant certificate from the Association of Certified Anti-Money Laundering Specialists. Since 2010, he has been a member of the Association of Certified Anti-Money Laundering Specialists – ACAMS, USA.

In the period from 2015 till 2016, he was a negotiator in the Minsk process for the peaceful settlement of the situation in the East of Ukraine (Trilateral Contact Group ).

Over the past 5 years, he has paid special attention to security issues, global competition between states, hybrid warfare (including information, economic, political spheres), formation and realization of state policy on conflict resolution and peacebuilding.

He has been a speaker at international conferences and forums, including: Aspen Security Forum (Aspen Institute, USA), Oslo Forum (Norway), Stockholm Forum on Peace and Development (SIPRI, Sweden), Fragility Forum (World Bank, USA) and others.

Vadym Chernysh holds a PhD in law, his thesis work is devoted to the issues of administrative and legal bases of control over the activities of intelligence agencies of Ukraine.

He teaches the author's course "National Security" for master's students in "Public Administration" and "Conflict Resolution and Mediation".

Vadym Chernysh is a Head of the Governing Council of Center for Security Studies "CENSS".
