= Eduard Zeinalov =

Ukrainian politician (born 1963)

- Едуард Зейналов
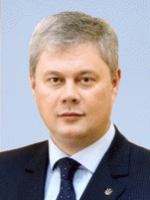

Member of the Verkhovna Rada
- In office 23 November 2007 – 12 December 2012

Member of the Verkhovna Rada
- In office 25 May 2006 – 8 June 2007

Governor of Kirovohrad Oblast
- In office 4 February 2005 – 3 May 2006
- Preceded by: Vasyl Kompaniets
- Succeeded by: Anatoliy Revenko (acting)

Personal details
- Born: Eduard Dzhanhirovych Zeinalov; 21 July 1963 (age 63) Oleksandriia, Ukraine, Soviet Union

Eduard Dzhanhirovych Zeinalov (Ukrainian: Едуард Джангірович Зейналов) (born 21 July 1963) is a Ukrainian politician. He was an authorized representative in Kirovohrad Oblast for the presidential candidate Viktor Yushchenko.

== Early life ==
Zeinalov was born on 21 July 1963 in the village of Oleksandriia, which was then part of the Ukrainian SSR in the Soviet Union. After graduating from the Odesa Maritime Academy in 1985 with a specialty as a technician-operator, he started working as a sailor for the Ooleksandriia Rescue Station. He then became an operator at the Kirovohrad oil transshipment base, and was then Head of the Department of Planning for the Kirovohrad Oblast Directorate of Derzhkomnaftoprodukt in the Ukrainian SSR. Afterwords, he became head of external economic relationns at Kirovohradholovpostach, eventually rising to the rank of First Deputy Head of the Board there. His final positions before transitioning into politics was being General Director of Interresursy and CJSC RUR Group S.A., and he also graduated from the Interregional Academy of Personnel Management.

== Political career ==
In February 2004, he was appointed Governor of Kirovohrad Oblast, which he did for two years until 2006. After his departure from the post, he was elected a People's Deputy of Ukraine in the Verkhovna Rada during the 2006 Ukrainian parliamentary election as a member of the Our Ukraine bloc. He resigned early on 8 June 2007 during the 2007 Ukrainian political crisis, alongside many Our Ukraine deputies, but was re-elected to be a People's Deputy again during the snap 2007 Ukrainian parliamentary election.
