= Governor of Kirovohrad Oblast =

Chief executive of Kirovohrad Oblast, Ukraine

- Seal of Kirovohrad Oblast

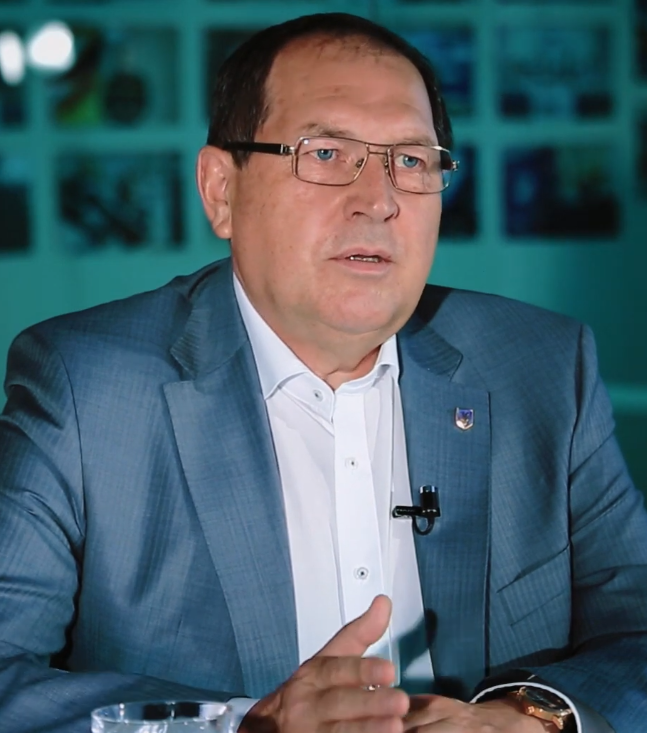
- Incumbent; Andriy Raykovych since 7 March 2022
- Residence: Kropyvnytskyi
- Term length: Four years
- Inaugural holder: Mykola Sukhomlyn
- Formation: 1992 as Presidential representative
- Website: Government of Kirovohrad Oblast

The governor of Kirovohrad Oblast is the head of executive branch for the Kirovohrad Oblast.

The office of governor is an appointed position, with officeholders being appointed by the president of Ukraine, on recommendation from the prime minister of Ukraine, to serve a four-year term.

The official residence for the governor is located in Kropyvnytskyi.

== Governors ==
- Mykola Sukhomlyn (1992–1994, as the Presidential representative)
- Mykola Sukhomlyn (1995–1996, as the Governor)
- Mykhailo Hromovyi (1996–1998)
- Mykhailo Bashkirov (1998–1999, died in office)
- Valeriy Kalchenko (1999)
- Vasyl Motsnyi (1999–2003)
- Mykhailo Chernovol (2003–2004)
- Vasyl Kompaniets (2004–2005)
- Eduard Zeinalov (2005–2006)
- Anatoliy Revenko (2006, acting)
- Vadym Chernysh (2006–2007)
- Anatoliy Revenko (2007, acting)
- Vasyl Motsnyi (2007–2009)
- Svitlana Nehoda (2009, acting)
- Volodymyr Movchan (2009–2010)
- Serhiy Larin (2010–2013)
- Andriy Nikolayenko (2013–2014)
- Oleksandr Petik (2014)
- Serhiy Kuzmenko (2014–2019)
- Serhiy Kovalenko (2019, acting)
- Svitlana Lobanova (2019, acting)
- Andriy Balon (2019–2020)
- Andrii Nazarenko (2020–2021)
- Valerii Zhaldak (since 15 April 2021, acting)
- Mariya Chorna (2021-2022)
- Andriy Raykovych (2022-)

== Sources ==
- World Statesmen.org
