= Serhiy Taruta =

Ukrainian parliamentarian

Serhii Taruta
- Сергій Тарута
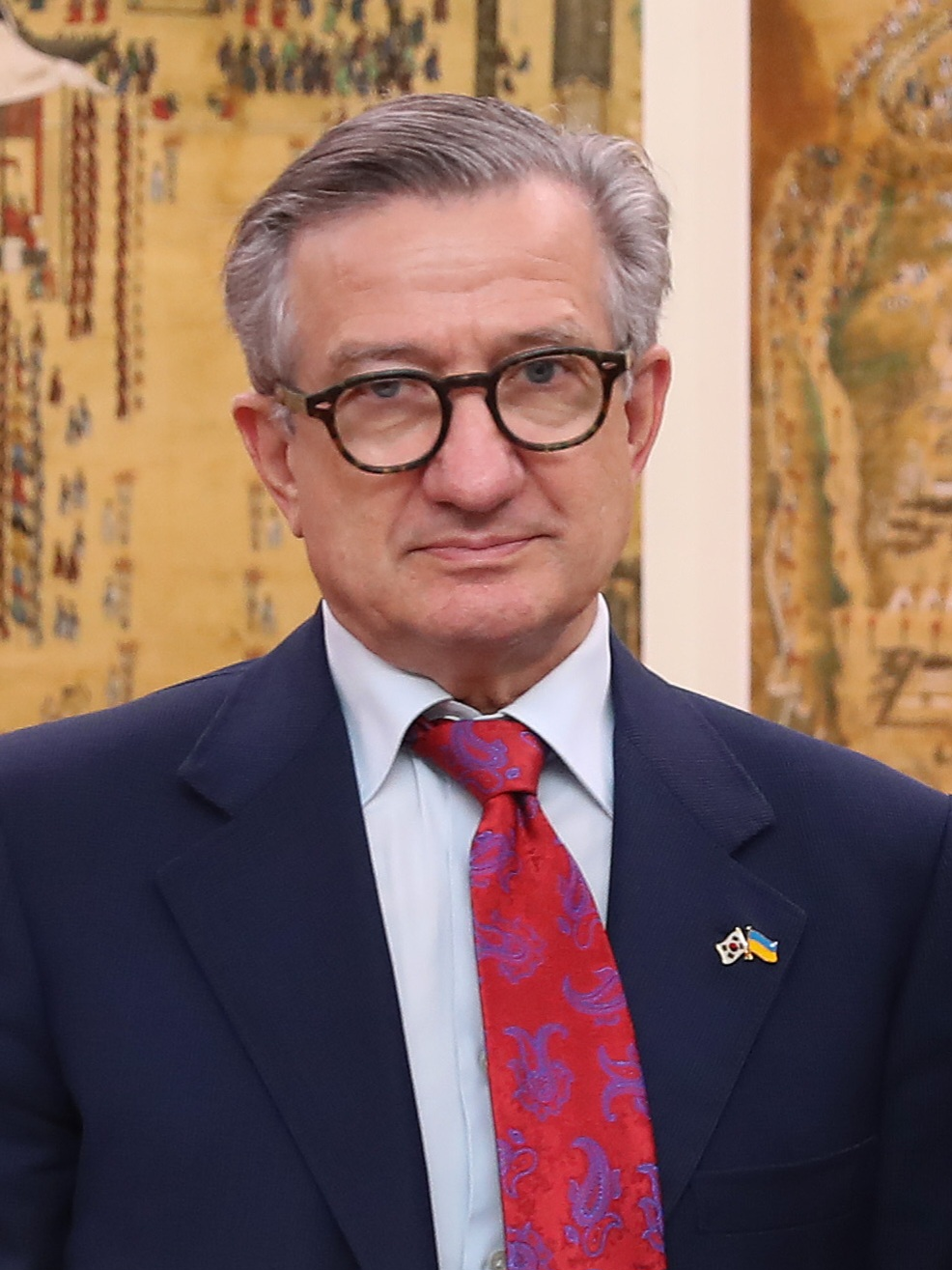
- Taruta in 2022

Governor of Donetsk Oblast
- In office 2 March – 10 October 2014
- Preceded by: Andriy Shyshatskiy
- Succeeded by: Oleksandr Kikhtenko

People's Deputy of Ukraine

9th convocation
- Incumbent
- Assumed office 29 August 2019

8th convocation
- In office 27 November 2014 – 29 August 2019

Personal details
- Born: Serhii Olexiiovych Taruta; 22 July 1955 (age 71) Vynohradne, Mariupol, Donetsk Oblast, Ukrainian SSR
- Citizenship: Ukrainian
- Party: Batkivshchyna
- Education: Donetsk State University of Management

Serhii Olexiiovych Taruta (Ukrainian: Сергій Олексійович Тарута; born 22 July 1955) is a Ukrainian politician and current member of the Ukrainian parliament, former businessman and founder of Industrial Union of Donbas, former President of FC Metalurh Donetsk, and the former governor of Donetsk Oblast.

== Biography ==
Serhii Taruta was born in Mariupol in 1955 and was a successful cyclist in his youth; he later claimed that he rode an average of 120 kilometres a day. He studied at Pryazovskyi State Technical University before going on to work at the large Ukrainian metal plant, Azovstal.

== Business career ==
In 1995, Serhii Taruta left Azovstal for "Azovintex", a foreign trade company he co-founded. In December, 1995 he was appointed the CEO of the Industrial Union of Donbass Corporation (ISD Corporation), which he co-founded. Between 2001 and 2014, Taruta served as the Chairman of the Board of ISD Corporation.

According to Forbes magazine, he ranked among the richest people in the world, with his estimated wealth being over 2.7 billion US dollars (2008).

== Political career ==
In 1998 and 2002 Serhii Taruta was elected a member of the Donetsk Regional City Council for Telmanovsky electoral district, Donetsk Region.

On 2 March 2014, amidst the 2014 pro-Russian conflict in Ukraine, acting President Olexander Turchynov appointed Taruta Governor of Donetsk Oblast. On 10 October 2014, President Petro Poroshenko removed him from office, replacing him with Oleksandr Kikhtenko.

In the 2014 Ukrainian parliamentary election, as an independent candidate Taruta won a single-member district in Mariupol with 60.00% of the vote and is thus a member of the Ukrainian parliament since 27 November 2014.

Taruta leads the Group for Inter-parliamentary Ties between Ukraine and Germany.

He is also the Head of the Sub-Committee for Protection of Historic and Cultural Heritage of the Parliamentary Committee for Culture and Spiritual Affairs.

Taruta is the co-chair of the Parliamentary Platform for the Future of Donbass, a body that aims to develop new legislative initiatives to help solve problems related to the reintegration of occupied territories of the region.

He is the author of the Three Pillars peace plan for Donbass, and also proposed the creation of the Vienna Format for Donbass peace talks.

Taruta led the group of developers of Sustainable Development Doctrine Ukraine 2030.

Serhii Taruta is a founder of the political party "Osnova".

On 22 September 2018, Osnova nominated Taruta as the party's candidate for the 2019 Ukrainian presidential election. On 16 March (2 weeks and one day before the election) Taruta pledged his campaign-team would support fellow candidate Yulia Tymoshenko's campaign efforts. However, his name was not taken of the ballot. (7 March was the last day when candidates could withdraw their names from the ballot.)

In the July 2019 Ukrainian parliamentary election Taruta was placed second on the party list of Fatherland. He was elected to parliament.

== Private life ==
Serhii Taruta is married with two daughters.

Taruta is a prolific antiquities' collector.

== Honours ==
Serhii Taruta was conferred the Order for the Service to Homeland of III (2006) and II degrees (2009), as well as the Order of St. Ann, II degree.
