= Proposition (political party) =

Proposition Пропозиція
- Chairman: Andriy Pylchenko
- Founded: 19 June 2020
- Headquarters: Dnipro
- Ideology: Regionalism
- Colours: Red; Blue; Grey
- Verkhovna Rada: 0 / 450
- Regions (2020): 35 / 1,780

Website
- proposition.org.ua

Proposition (Ukrainian: Пропозиція, pronounced [propoˈzɪts⁽ʲ⁾ijɐ]) is a Ukrainian political party founded in 2020 by the mayors of six major cities: Borys Filatov of Dnipro, Andriy Raykovych of Kropyvnytskyi, Oleksiy Kaspruk of Chernivtsi, Oleksandr Senkevych of Mykolaiv, Andriy Dyachenko of Kakhovka, and Serhii Sukhomlyn of Zhytomyr. The party has been nicknamed the "Party of Mayors".

== History ==
The Proposition party is the successor to the New European Ukraine political party, which was registered in December 2014. The New European Ukraine party did not take part in the 2015 Ukrainian local elections, nor in the 2019 Ukrainian parliamentary elections. The party's name was changed to Proposition in April 2020 when Andry Pylchenko from Dnipro became its new leader. Pylchenko was a former member of the political council of the party UKROP. In the 2015 Ukrainian local elections, Borys Filatov was elected mayor of Dnipro as a UKROP representative.

The six mayors presented Proposition to the public on 19 June 2020, and a party congress was planned for July 2020. Other mayors, "leaders of public opinion", and other local government officials were invited to join the meeting. The founding mayors claimed they did not need a new political party to achieve re-election and that their own new local parties was sufficient. However, Proposition was created because the six Mayors were unsatisfied with the level of cooperation with the Presidential Office, president Volodymyr Zelenskyy, and prime minister Denys Shmyhal. The first task of the new party was to win the October 2020 Ukrainian local elections. The founders stated that the party also intends to take part in the 2023 Ukrainian parliamentary election. According to the results published by the Central Election Commission of Ukraine in the 2020 local elections, 1.66% of local deputies elected were members of the Proposition party. In Dnipropetrovsk Oblast, the party was one of the winners of the election.
