= Kirovohrad Oblast Council =

Legislature of Kirovohrad Oblast, Ukraine

Type
- Type: Unicameral
- Houses: 1

Leadership
- Speaker: Serhii Shulga

Structure
- Seats: 64
- Political groups: 15 Fatherland; 14 Servant of the People; 11 Opposition Platform — For Life; 9 European Solidarity; 5 For the Future; 5 Proposition; 5 Radical Party

Elections
- Last election: 25 October 2020

Meeting place
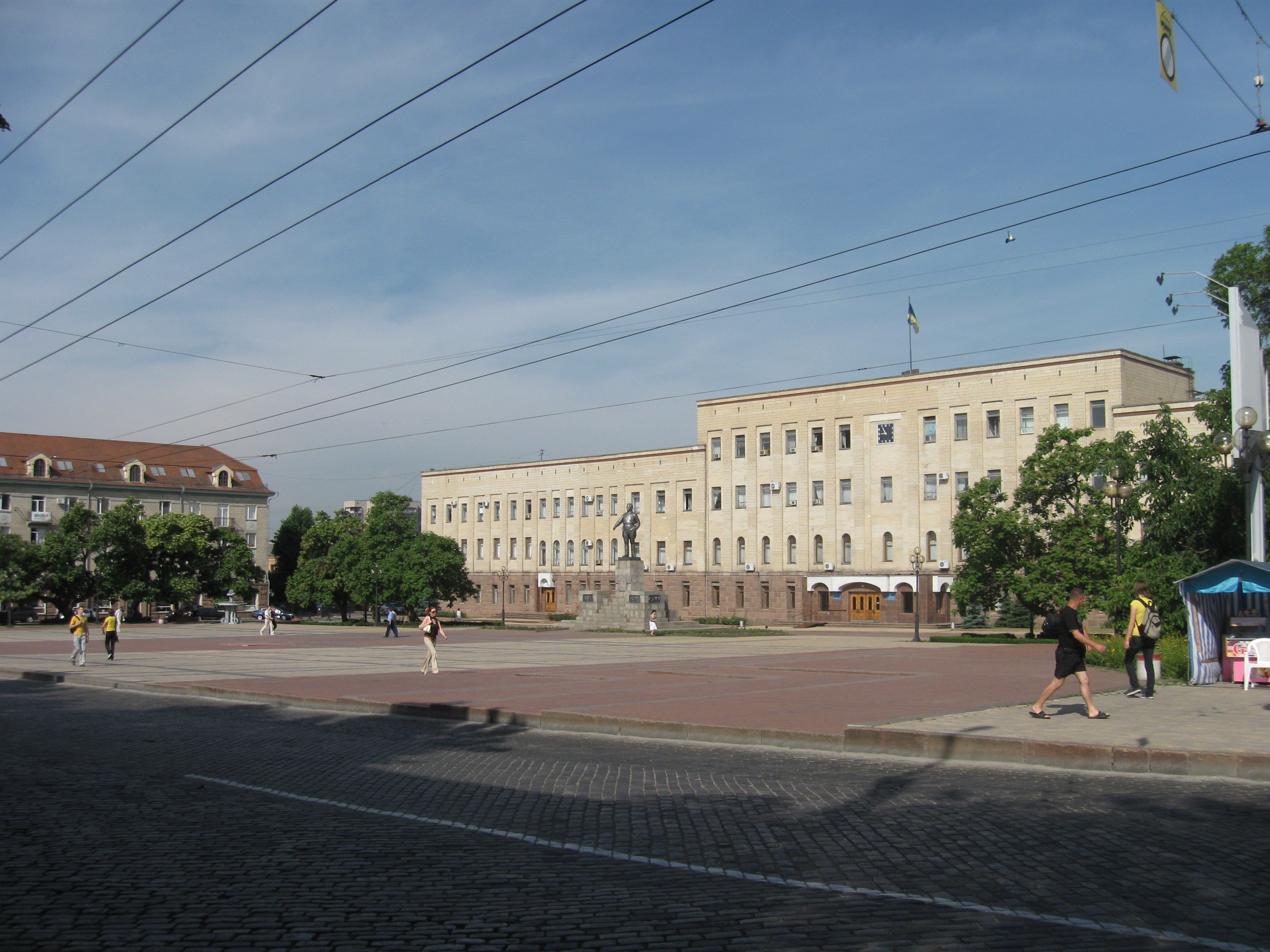
- Kropyvnytskyi, Kirovohrad Oblast

Website
- https://oblrada.kr.ua/

The Kirovohrad Oblast Council (Ukrainian: Кіровоградська обласна рада) is the regional oblast council (parliament) of the Kirovohrad Oblast (province) located in central Ukraine.

Council members are elected for five year terms. In order to gain representation in the council, a party must gain more than 5 percent of the total vote.

== Recent elections ==
=== 2020 ===
Distribution of seats after the 2020 Ukrainian local elections

- 15 Fatherland
- 14 Servant of the People
- 11 Opposition Platform — For Life
- 9 European Solidarity
- 5 For the Future
- 5 Proposition
- 5 Radical Party

Election date was 25 October 2020

=== 2015 ===
Distribution of seats after the 2015 Ukrainian local elections

- 14 Solidarity
- 14 Fatherland
- 13 Opposition Bloc
- 6 Radical Party
- 5 UKROP
- 4 Self Reliance
- 4 Svoboda
- 4 Our Land

Election date was 25 October 2015

== Chairmen ==
=== Regional executive committee ===
- Vitaly Ishchenko (1939–1941, 1943–1949)
- Vasily Komyakhov (1949–1953)
- Grigory Turbay (1953–1963)
- Leonid Kravchenko (1963–1964, industrial)
- Grigory Turbay (1963–1964, agrarian)
- Nikolai Kirichenko (1964–1965)
- Pyotr Koshevsky (1965–1973)
- Dmitry Maksimenko (1973–1980)
- Volodymyr Zheliba (1980–1990)
- Mykola Sukhomlyn (1990–1991)

=== Regional council ===
- Volodymyr Zheliba (1991–1992)
- Mykola Sukhomlyn (1992)
- Volodymyr Dolynyak (1992–1994)
- Mykola Sukhomlyn (1994–1999)
- Vasyl Sibirtsev (1999–2006)
- Mykola Sukhomlyn (2006–2010)
- Mykola Kovalchuk (2010–2014)
- Oleksandr Chornoivanenko (2014–2020)
- Serhiy Shulga (since 2020)
