= Andriy Raykovych =

Ukrainian politician (born 1956)

- Андрій Райкович
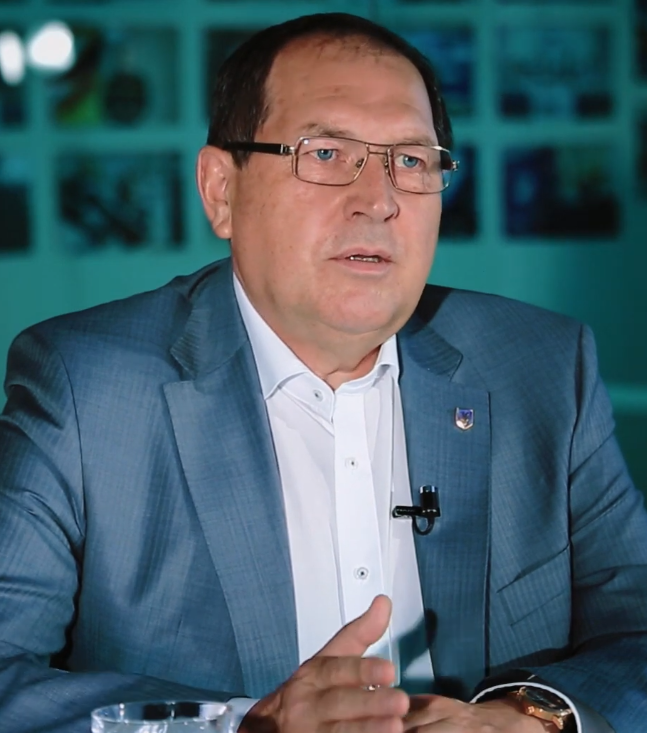
- Raykovych in 2020

Governor of Kirovohrad Oblast
- Incumbent
- Assumed office 7 March 2022
- Preceded by: Mariya Chorna

Mayor of Kropyvnytskyi
- In office 27 November 2015 – 7 March 2022
- Preceded by: Ivan Markovsky

Member of the Kirovohrad Oblast Council
- In office 2006 – 27 November 2015

Personal details
- Born: 7 April 1956 (age 70) Tallinn, then part of Estonian SSR, Soviet Union

Andriy Pavlovych Raykovych (Ukrainian: Андрій Павлович Райкович; born 7 April 1956) is a Ukrainian politician who has been governor of Kirovohrad Oblast since 7 March 2022. He had served as the mayor of Kropyvnytskyi from 2015 to 2022.

== Biography ==
Raykovych was born on 7 April 1956 in Soviet-occupied Tallinn, Estonia. His paternal grandfather comes from the village of Berezovka, Dolynska Raion (now part of the Kropyvnytskyi Raion of Ukraine). He participated in World War I, until repressed in 1937. Andriy's father, Pavlo, is a participant in World War II, who remained after the end of the war to serve in Tallinn. In Estonia, he met his future wife, who was according to the Soviet nationality law Russian by nationality. (All citizens of the USSR were also citizens of an SSR (Soviet Socialist Republic), and all citizens of the SSRs were also citizens of the USSR.) After the end of his service, his father worked as a crankshaft grinder, and his mother worked as a kindergarten teacher. Later, the family moved to the city of Dolynska, where Andriy graduated from high school.

He began his career in 1977, becoming an electrician at the Budindustriya plant in Kirovohrad. After that, he served in the Soviet army for two years. In 1982, he graduated from the Kirovohrad Institute of Agricultural Engineering with a degree in power supply for industrial enterprises.

From 1979 to 1986, he was an engineer at the Dolynska Poultry Plant, where over time he was appointed instructor of the Dolynska District Committee of the Communist Party of Ukraine. In 1986, he became the head of the Dolynska bakery plant, and in 1988, the Dolinsky poultry plant.

Between 1990 and 2004, he was a director and then chairman of the board of the open joint-stock company Poultry Plant in Kirovohrad. In 1992, he became the owner of the Yatran Meat Processing Plant.

In 1997, he became one of the co-founders of the Kirovograd regional branch of the People's Party of Ukraine. In the 1998 parliamentary elections, Raykovych ran on the list of the People's Party (No. 175), but was not elected. Four years later, he again unsuccessfully ran for the Ukrainian national parliament Verkhovna Rada from the bloc "For United Ukraine!".

In the 2006 Ukrainian local elections, he became a member of the Kirovohrad Oblast Council of the 5th convocation. In the same year, he unsuccessfully ran in the 2006 Ukrainian parliamentary election.

In the early parliamentary elections of the following year, Raykovych was also included in the list of the People's Party, but was not again elected.

In the 2010 Ukrainian local elections, he was reelected as a member of the Kirovohrad Oblast Council. He was a member of the standing committee on budget, financial activities and socio-economic development.

In September 2011, he became the General Director of the Yatran Meat Processing Plant.

In the elections the mayor of Kirovohrad in 2015, Raykovych ran for the Petro Poroshenko Bloc party and was elected in the second round, gaining 48.6% of the vote. He was sworn to office on 27 November. The city was renamed to Kropyvnytskyi in 2016.

During the 2020 local elections, Raykovych once again decided to run for the mayor's seat, running from the Proposition party. According to the results of the first round of elections, he received 53.53% of the votes.

On 7 March 2022, by decree of the President of Ukraine Volodymyr Zelenskyy, Raykovych was appointed Governor of Kirovohrad Oblast.
