= Okrugs of the Ukrainian Soviet Socialist Republic =

Ukrainian SSR's administrative entity

Okrugs of the Ukrainian SSR
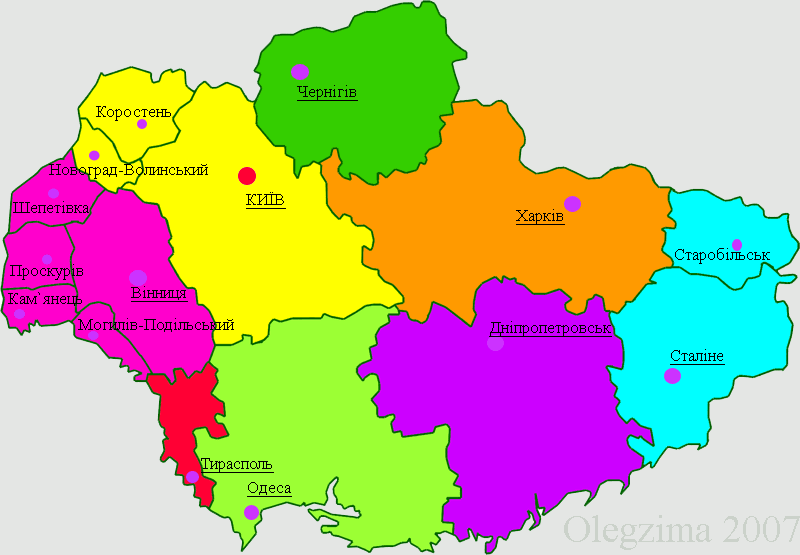
- Administrative division of Ukraine in 1932–1937.
- Category: Subdivision of an oblast
- Location: Ukrainian SSR
- Created: 1933–1938
- Number: 7 (1 initially) (as of 1937)
- Subdivisions: raions (districts)

An okrug (Russian: округ) or okruha (Ukrainian: округа) is one of a series of special administrative divisions of the Ukrainian Soviet Socialist Republic that were part of three oblasts and existed from 1933 to 1937 (some to 1938). Most of them were border administrative units that existed along the western border of the Soviet Union.

== List of okrugs ==
Most of okrugs existed within the Vinnytsia Oblast. Special agricultural okrug centered in Starobilsk existed within the Donetsk Oblast. The border okrugs from 1935 to 1937, while the Starobilsk okrug existed in 1933–1938.

=== Vinnytsia Oblast ===
- Kamianets-Podilsky Okrug
- Mohyliv-Podilsky Okrug
- Proskuriv Okrug
- Shepetivka Okrug

=== Kiev Oblast ===
- Korosten Okrug
- Novohrad-Volynsky Okrug

=== Donetsk Oblast ===
- Starobilsk Okrug
