= Valeriy Kalchenko =

Ukrainian politician (1947–2025)

- Валерій Кальченко
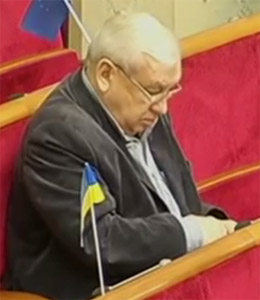
- Kalchenko in 2014

Minister on matters of Emergencies and population security from consequences of the Chernobyl Disaster
- In office 1996–1999
- Prime Minister: Valeriy Pustovoitenko; Pavlo Lazarenko
- Preceded by: Volodymyr Kholosha
- Succeeded by: Vasyl Durdynets

Personal details
- Born: 24 February 1947 Kirovohrad, Ukrainian SSR, USSR
- Died: 22 February 2025 (aged 77) Kropyvnytskyi, Ukraine
- Party: Batkivshchyna

Valeriy Mykhailovych Kalchenko (Ukrainian: Валерій Михайлович Кальченко; 24 February 1947 – 22 February 2025) was a Ukrainian politician and a civil engineer. He was appointed Minister of Emergency Situations.

== Education ==
From 1963 to 1967, he studied at Kirovohrad Construction College, and from 1970 to 1976 at the Odesa Civil Engineering Institute, majoring in Industrial and Civil Engineering, civil engineer.

== Career ==
November 1967 – November 1969 – service in the army.

January 1970 – August 1974 – design engineer, leading designer, chief project engineer of the integrated design department of the Ukrainian Design and Technology Institute “Ukrsilhosptekhproekt” in Kirovograd.

August 1974 – November 1979 – Chief Engineer of the Intercollective Farm Capital Construction Department of the Kirovohrad Regional Department of Agriculture.

November 1979 – December 1985 – Chief Engineer, Head of Construction Department No. 19 of the Prombud Trust in Mikun, Komi ASSR.

January 1986 – April 1990 – Chief Engineer of the Kirovohradoblagrobud Association.

April 1990 – April 1992 – Deputy Chairman of the Kirovohrad Regional Executive Committee.

April 1992 – July 1994 – Deputy Chairman of the Kirovograd Regional State Administration.

July 1994 – August 1995 – Deputy Chairman of the Kirovograd Regional Council.

August 1995 – August 1996 – First Deputy Head of the Kirovohrad Regional State Administration.

31 August 1996 – 8 February 1999 – Minister of Ukraine for Emergencies and Protection of the Population from the Consequences of the Chernobyl Disaster, member of the National Security and Defense Council of Ukraine (from August 1997 to November 1999).

8 February 1999 – 3 November 1999 – Head of the Kirovohrad Regional State Administration.

February–August 2000 – Deputy Head of the Trade and Economic Mission at the Embassy of Ukraine in the Russian Federation.

June–September 2005 – Deputy Minister of Ukraine for Emergencies and Protection of the Population from the Consequences of the Chernobyl Disaster.

April–May 2006 – Mayor of Kirovograd.

Member of the Commission on Nuclear Policy and Environmental Safety under the President of Ukraine (December 1997 – July 2000). Trustee of the candidate for the post of President of Ukraine Viktor Yushchenko in TEC 101 (2004–2005).

== Death ==
Kalchenko died on 22 February 2025, two days short of his 78th birthday.

== Awards ==
- Order of Merit, 3d class (August 1998)
- Order of Merit, 2nd class (October 1999)
- Order of Merit, 1st class (December 2011; refused award)

== See also ==
- List of mayors of Kropyvnytskyi
