= Kirovohrad Oblast =

Oblast (region) of Ukraine

Kirovohrad Oblast Кіровоградська область
- Oblast
- Kirovohradska oblast
- Flag Coat of arms
- Nickname: Кіровоградщина (Kirovohradshchyna)
- Coordinates: 48.46°N 32.27°E
- Country: Ukraine
- Established: 10 January 1939
- Administrative center: Kropyvnytskyi

Government
  - Governor: Andriy Raykovych
  - Oblast council: 64 seats
  - Chairperson: Yuriy Drozd (Servant of the People)

Area
  - Total: 24,588 km^{2} (9,493 sq mi)
  - Rank: Ranked 15th

Population (2022)
  - Total: 903,712 ▼
  - Rank: Ranked 25th
  - Density: 36.754/km^{2} (95.193/sq mi)

GDP
  - Total: ₴ 100 billion (€2.6 billion)
  - Per capita: ₴ 109,183 (€2,800)
- Time zone: UTC+2 (EET)
  - Summer (DST): UTC+3 (EEST)
- Postal code: 25000-27999
- Area code: +380-52
- ISO 3166 code: UA-35
- Vehicle registration: ВA
- Raions: 4
- Cities: 12
- Settlements: 26
- Villages: 1015
- HDI (2022): 0.727 high
- FIPS 10-4: UP10
- NUTS statistical regions of Ukraine: UA33
- Website: kr-admin.gov.ua

Kirovohrad Oblast (Ukrainian: Кіровоградська область, romanized: Kirovohradska oblast), also known as Kirovohradshchyna (Ukrainian: Кіровоградщина), is an oblast (province) in central Ukraine. The administrative center of the oblast is the city of Kropyvnytskyi. The oblast's population is 903,712 (2022 estimate). It is Ukraine's second least populated oblast, ahead of Chernivtsi.

In 2019, the Constitutional Court of Ukraine approved the change of the oblast's name to Kropyvnytskyi Oblast (Ukrainian: Кропивницька область, romanized: Kropyvnytska oblast, unofficially Kropyvnychchyna (Ukrainian: Кропивниччина)). The change is not yet implemented. The largest cities of the region are Kropyvnytskyi, Oleksandriia, Znamianka and Svitlovodsk.

== Geography ==
The area of the province is 24,600 square kilometres (9,500 sq mi).

The city of Dobrovelychkivka is the geographical center of Ukraine.

Most of the region is located within historic Right-bank Ukraine and Zaporizhzhia, and the western outskirts are part of historic Podolia.

== History ==
The lands of the modern Kirovohrad Oblast were first inhabited by Scythians. In the Middle Ages, during the time of Kyivan Rus', the East Slavic tribe of Ulichis lived here. After the liberation of the former Kyivan Rus' from the Tatars in the Battle of Blue Waters and the unification of the principalities of Kyiv, Pereyaslav, and Chernihiv with the Grand Duchy of Lithuania, there was a need to protect the southeastern borders from attacks by the Crimean Khanate, a remanent steppe horde formed after the collapse of the Golden Horde at the end of the 15th century. For this, Dmytro Vyshnevetsky founded the first Zaporozhian Sich on the island of Khortytsia, thus the Ukrainian Cossacs appeared. On the territory of the modern Kirovohrad region the Zaporozhians founded many villages. From 1569, the territory formed part of the Kingdom of Poland within the Polish–Lithuanian Commonwealth.

These lands were under the rule of the Ukrainian Cossacks of Hetmanate and Zaporozhian Sich from XV to XVIII century.

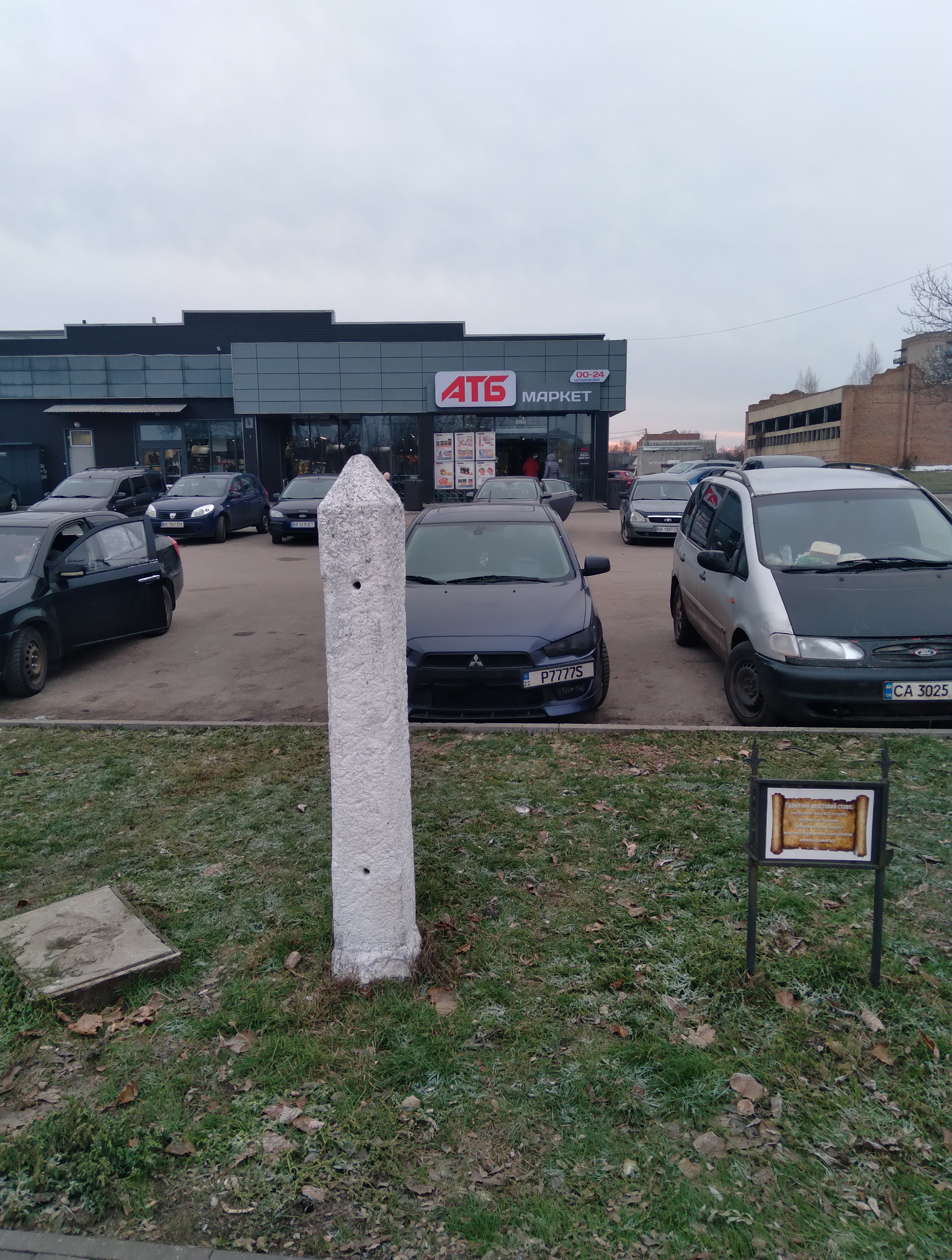
One of the unique granite columns with which the Cossacks marked their territory

As a result of the destruction of the Cossacks and the serfdom imposed by the Russian government at the end of the 18th century, these lands came under the direct power of Russia. In 1752, the territory of New Serbia was founded with the capital in Novomyrhorod.

In the 1800s, majority of the landed was owned by the noble Skarżyński family. They played a large role in the development of the region. An emphasis was placed on the development of its agriculture and the Skarzynskis opened a school in Migeya dedicated to this.

The oblast was created as part of the Ukrainian SSR on January 10, 1939 out of the northern raions of Mykolaiv Oblast. Before establishment, its territory was part of Kherson Governorate (most of it) and Podolia Governorate (smaller portion) until 1925. Earlier before occupation of Ukraine in 1920s, in 1918 there were plans to introduce own Ukrainian administrative territorial division with territory of modern Kirovohrad Oblast being split between lands of Nyz (Lower land), Pobozhia (Boh land), and Cherkasy.

During the Soviet repressions, over 40,000 residents of the region were killed.

During World War II, the oblast was under Nazi occupation from 1941 to 1944 and was liberated as a result of Kirovograd offensive.

In 1954, the oblast lost some raions to the newly created Cherkasy Oblast, but later that year received its western raions from the Odesa Oblast.

Between 1939 and 2016, the oblast administrative center, Kropyvnytskyi, was called Kirovohrad and was named after the First Secretary of the Leningrad City Committee of the All-Union Communist Party (Bolsheviks) Sergei Kirov. Due to decommunization laws (on 14 July 2016) the name of the city was changed to Kropyvnytskyi. Kirovohrad Oblast was not renamed because as such it is mentioned in the Constitution of Ukraine, and the Oblast can only be renamed by a constitutional amendment by the Verkhovna Rada.

On 20 June 2018, the Committee on State Building, Regional Policy and Local Self-Government of the Ukrainian parliament backed the proposal to rename Kirovohrad Oblast to Kropyvnytskyi Oblast. In February 2019, the Constitutional Court of Ukraine declared constitutional the bill on renaming Kirovohrad Oblast to Kropyvnytskyi Oblast. The renaming was supported by the local Oblast Council in March 2021. The process then stalled in the parliament, with the oblast council asking the Verkhovna Rada to speed up the process in September 2022. In August 2025, the Director of the Ukrainian Institute of National Memory Oleksandr Alfiorov said that the changes to the Constitution are planned for both Kirovohrad and Dnipropetrovsk Oblasts, but can be implemented only after martial law is lifted.

== Demographics ==
According to the 2001 Ukrainian census, ethnic Ukrainians accounted for 90.1% of the population of Kirovohrad Oblast, and ethnic Russians for 7.5%.

=== Language ===
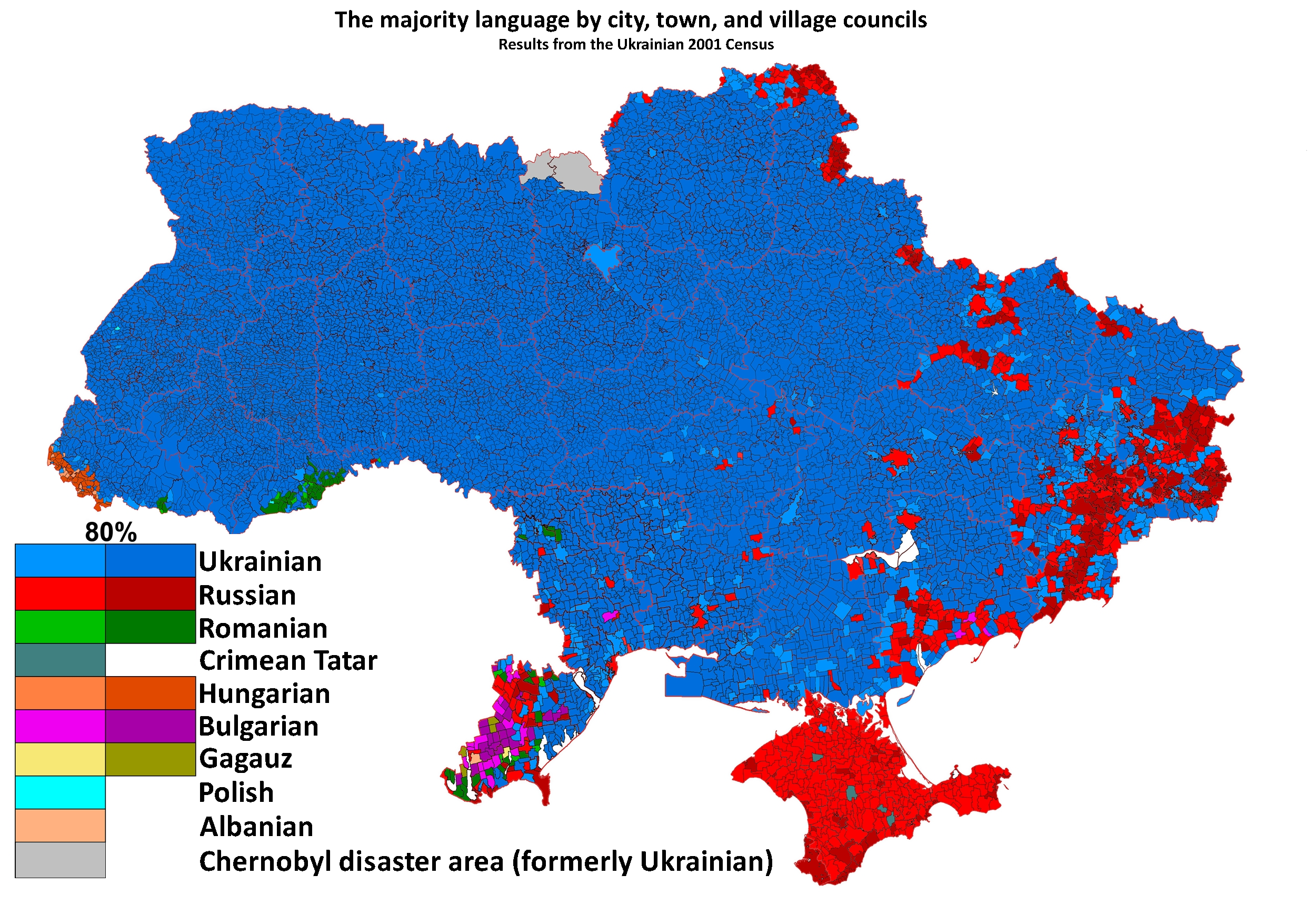
According to the 2001 Ukrainian census, Ukrainian was the native language for almost 89% of Kirovohrad Oblast's population: it was the dominant language in all of the city and town councils, as well as in the absolute majority of the village councils of the oblast. Russian was the dominant language in six village councils, in five of which the Ukrainian-speaking minority constituted over 20% of the population. All of the predominantly Russian-speaking village councils were completely surrounded by the predominantly Ukrainian-speaking ones.

Due to the Russification of Ukraine during the Soviet era, the share of Ukrainian speakers in the population of Kirovohrad Oblast gradually decreased between the 1970 and 1989 censuses, while the share of Russian speakers increased. Native language of the population of Kirovohrad Oblast according to the results of population censuses:

	1959	1970	1989	2001
Ukrainian	86.9%	87.4%	83.3%	88.9%
Russian	10.7%	11.4%	15.1%	10.0%
Other	2.4%	1.2%	1.6%	1.1%

Native language of the population of the raions and city councils of Kirovohrad Oblast according to the 2001 Ukrainian census:

	Ukrainian	Russian
Kirovohrad Oblast	88.9%	10.0%
Kropyvnytskyi (city council)	79.7%	19.6%
Oleksandriia (city council)	87.0%	12.5%
Znamianka (city council)	79.1%	19.9%
Svitlovodsk (city council)	79.5%	20.0%
Blahovishchenske Raion	97.1%	1.7%
Bobrynets Raion	96.2%	2.3%
Vilshanka Raion	92.7%	2.5%
Haivoron Raion	96.5%	2.9%
Holovanivsk Raion (in pre-2020 borders)	95.6%	3.7%
Dobrovelychkivka Raion	95.3%	3.2%
Dolynska Raion	94.4%	4.6%
Znamianka Raion	93.3%	5.1%
Kompaniivka Raion	95.5%	2.5%
Kropyvnytskyi Raion (in pre-2020 borders)	87.9%	10.4%
Mala Vyska Raion	89.3%	9.6%
Novhorodka Raion	97.1%	2.1%
Novoarkhanhelsk Raion	97.0%	1.9%
Novomyrhorod Raion	95.2%	2.5%
Novoukrainka Raion (in pre-2020 borders)	95.3%	2.7%
Oleksandriia Raion (in pre-2020 borders)	95.0%	3.8%
Oleksandrivka Raion	96.8%	2.3%
Onufriivka Raion	86.3%	12.9%
Petrove Raion	93.6%	5.3%
Svitlovodsk Raion	85.9%	12.9%
Ustynivka Raion	95.6%	2.3%

Ukrainian is the only official language on the whole territory of Kirovohrad Oblast.

According to a poll conducted by Rating from 16 November to 10 December 2018 as part of the project «Portraits of Regions», 70% of the residents of Kirovohrad Oblast believed that the Ukrainian language should be the only state language on the entire territory of Ukraine. 13% believed that Ukrainian should be the only state language, while Russian should be the second official language in some regions of the country. 11% believed that Russian should become the second state language of the country. 6% found it difficult to answer.

On 23 December 2021, Kirovohrad Oblast Council approved the «Programme for the Development and Functioning of the Ukrainian Language in Kirovohrad Oblast for 2022—2027», the main objective of which is to strengthen the positions of the Ukrainian language in various spheres of public life in the oblast.

According to a survey «Is the language question (ir)relevant?» (Ukrainian: «Мова (не) на часі?»), which took place in Kirovohrad Oblast from 12 to 22 October 2023, 96.7% of respondents named Ukrainian as their mother tongue, while 2.6% named Russian as their mother tongue. In everyday life, 66.4% of respondents spoke Ukrainian, 29.4% spoke a mix of Ukrainian and Russian, and 3.4% spoke Russian.

According to the research of the Content Analysis Centre, conducted from 15 August to 15 September 2024, the topic of which was the ratio of Ukrainian and Russian languages in the Ukrainian segment of social media, 80.4% of posts from Kirovohrad Oblast were written in Ukrainian (77.0% in 2023, 70.2% in 2022, 21.1% in 2020), while 19.6% were written in Russian (23.0% in 2023, 29.8% in 2022, 78.9% in 2020).

After Ukraine declared independence in 1991, Kirovohrad Oblast, as well as Ukraine as a whole, experienced a gradual Ukrainization of the education system, which had been Russified during the Soviet era. Dynamics of the ratio of the languages of instruction in general secondary education institutions in Kirovohrad Oblast:

Language of instruction, % of pupils	1991— 1992	1992— 1993	1993— 1994	1994— 1995	1995— 1996	2000— 2001	2005— 2006	2007— 2008	2010— 2011	2012— 2013	2015— 2016	2018— 2019	2021— 2022	2022— 2023
Ukrainian	62.2%	65.3%	69.0%	72.0%	75.0%	89.0%	96.0%	97.0%	98.0%	98.0%	98.0%	99.0%	99.24%	100.0%
Russian	37.8%	34.7%	31.0%	28.0%	25.0%	11.0%	4.0%	3.0%	2.0%	2.0%	2.0%	1.0%	0.76%	—

According to the State Statistics Service of Ukraine, in the 2023—2024 school year, all 93,403 pupils in general secondary education institutions in Kirovohrad Oblast were studying in classes where Ukrainian was the language of instruction.

=== Age structure ===
0–14 years: 14.3% ▲ (male 72,646/female 68,970)
15–64 years: 68.7% ▼ (male 324,698/female 355,058)
65 years and over: 17.0% (male 55,718/female 111,666) (2013 official)

=== Median age ===
total: 41.2 years ▲
male: 37.7 years ▲
female: 44.5 years ▲ (2013 official)

== Points of interest ==
The following sites were nominated for the Seven Wonders of Ukraine:

- Khutir Nadiia, outskirts of Mykolaivka village

The oblast also has a number of archaeological sites, such as Nebelivka site and Melgunov Kurgan.

== Administrative divisions ==
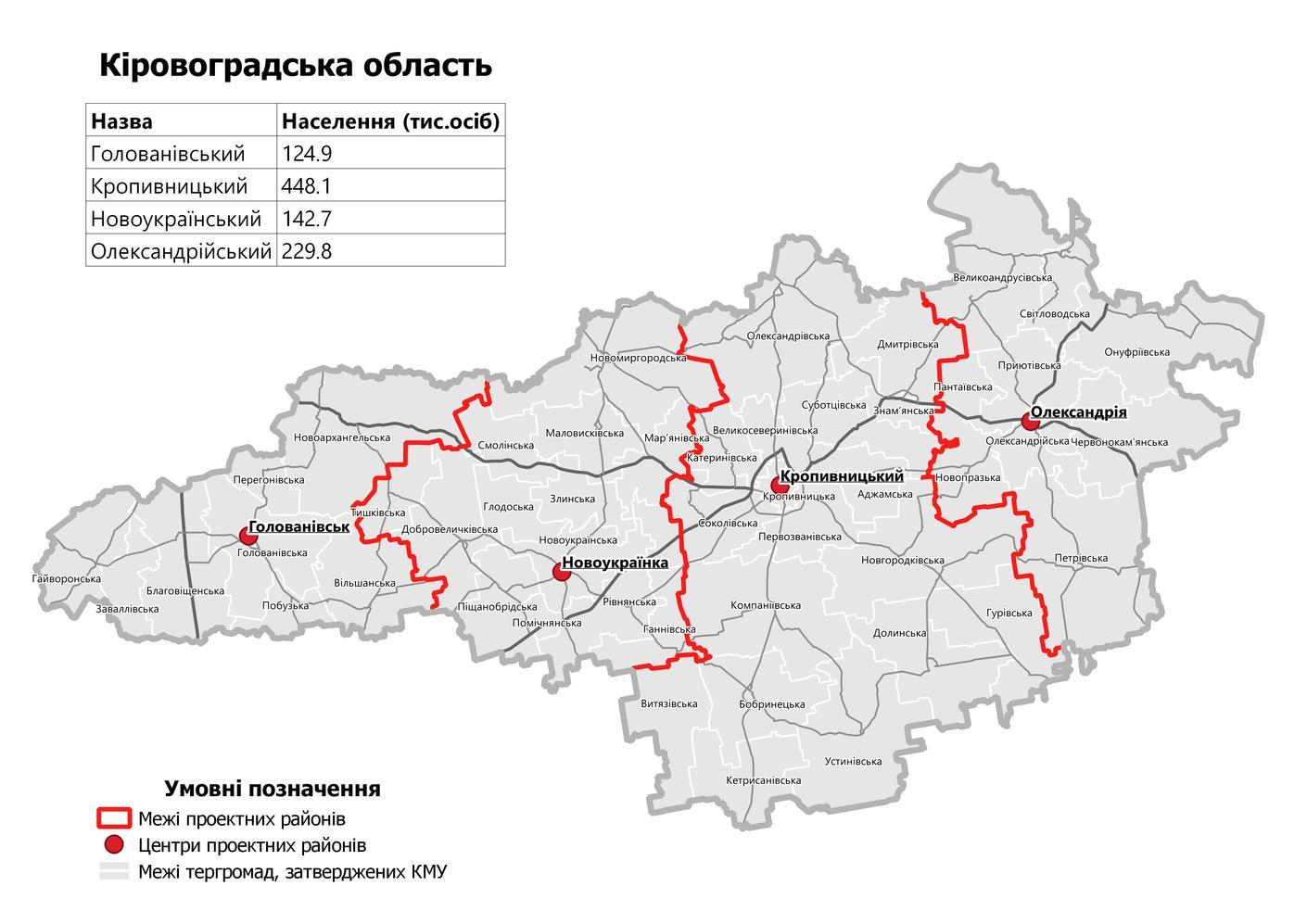
Raions of Kirovohrad Oblast as of August 2020.

Kirovohrad Oblast
As of January 1, 2022
Number of districts (райони)	4
Number of hromadas (громади)	49

Raions
No.	Name	Coat of arms	Population, (2020).	Area, km²	Density, per km²	Administrative center	Map	Subdivisions
1	Holovanivsk		122,952	4,244	28.97	Holovanivsk		10 hromadas
2	Kropyvnytskyi		442,997	9,709	45.62	Kropyvnytskyi		17 hromadas
3	Novoukrainka		140,539	5,196	27	Novoukrainka		13 hromadas
4	Oleksandriia		226,721	5,405	41.94	Oleksandriia		9 hromadas

Before the July 2020 reform, Kirovohrad Oblast was administratively subdivided into 21 raions (districts) as well as 4 cities (municipalities) which were directly subordinate to the oblast government: Oleksandriia, Svitlovodsk, Znamianka, and the administrative center of the oblast, Kropyvnytskyi.

== Nomenclature ==
Most of Ukraine's oblasts are named after their capital cities, officially referred to as "oblast centers" (Ukrainian: обласний центр, translit. oblasnyi tsentr). The name of each oblast is a relative adjective, formed by adding a feminine suffix to the name of the respective center city: Kirovohrad was the former name of the center of the Kirovohrads’ka oblast’ (Kirovohrad Oblast). Most oblasts are also sometimes referred to in a feminine noun form, following the convention of traditional regional place names, ending with the suffix "-shchyna", as is the case with the Kirovohrad Oblast, Kirovohradshchyna.

== Gallery ==
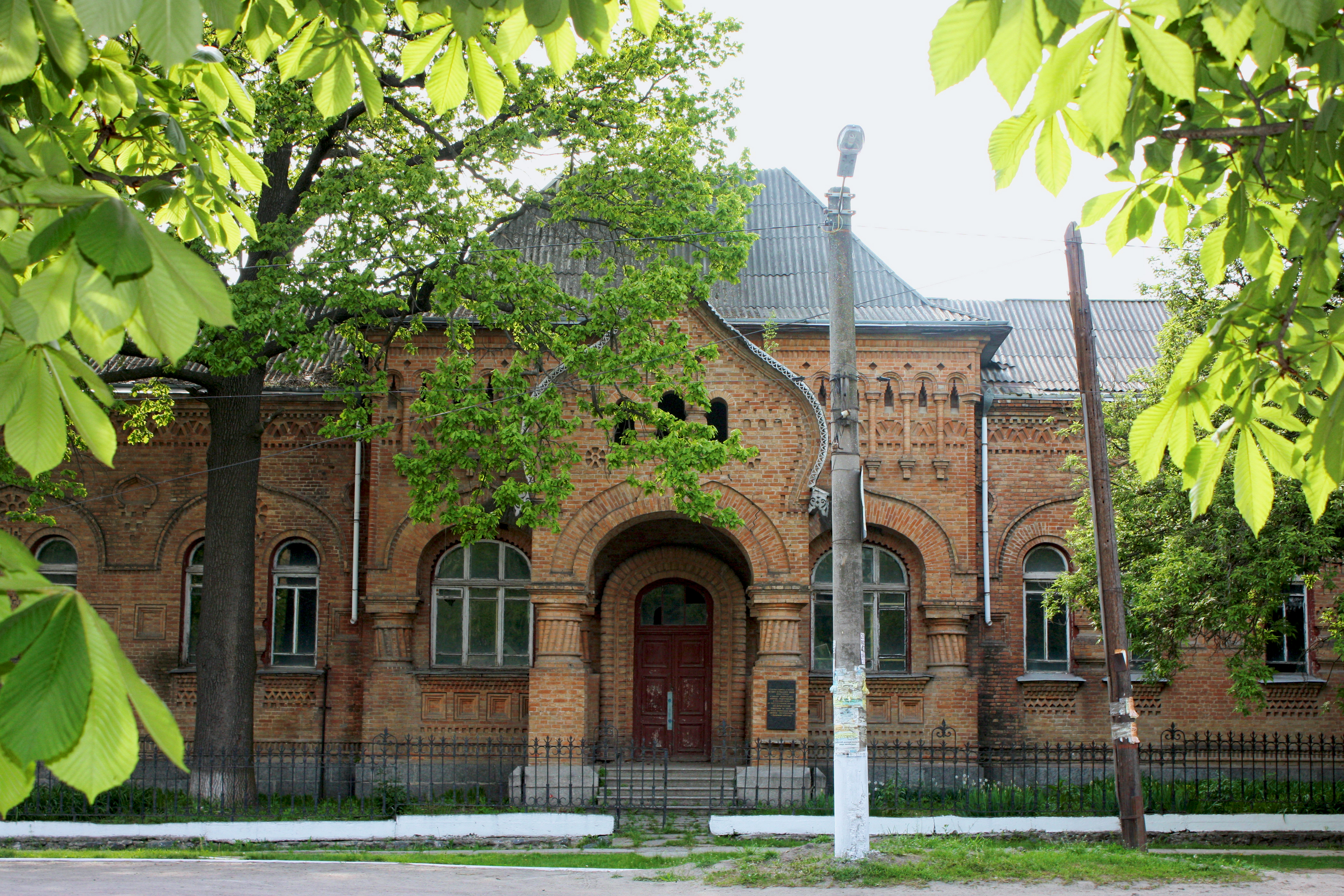
Hospital in Novomyrhorod

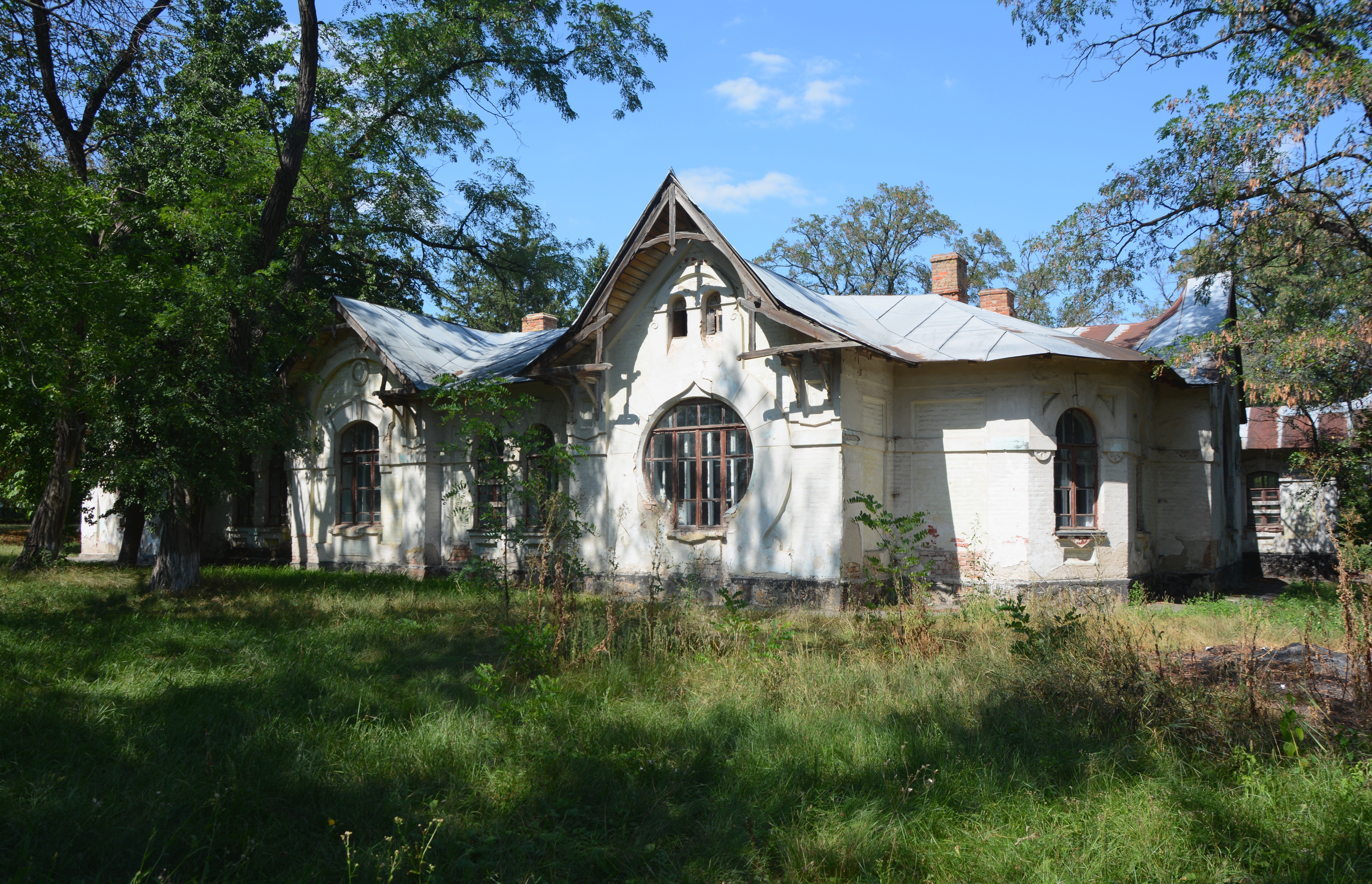
Former hospital in Nova Praha

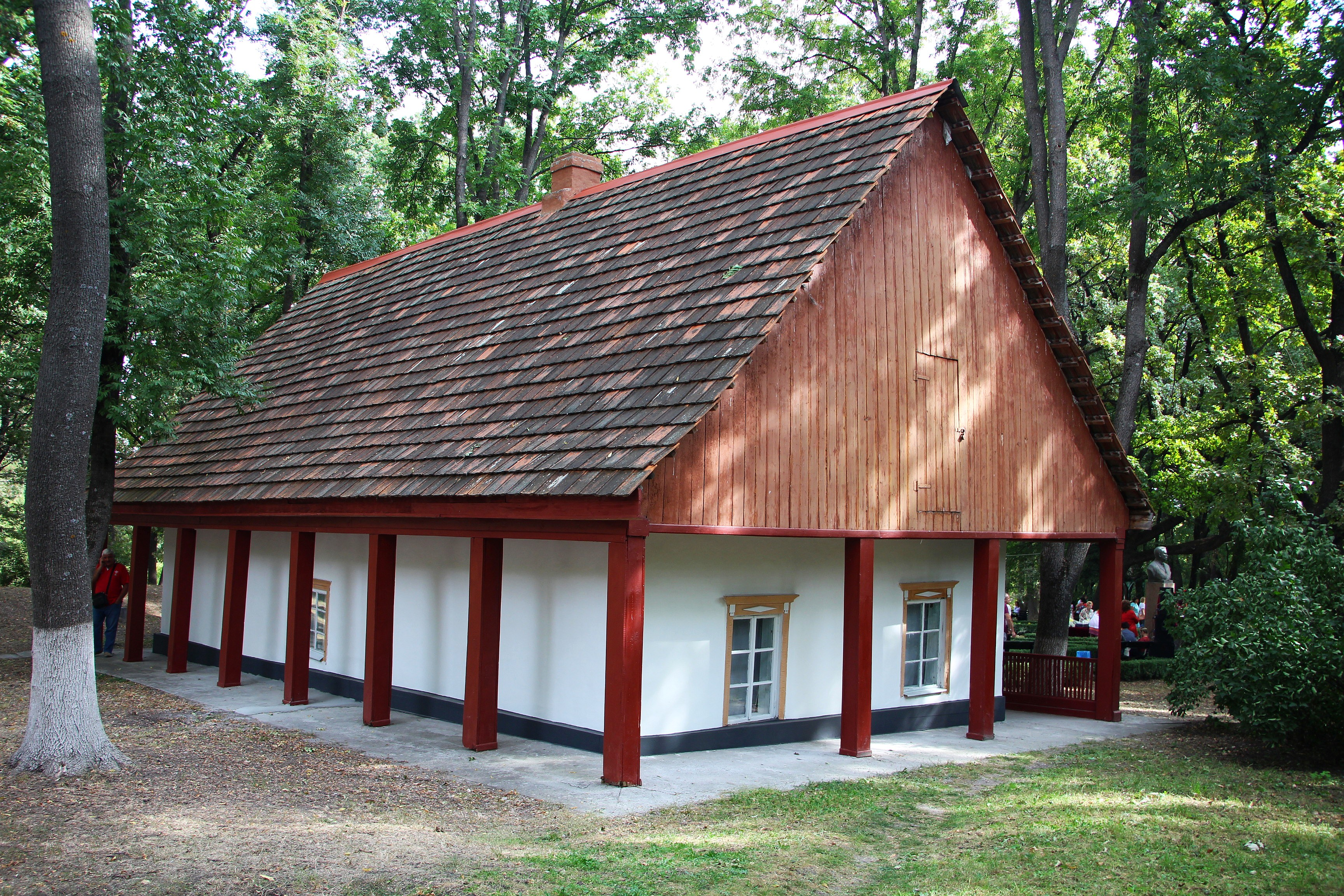
Khutir Nadiia museum

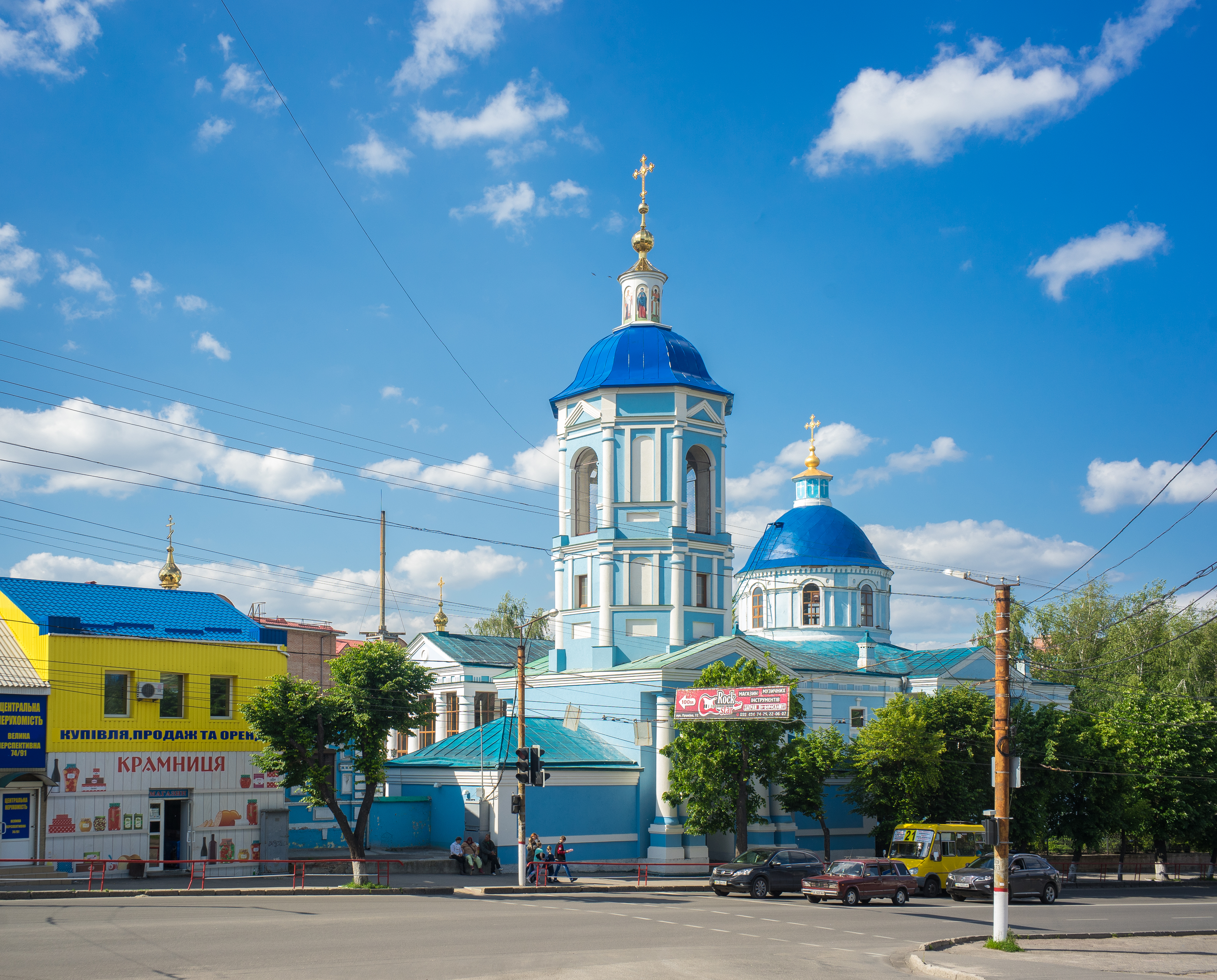
Cathedral of Nativity of Mary in Kropyvnytskyi

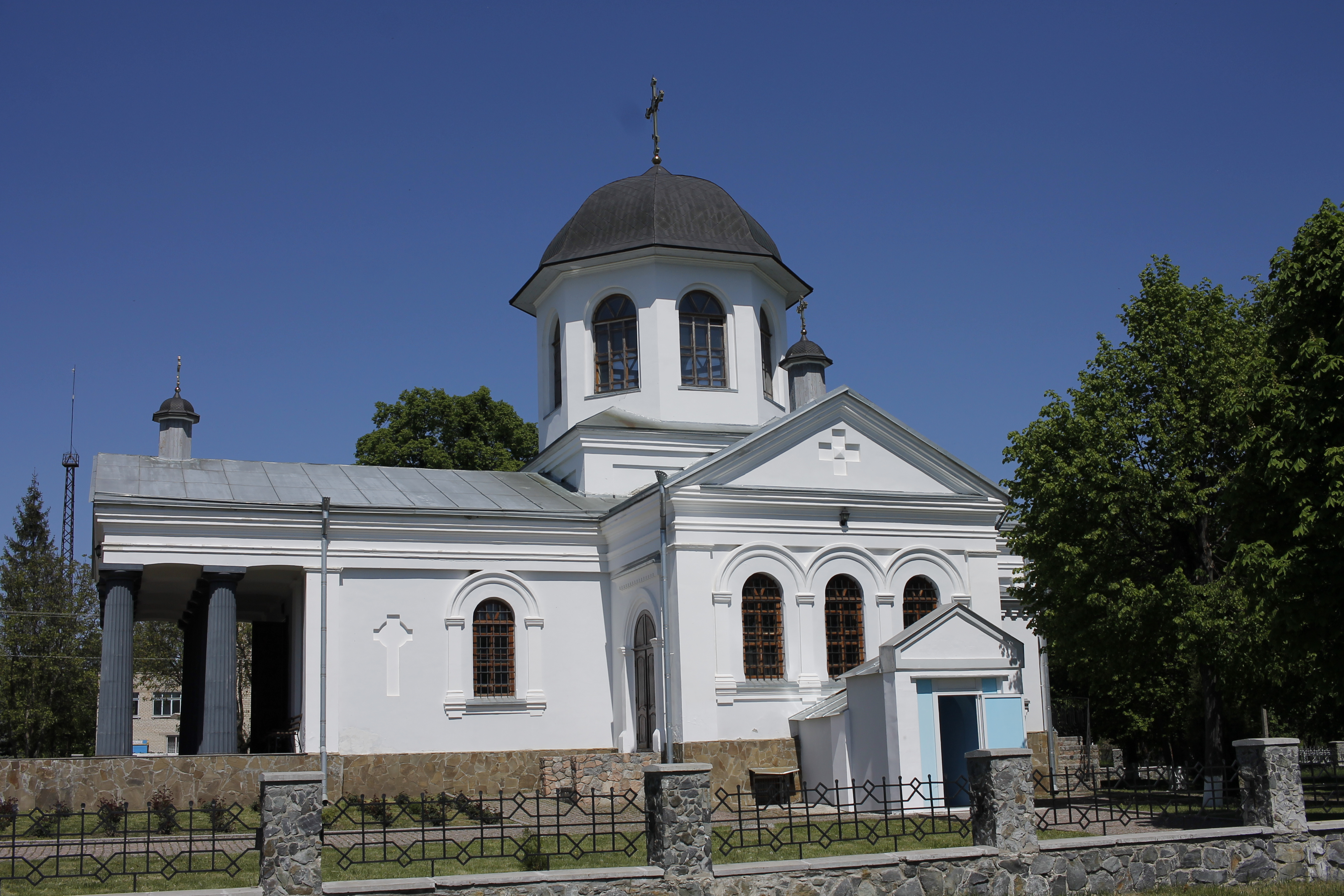
Exaltation of the Holy Cross Church, Rozumivka

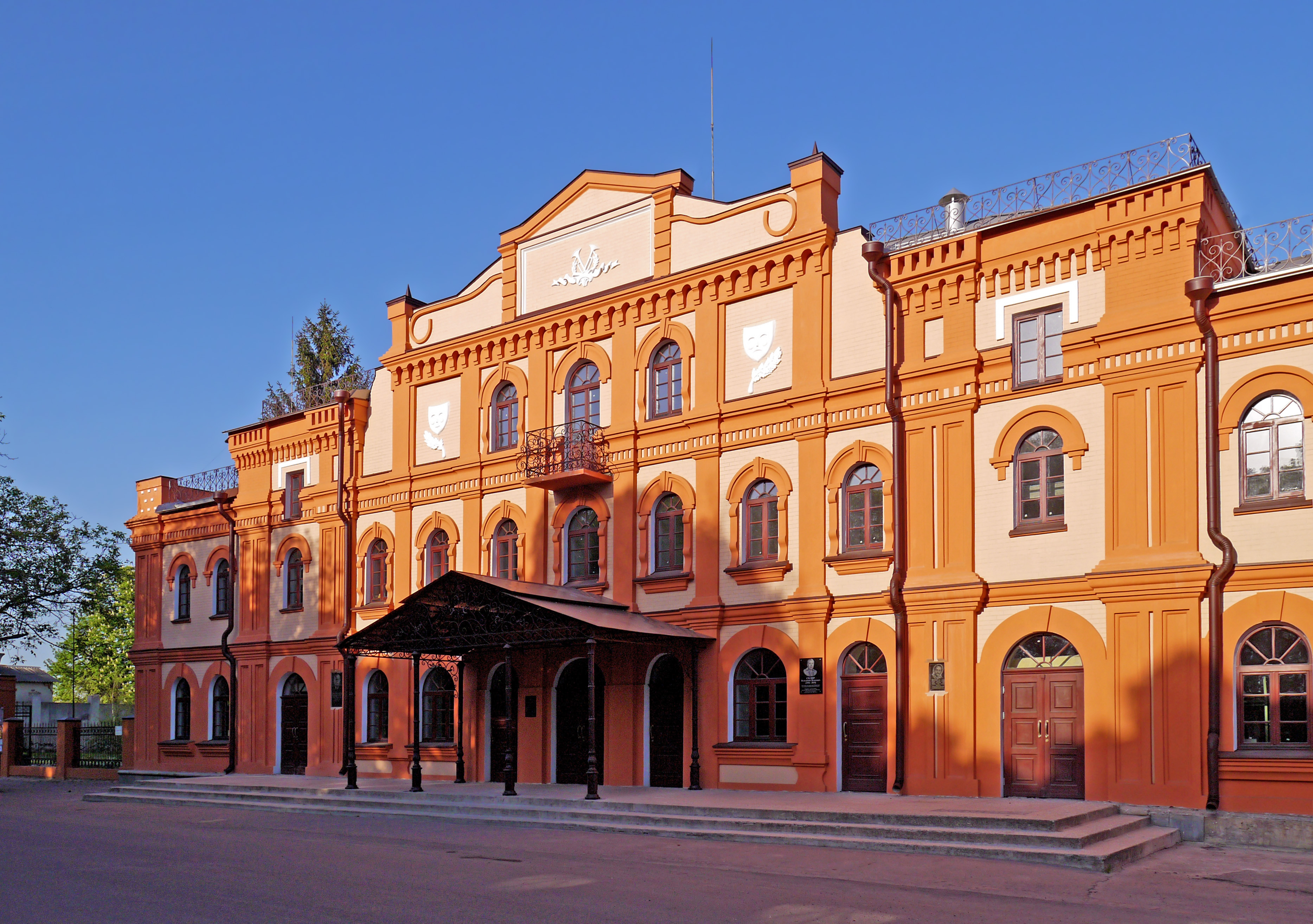
Theater in Oleksandriia

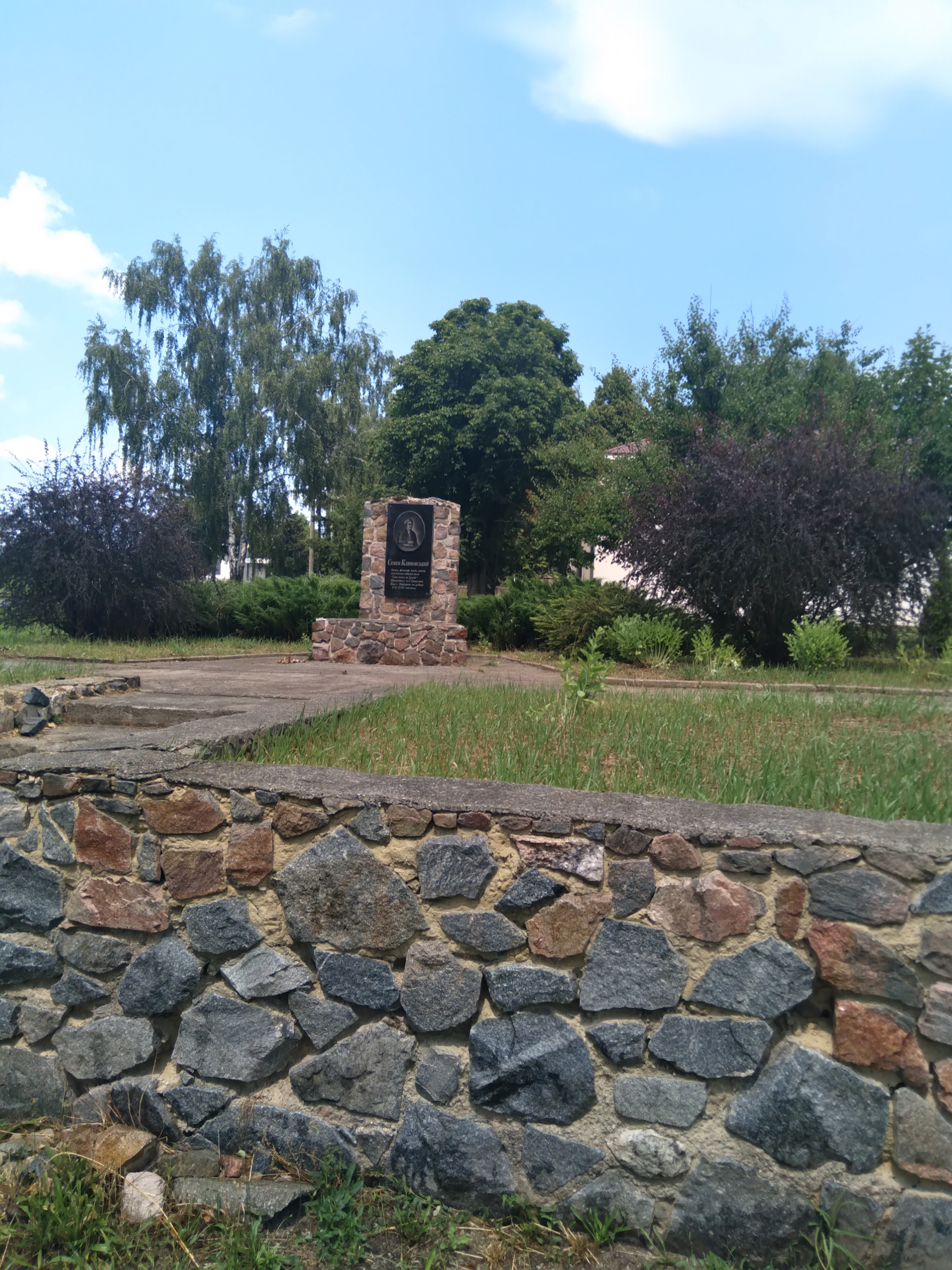
Memorial to Semen Klymovsky in Moshoryne

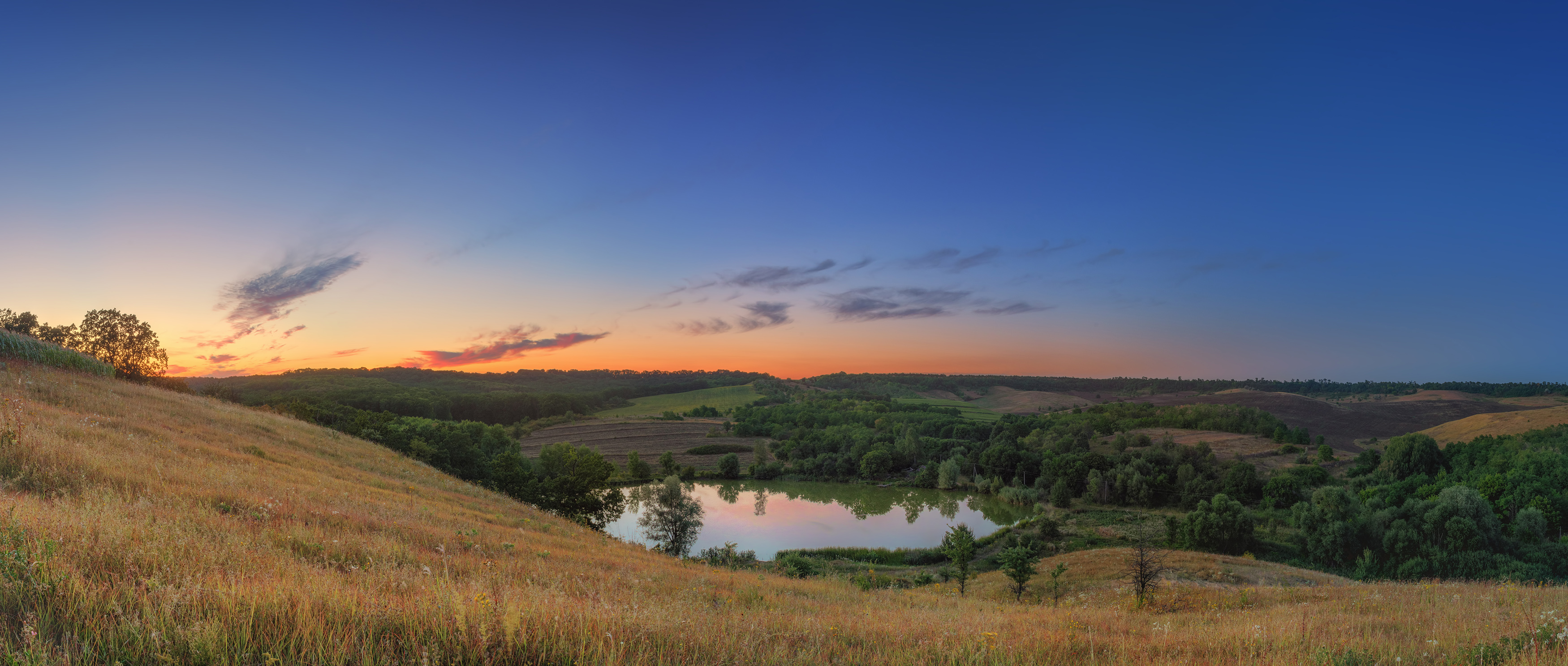
Near Inhul River

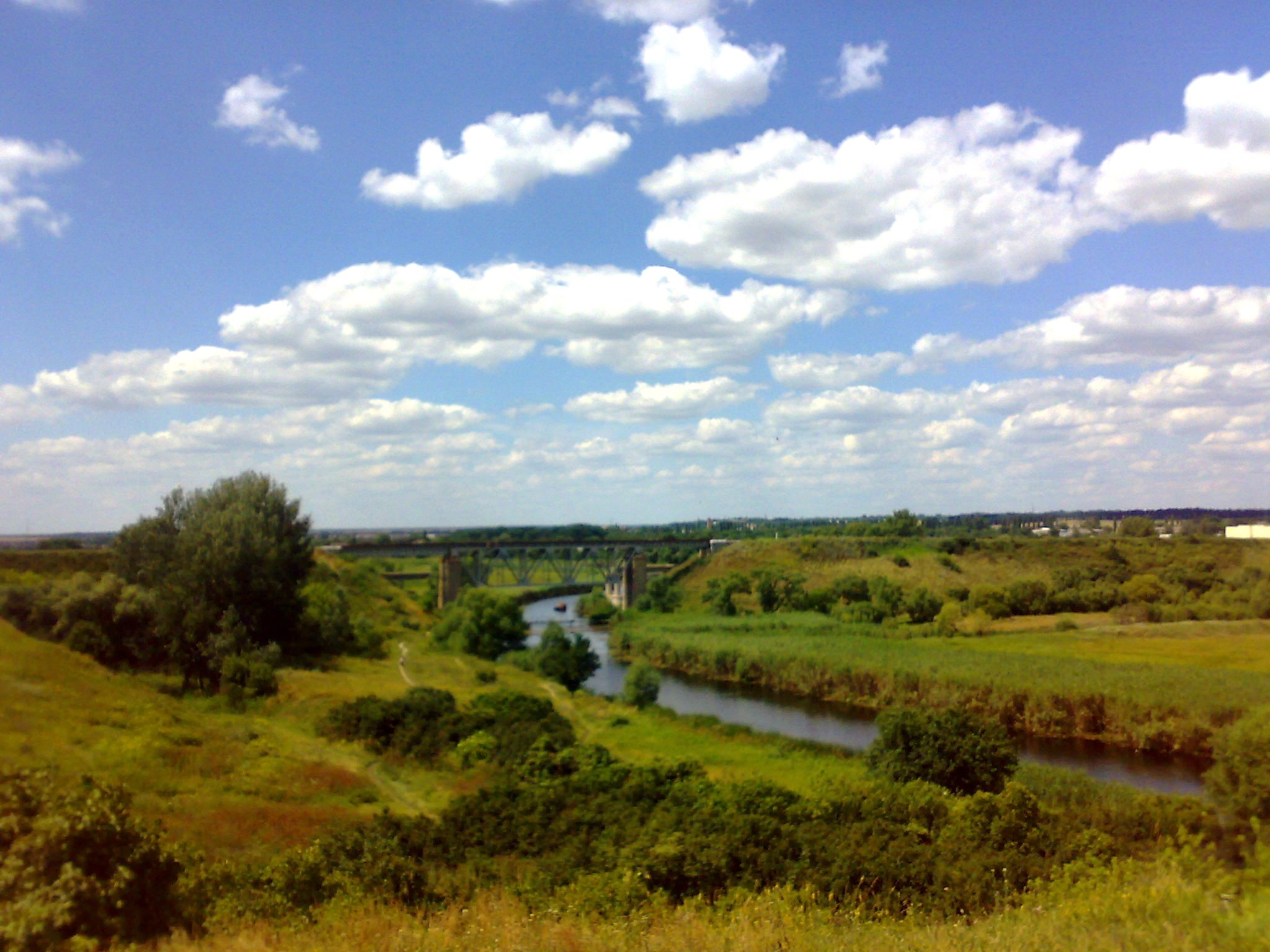
Panski Hory landscape reserve

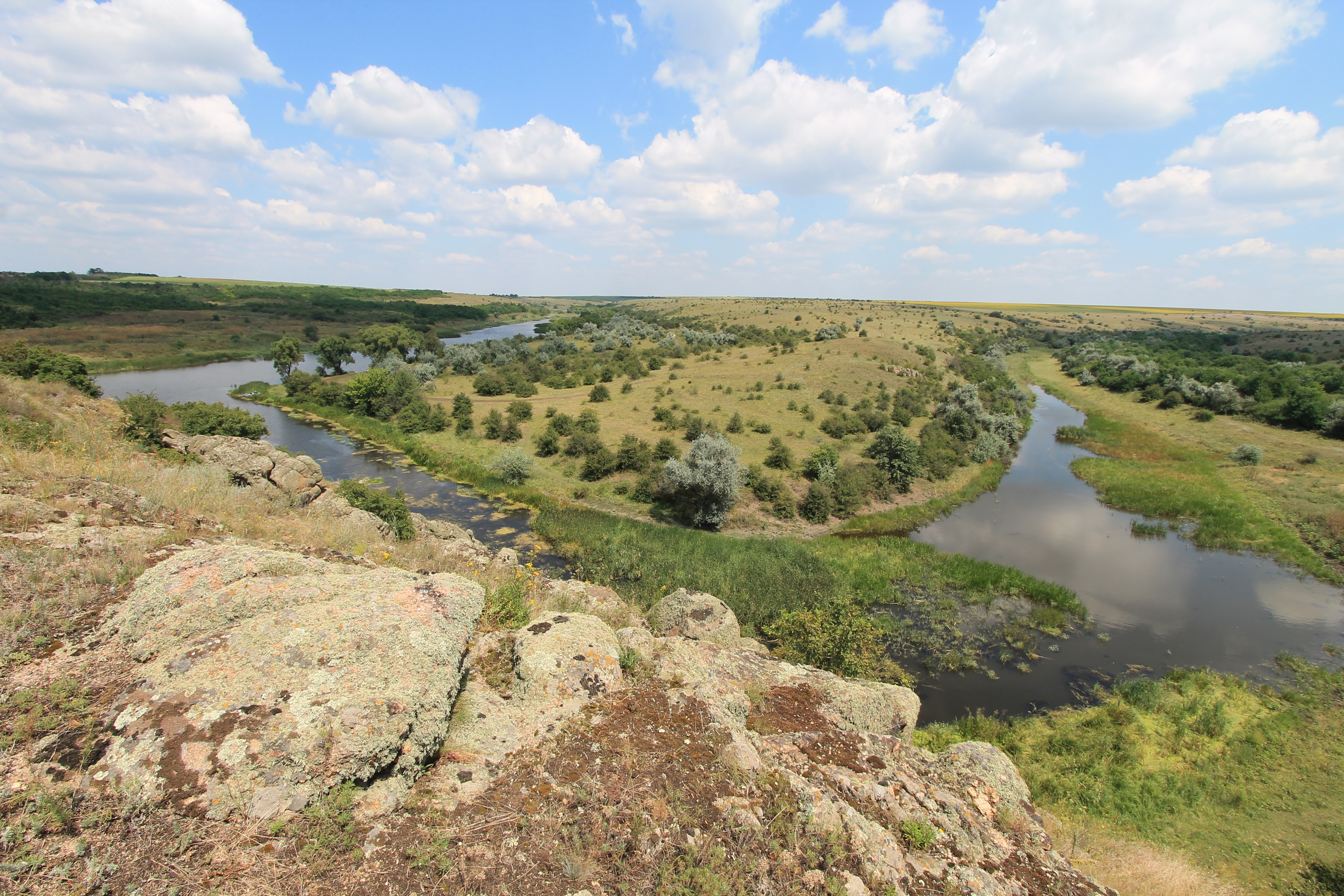
Confluence of Berezivka and Inhul rivers

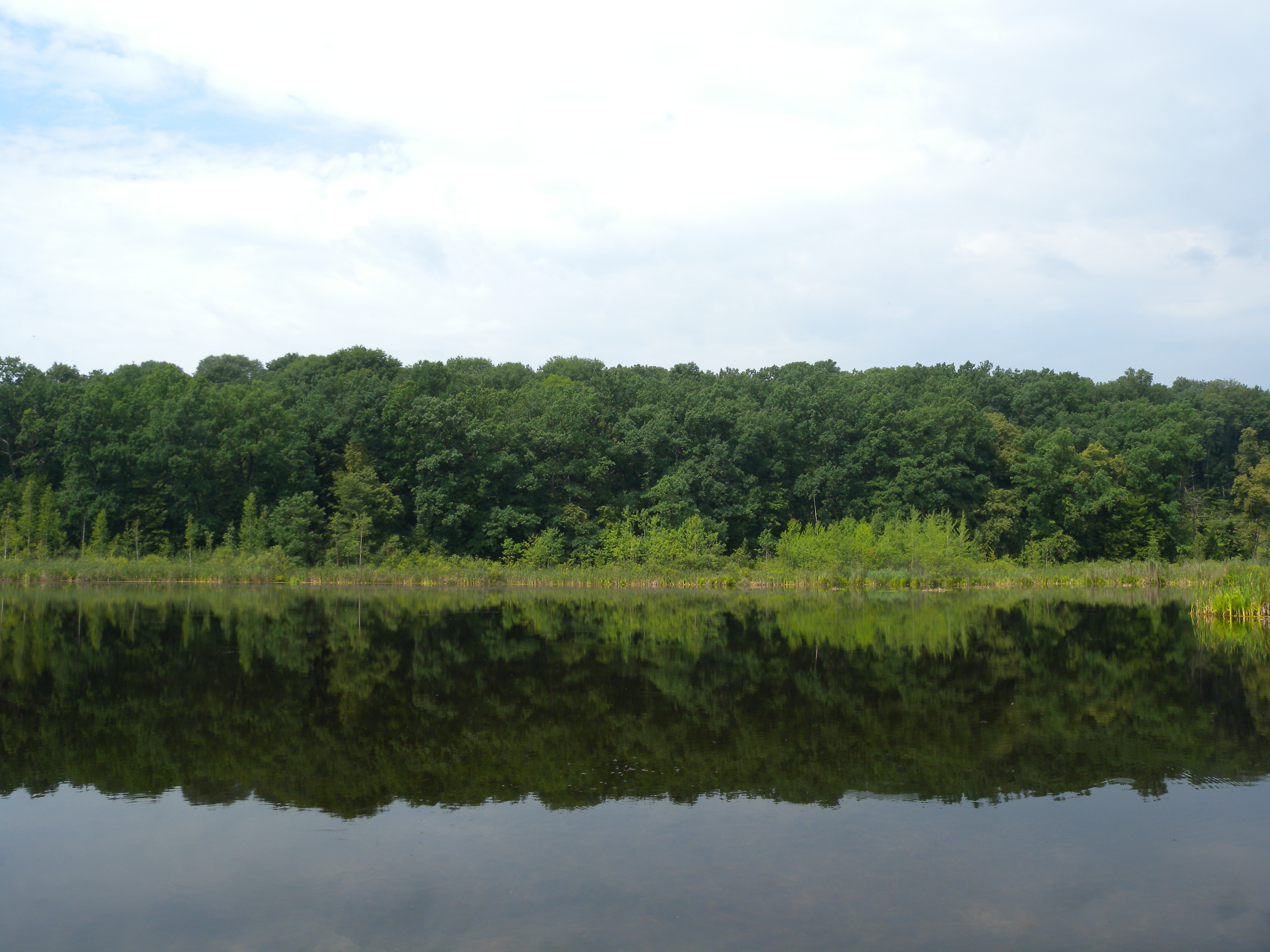
Black Forest

== See also ==
- Administrative divisions of Ukraine
