= Cardboard Maidan =

Cardboard Maidan may refer to:

- 2025 anti-corruption protests in Ukraine
- 2026 protests against the dismissal of Mykhailo Fedorov
