= Koretskyi Government =

Current government of Ukraine

- 23rd Cabinet of Ukraine

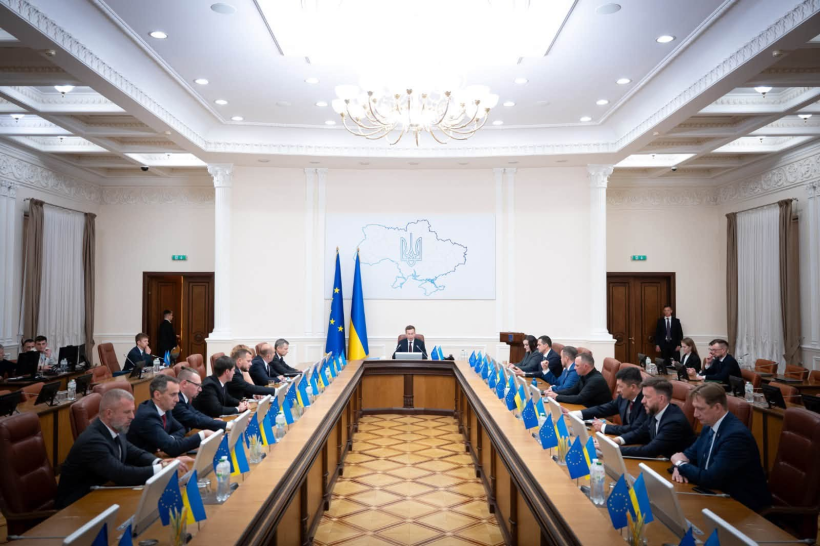
- Koretskyi Government in 2026
- Date formed: 16 July 2026

People and organisations
- President: Volodymyr Zelenskyy
- Prime Minister: Serhii Koretskyi
- First Deputy Prime Minister: Denys Shmyhal
- Deputy Prime Ministers: Vsevolod Chentsov; Tetyana Berezhna
- No. of ministers: 17
- Total no. of members: 19

History
- Predecessor: Svyrydenko Government

The Koretskyi Government (Ukrainian: Уряд Сергія Корецького, romanized: Uriad Serhiia Koretskoho) is the current government of Ukraine since 16 July 2026. It is led by Prime Minister Serhii Koretskyi and was created following the dismissal of the Svyrydenko Government.

== History ==
=== Background ===
A native of Lutsk, Serhii Koretskyi has not led any government position prior to his appointment as Prime Minister. He was a candidate for the position as the then-accomplished CEO of Naftogaz.

The choice of Koretskyi as the leading candidate for Prime Minister was connected by media, including Suspilne, to his experience in the energy sector. This, according to sources, was desired by President Volodymyr Zelenskyy to prepare the country for its 2026 winter. The attacks of Russia on Ukrainian gas stations are also a consideration.

=== Appointment of Koretskyi ===
On 16 July 2026, Koretskyi was appointed by the Verkhovna Rada as Prime Minister. His nomination, which was submitted by President Zelenskyy, was approved by 289 members of parliament.

Appointment vote Serhii Koretskyi (Independent) (Note: Nominated by the Servant of the People)
Faction		For	Against	Abstained	Did not vote	Absent
Servant of the People	228	194	0	0	6	28
European Solidarity	26	15	0	0	5	6
Batkivshchyna	24	1	0	4	3	16
Platform for Life and Peace	21	17	0	0	0	4
Holos	19	5	0	2	4	8
Dovira	19	17	0	0	0	2
For the Future	18	14	0	0	0	4
Restoration of Ukraine	17	15	0	0	0	2
Independents	20	11	1	1	3	4
Total	392	289	1	7	21	74

=== Appointment of the government ===
Package vote
Faction		For	Against	Abstained	Did not vote	Absent
Servant of the People	228	193	0	1	8	26
European Solidarity	26	0	12	8	0	6
Batkivshchyna	24	1	0	3	2	18
Platform for Life and Peace	21	16	0	0	0	5
Holos	19	2	1	5	6	5
Dovira	19	17	0	0	0	2
For the Future	18	14	0	0	0	4
Restoration of Ukraine	17	14	0	0	1	2
Independents	20	7	2	2	3	6
Total	392	264	15	19	20	74

=== Dismissal of Mykhailo Fedorov ===
The appointment of the Koretskyi Government and the following government reshuffle was followed by controversy, as President Zelenskyy dismissed Mykhailo Fedorov from the position of Minister of Defence of Ukraine. Popular among Ukrainian soldiers and the public, Fedorov was regarded as an effective government official and ranked as one of the public's most trusted figures in a June 2026 poll by the Kyiv International Institute of Sociology.

It is speculated that the dismissal was followed by tension resulting from Fedorov's staunch stances for reforms that clashed with Oleksandr Syrskyi, the Commander-in-Chief of the Armed Forces of Ukraine, across multiple issues. In a surprise move, Zelenskyy removed Fedorov from his position as part of a government reshuffle. This was followed by widespread protests across Ukraine's regions, something that is noted as unusual during the Russo-Ukrainian War.

== Composition ==
Office	Name	Took office	Left office	Party
Prime Minister	Serhii Koretskyi	16 July 2026	Incumbent	Independent
First Deputy Prime Minister; Minister of Energy	Denys Shmyhal	14 January 2026	Incumbent	Independent
Deputy Prime Minister for European and Euro-Atlantic Integration	Vsevolod Chentsov	16 July 2026	Incumbent	Independent
Deputy Prime Minister for Humanitarian Policy; Minister of Culture	Tetyana Berezhna	16 July 2026	Incumbent	Independent
Minister of Internal Affairs	Ivan Vyhivskyi	16 July 2026	Incumbent	Independent
Minister of Foreign Affairs	Andrii Sybiha	5 September 2024	Incumbent	Independent
Minister of Defense	Yevhenii Khmara (Note: Acting: 20 July – 19 August 2026)	16 July 2026	Incumbent	Independent
Minister of Youth and Sports	Matvii Bidnyi	17 July 2026	Incumbent	Independent
Minister of Health	Viktor Liashko	17 July 2026	Incumbent	Independent
Minister of Finance	Serhiy Marchenko	17 July 2026	Incumbent	Independent
Minister of Justice	Denys Maslov	16 July 2026	Incumbent	SN
Minister of Social Policy, Family, and Unity	Denys Uliutin	17 July 2026	Incumbent	Independent
Minister of Agrarian Policy and Food	Taras Vysotskyi	16 July 2026	Incumbent	Independent
Minister of Veterans' Affairs	Vitalii Kim	16 July 2026	Incumbent	Independent
Minister of Reconstruction, Infrastructure, and Transport	Mykola Kalashnyk	16 July 2026	Incumbent	Independent
Minister of Communities, Territories, and Internally Displaced Persons	Vitalii Bezghin	16 July 2026	Incumbent	SN
Minister of Digital Transformation	Oksana Ferchuk	16 July 2026	Incumbent	Independent
Minister of Education and Science	Andriy Butenko	16 July 2026	Incumbent	Independent
Minister of Economy and Environmental Protection	Oleksandr Kravchenko	16 July 2026	Incumbent	Independent
