= Protests against the dismissal of Mykhailo Fedorov =

2026 dismissal of Ukrainian defence minister

- Part of 2026 European unrest and Gen Z protests
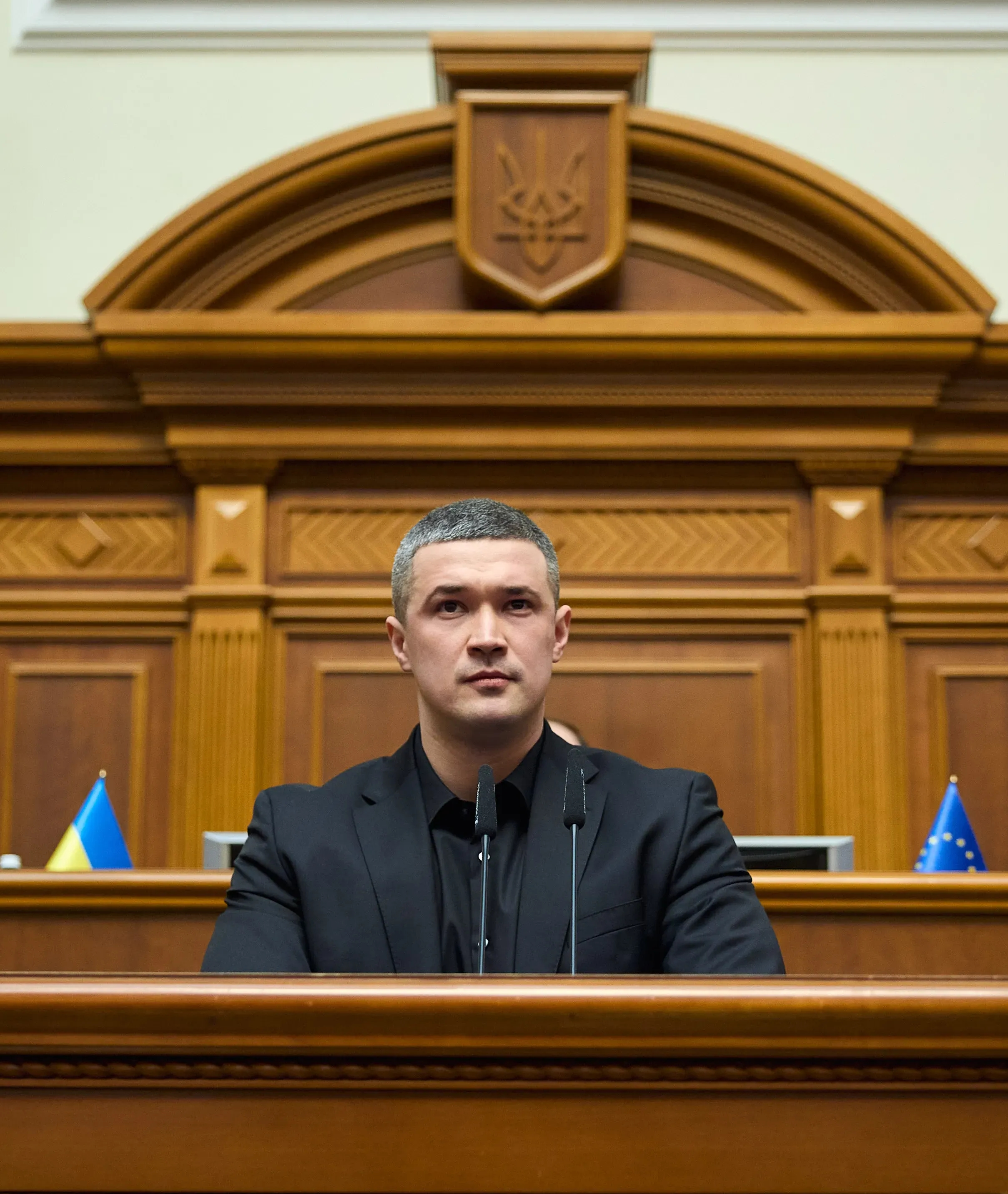
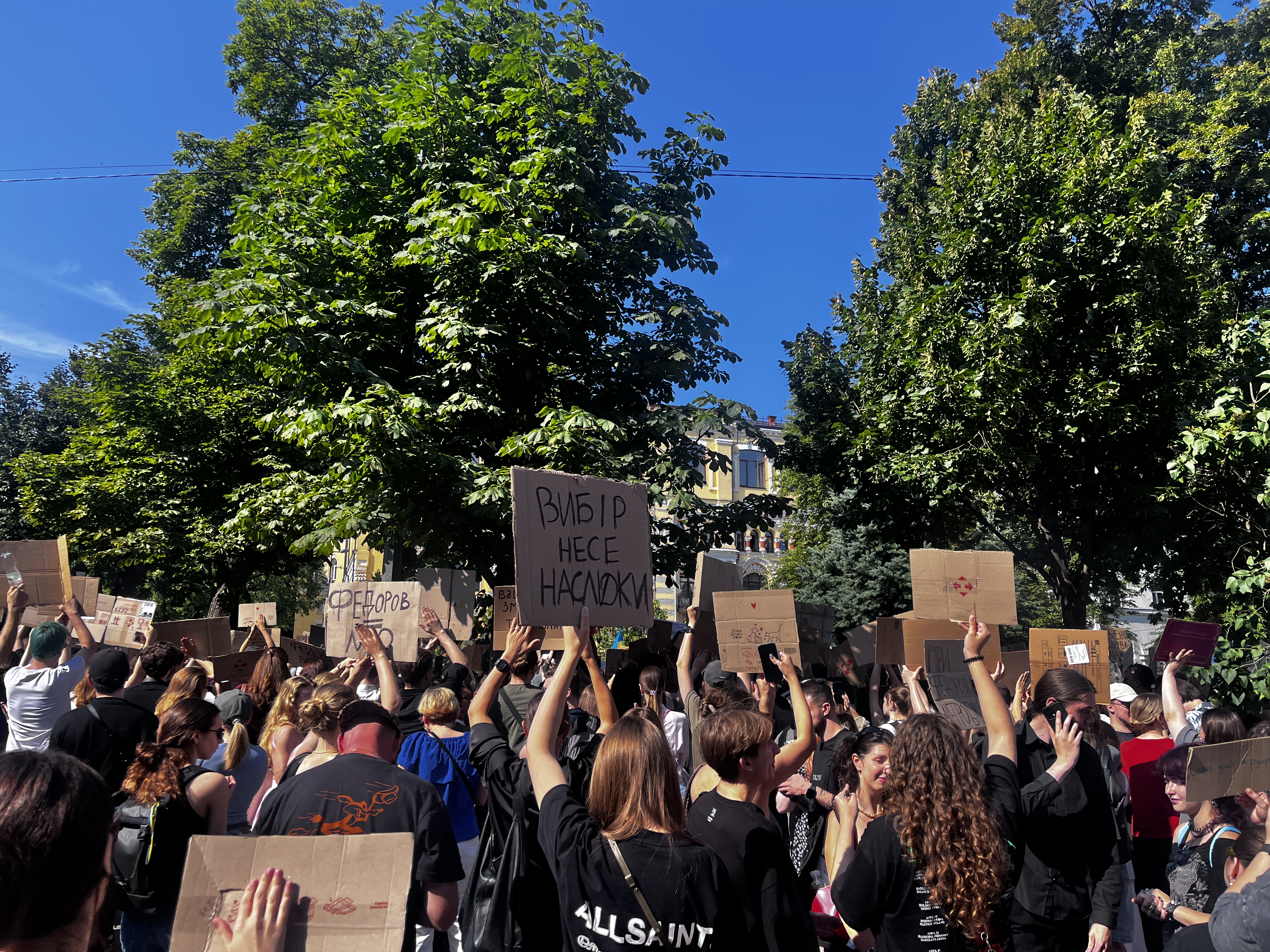
- Mykhailo Fedorov in January 2026 (left); Ukrainians with cardboard slogans protest the dismissal on Ivan Franko Square in Kyiv, July 2026 (right)
- Date: 15 July 2026 – 19 August 2026 (1 month and 4 days)
- Location: Ukraine
- Caused by: Dismissal of Fedorov as Minister of Defence, as part of cabinet reshuffle for the new Koretskyi Government; Dispute between Fedorov and Syrskyi
- Result: Spontaneous protests across Ukrainian cities in support of Fedorov; Resignation of Ukrainian officials in solidarity, including Pavlo Yelizarov, Deputy Commander of the Ukrainian Air Force; Criticism of Zelenskyy by political analysts and politicians; Dismissal of Commander-in-Chief Oleksandr Syrskyi, appointment of Mykhailo Drapatyi (21 July 2026); Fedorov not reinstated as defence minister; Yevhenii Khmara appointed in his place (19 August 2026); Fedorov called for wartime elections (18 August 2026), which was rejected; protests ended

Protests against the dismissal of Mykhailo Fedorov, (Note: Ukrainian: Протести проти відставки Михайла Федорова, romanized: Protesty proty vidstavky Mykhaila Fedorova.) sometimes called the pro-Fedorov protests, began on 15 July 2026 after Mykhailo Fedorov, the Minister of Defence of Ukraine, was dismissed from his position by Ukrainian President Volodymyr Zelenskyy, leading to widespread protests by Ukrainian citizens throughout the country. The dismissal was officially part of a wider cabinet reshuffle being conducted by Zelenskyy for the new Koretskyi Government, but as was widely reported, including by Fedorov and Zelenskyy, infighting between Fedorov and others in political and military leadership played a major role. The dismissal caused significant backlash across Ukraine, resulting in a series of protests and resignations by others in government and military in the immediate aftermath. As a result of the protests, Zelenskyy dismissed Oleksandr Syrskyi as Commander-in-Chief of the Armed Forces of Ukraine on 21 July.

Since assuming the position as Minister of Defence in January 2026, Fedorov had been popular among Ukrainian soldiers and the public for what was deemed as his effective implementation of new cyber and drone warfare policy, and other policies combatting government bureaucracy. His beliefs, however, often clashed with others in political and military leadership, including Oleksandr Syrskyi, the Commander-in-Chief of the Armed Forces of Ukraine. Their differences grew to a point where the two allegedly would only cooperate under the mediation of Zelenskyy. Reportedly pressured to end tensions, Zelenskyy unexpectedly dismissed Fedorov on 15 July, replacing him with Major-General Yevhenii Khmara as the acting minister until a replacement could be appointed.

In response to the decision, protests took place across several Ukrainian cities in support of Fedorov, including in the capital Kyiv, where over a thousand gathered near the Office of the President of Ukraine demanding Fedorov's return. These protests were sometimes called a Cardboard Maidan, a term also used for the protests to preserve the independence of anti-corruption agencies the previous year. Pavlo Yelizarov, the Deputy Commander of the Ukrainian Air Force, and other Ukrainian officials resigned from their positions the following day in solidarity. Statements in support of Fedorov were made by several politicians including Ukrainian parliament member Yaroslav Yurchyshyn, EU commissioner Andrius Kubilius, former US ambassador Michael McFaul, and other political analysts and activists. On 21 July, Zelenskyy also dismissed Syrskyi, replacing him with Joint Forces Commander Mykhailo Drapatyi; while protesters hailed this as a step forward, they kept demanding the reinstatement of Fedorov to the Ministry of Defence.

On 18 August, Zelenskyy formally nominated Yevhenii Khmara as defence minister, and the Verkhovna Rada confirmed this appointment the next day. After Khmara's nomination but before his appointment, Fedorov released a sudden video calling for wartime elections in Ukraine; elections have been suspended since the 2022 Russian invasion due to martial law. The call for new elections was rejected by a main protest organiser and many Ukrainian politicians, and the protests subsequently ended. Zelenskyy also rejected wartime elections in remarks several days later.

== Background ==
Mykhailo Fedorov had been the Minister of Defence of Ukraine since January 2026. Previously, he had worked as a social media marketer for Zelenskyy during his successful campaign in the 2019 Ukrainian presidential election, as the first Minister of Digital Transformation overseeing the launch of government web portal Diia, and as founder of the IT Army of Ukraine upon the 2022 Russian invasion of Ukraine. While Minister of Defence, Fedorov was described as a "technocrat" and "reformist", and was credited with producing considerable progress towards making Ukraine's military more efficient and modernized, especially in the fields of cyber and drone warfare. Despite falling short of his pledge to effectively combat the Ukrainian conscription crisis and reform recruitment, Fedorov was regarded as an effective government official and popular among Ukrainian soldiers and the public, with a June 2026 poll by the Kyiv International Institute of Sociology ranking Fedorov as one of the public's most trusted figures.

Fedorov's insistence on government reform has on several occasions differed from that of others in military leadership and led to tension. In particular, Fedorov clashed with Oleksandr Syrskyi, the Commander-in-Chief of the Armed Forces of Ukraine, across multiple issues—once stating that Syrskyi's policies were "splitting our country" that should otherwise be united in defeating Russia in the Russo-Ukrainian war. Fedorov later stated that he had asked Zelenskyy to replace both Syrskyi and Andrii Hnatov, the Chief of the General Staff. During a press conference with UK Prime Minister Keir Starmer, Zelenskyy commented on the situation, stating that tensions had grown to a point where Fedorov and Syrskyi only cooperated when under his mediation.

Throughout mid-July 2026, Zelenskyy began a cabinet reshuffle of several major government positions, beginning with the appointment of Serhii Koretskyi, CEO of the state oil and gas company Naftogaz, as the next Prime Minister of Ukraine after the resignation of Yulia Svyrydenko a week prior. As such, all members appointed in the reshuffle would be part of the new Koretskyi Government.

== Dismissal of Fedorov ==
I would very much like to see unity. The sides have not found it. And the problem lies not only with the sides, but with me as well. But things are as they are. And in such a situation, you have a choice: either one side or the other.

— Volodymyr Zelenskyy, in a statement to reporters in Kyiv on 16 July 2026 in response to the dismissal.

On 15 July 2026, Zelenskyy unexpectedly announced the dismissal of Fedorov, officially as part of his wider cabinet reshuffle. Major-General Yevhenii Khmara, the former head of Alpha Group of the Security Service of Ukraine, was named by Zelenskyy as the acting Minister of Defence until parliament votes on a replacement. In a post on X, Zelenskyy commented that Khmara had "unprecedented experience with technological combat operations", and supported the notion of him becoming the formal replacement, noting however that Ihor Klymenko, the outgoing Minister of Internal Affairs, was also a candidate. Zelenskyy reportedly offered Fedorov an advisory position in the Koretskyi Government, which he rejected.

During a media brief following his dismissal, Fedorov stated that Zelenskyy had felt pressured to choose between him or Syrskyi, concluding by stating "we will win with this commander-in-chief". UA.NEWS, in an analysis following the media brief, concluded by stating that Fedorov's dismissal was a political move by Zelenskyy to resolve tensions, and that because "sacrificing Syrskyi was too risky, [...] Fedorov was made the scapegoat". Fedorov followed up with a post on Facebook listing his achievements, and vowed to continue fighting against Russia.

By 16 July 2026, Parliament (the Verkhovna Rada) confirmed the formation of the Koretskyi Government and most ministers, but there was still no consensus on who to appoint as the new Ministers of Defence and Foreign Affairs (a prerogative of the Rada upon the submission of the President according to Article 114 of the Constitution of Ukraine), and the Verkhovna Rada went into recess until 18 August 2026.

== Protests ==
=== Protests in major cities of Ukraine ===
Cities in Ukraine where pro-Fedorov protests have been held

16 July Dnipro protest shouting "Restore Fedorov!", "Syrskyi out!", and "Shame!"

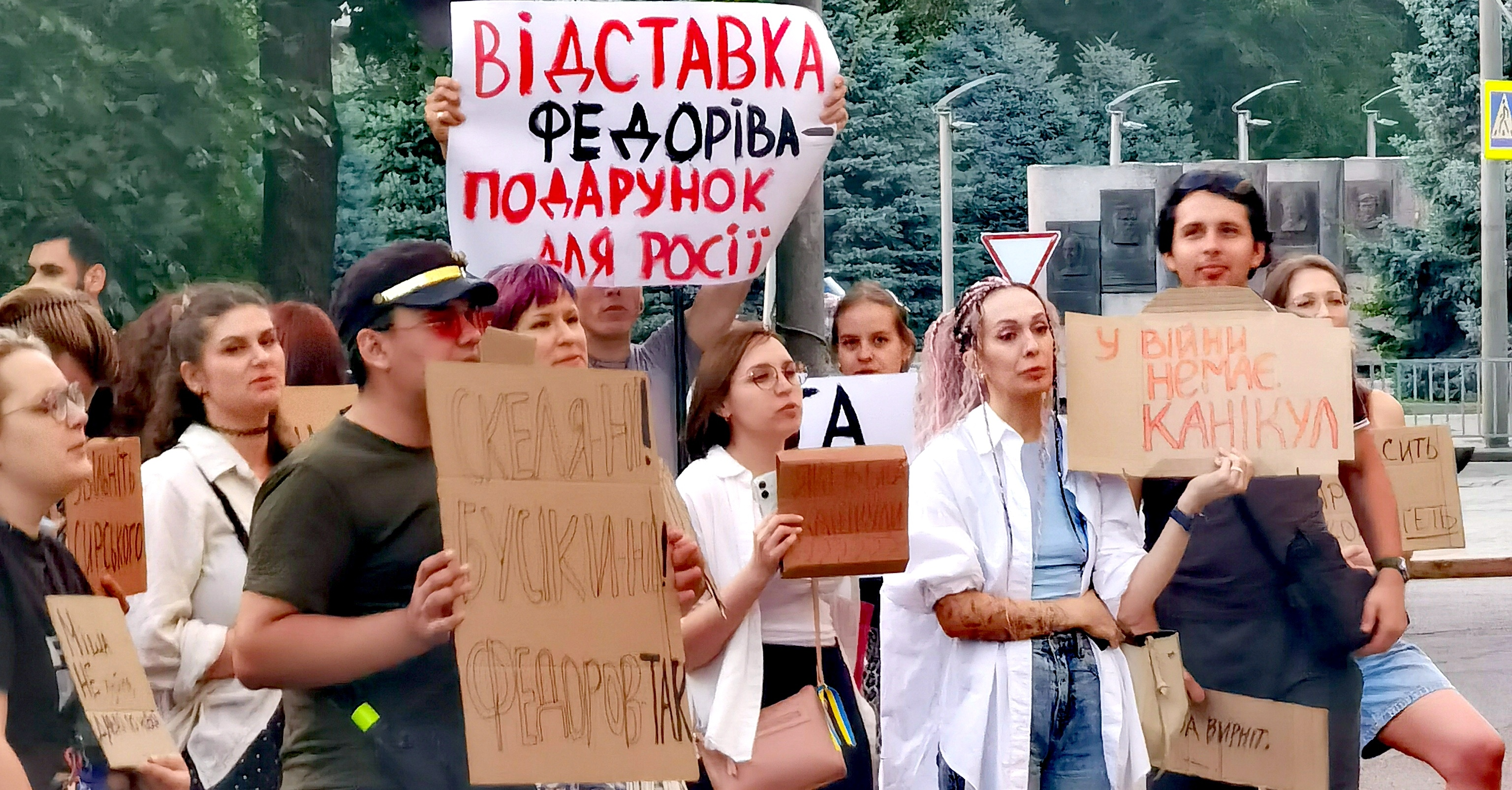
Protest in Dnipro on 16 July: "Fedorov's resignation is a gift to Russia." "In war, there are no holidays." (Note: Protesting against Parliament going in recess from 16 July to 18 August, during which it cannot appoint a new Minister of Defence or Foreign Affairs.) "Skelya: no! Busification: no! Fedorov: YES!"

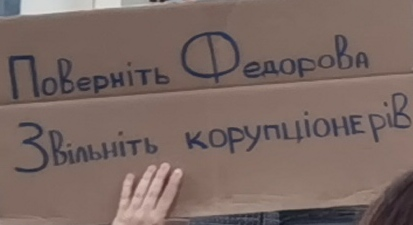
"Bring Fedorov back, sack the corrupt officials." (Dnipro, 16 July)

The decision to remove Fedorov was met with considerable backlash across Ukraine, with spontaneous protests occurring in the cities of Kyiv, Bila Tserkva, Cherkasy, Chernivtsi, Dnipro, Ivano-Frankivsk, Kharkiv, Khmelnytskyi, Kropyvnytskyi, Lutsk, Lviv, Mykolaiv, Odesa, Poltava, Rivne, Ternopil, Uzhhorod, Vinnytsia, Zaporizhzhia, and Zhytomyr on 16 July, something noted as uncommon during the Russo-Ukrainian War. In the capital Kyiv, more than a thousand protesters gathered outside near the Office of the President of Ukraine to call for the return of Fedorov: chanting "Shame!", and carrying signs with phrases including "For what?", "Hands off Fedorov", "Stop sabotaging victory!", and "The Russians are celebrating". Although the appointment of Yevhenii Khmara (widely respected in military circles) as acting Minister of Defence was regarded more positively by the protesters than Zelenskyy's initial suggestion of then Interior Minister Ihor Klymenko, many demonstrators felt Khmara was not the right person for the job, which in their view, Fedorov had been doing very well until his sudden dismissal.

Protests continued into 17 July near the Office of the President of Ukraine, demanding the removal of Syrskyi instead of Fedorov. By that second day, the focus had begun shifting from Fedorov's dismissal towards Syrskyi's leadership, with Fedorov's former adviser Serhii Sternenko criticising some of Syrskyi's past decisions in a livestream.

During the second and third day of protests (17–18 July), the slogan "Syrskyi out!" (Ukrainian: Сирський геть!, romanized: Syrskyi hetj!) was commonly expressed by demonstrators. Meanwhile, the high number of ongoing consultations President Zelenskyy had been holding with many senior military commanders from 17 July onwards were generally being assessed as him seriously considering a successor to Syrskyi. Zelenskyy also maintained contact with Fedorov, offering him various alternative positions in the government, including as deputy prime minister or as presidential adviser for military modernisation, but Fedorov repeated he would only be willing to return as Minister of Defence.

On 20 July, hundreds of demonstrators gathered in the capital city of Kyiv, as well other cities. Kyrylo Budanov, Head of the Presidential Office, positively acknowledged the concerns voiced by the protesters, saying they had been "heard", and that options about how to address the situation were actively being considered. Moreover, he complimented such peaceful protests as a sign of healthy civic engagement which would strengthen rather than divide Ukrainian society. At the end of 20 July, the protesters announced a three-day pause to grant the government time to comply to their demands, or otherwise face an even larger demonstration on 24 July. The presidential office seemed to be hoping that a dismissal of Syrskyi might be sufficient to stem the tide, although neither Fedorov nor the protesters appeared to consider that enough.

An opinion poll taken by Rating Group on 20–21 July showed a surge in trust ratings amongst Ukrainians for Fedorov from 35% to 65% in the course of one week. 72% of respondents did not support Fedorov's dismissal, 17% was indifferent, and only 5% agreed with it. Meanwhile, Syrskyi's trust ratings fell from 39% to 23% over the same period. Zelenskyy was in fourth place at 59%, while the most popular figure remained Valerii Zaluzhnyi (Commander-in-Chief, 2021–2024) at 70% trust. In the same poll, 22.3% of respondents said they would vote for Zelenskyy in the first round of a presidential election, while 14.9% would vote for Zaluzhnyi and 13.4% for Fedorov.

=== Dismissal of Syrskyi and Hnatov ===
On 20 July 2026, Syrskyi made a public apology to Fedorov in a column on Militarnyi, saying he did not know there had been conflict between them. Syrskyi wrote: "For me, it was a surprise to learn that the minister and I had a conflict. I saw our relationship as a working one, with difficult questions and different positions. That is how it should be between two institutions during a great war. If I offended someone with something: Mykhailo Albertovych [Fedorov], I'm sorry. I can be tough." Syrskyi rarely gives interviews or otherwise participates in public debate, so this statement was seen as exceptional. Around the same time, several media began asserting that Zelenskyy was considering replacing Syrskyi as well.

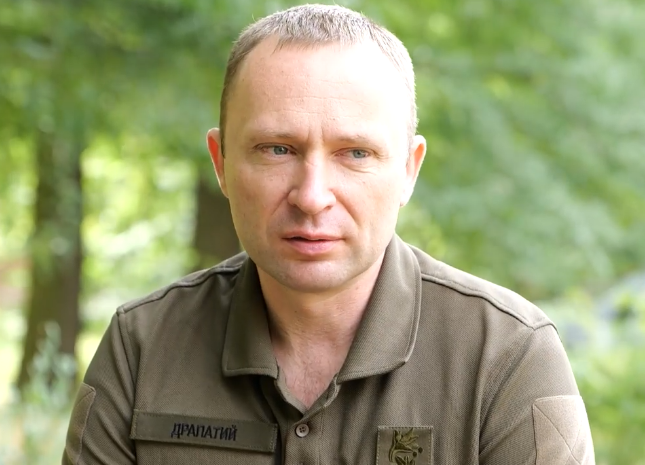
Mykhailo Drapatyi (pictured 2022) was appointed to replace Oleksandr Syrskyi.

Late on 21 July 2026, Zelenskyy announced that Syrskyi had also been dismissed from his position as Commander-in-Chief, although without stating a reason for doing so. As replacement, Joint Forces Commander Mykhailo Drapatyi was appointed the new Commander-in-Chief.

Fedorov responded positively to Drapatyi's installation, saying it brought "new air and new hope in the struggle of free people for freedom and justice. (...) This is the voice of change that could not go unheard." Despite the compromise, protests continued with the ongoing demand of reinstating Fedorov and questioning why the Svyrydenko Government initially resigned. Another large-scale rally was announced for 24 July 2026, with protest organiser and veteran Dmytro Koziatynskyi saying "We still gotta bring back Fedorov", adding that it would become an "indefinite protest" if their demand was not met. According to Rating Group's opinion poll, 55% of Ukrainians said they agreed with Syrskyi's dismissal, while 15% opposed it, and 19% was indifferent.

On 22 July, the President also dismissed Andrii Hnatov as Chief of the General Staff of Ukraine, replacing him with the Deputy Chief and former Air Assault Forces commander Ihor Skybiuk. Dismissing Hnatov and Syrskyi had been the condition Fedorov previously made for returning as Defence Minister. On 23 July, Fedorov said Zelenskyy had once again offered him various other positions, saying "I'm grateful to the president for all the options offered," but "I will not accept any position other than defense minister". Fedorov added: "No other role carries the actual authority to combat procurement corruption, complete the army's transformation, plan and execute asymmetric operations against the enemy, root out a culture of lies and unaccountability within the system. Our collective results created something unprecedented, a window of opportunity to force Russia into peace through strength. And we cannot afford to lose it." Zelenskyy confirmed these negotiations.

=== 24 July ===
External videos
- Наживо Масштабний Мітинг У Києві (Livestream: Mass Rally in Kyiv; 2 hours, 13 minutes) by Suspilne on Ivan Franko Square, Kyiv, 24 July 2026.

On 24 July, protesters took to the streets of Kyiv and other cities for the ninth consecutive day, announcing that they would not cease pressuring the presidency until Fedorov was reinstated as Minister of Defence. Starting with around 1,000 people at 21:00 and more coming in later, eventually some 2,000 to 3,000 protesters gathered at Ivan Franko Square, singing the national anthem of Ukraine, and chanting "Fedorov! Fedorov!", "Bring him back!", "There was no reason to sack him, so he must be reinstated", "With Fedorov and Drapatyi you can't defeat us!", "There's one Mykhailo, now we need another!", and addressing Zelenskyy with "You broke it, now fix it!" (or: "You messed up – fix it!"). Informal aid points were set up, offering free WIFI and free phone charging, as well as tea, water and sweets. Many demonstrators also protested the appointment of Vitalii Kim to the Ministry for Veterans Affairs (Ukraine) over Natalia Kalmykova, who was an actual veteran; slogans such as "A veteran at Veteran Affairs" («Ветерана в МінВет») and "A veteran, not Kim" («Ветерана, а не Кіма») were heard and seen frequently. Some 40 Ukrainian protesters rallied at the Embassy of Ukraine in Prague, Czech Republic in solidarity, with one protester saying: "Ukrainian society once again demonstrates that Ukraine has democracy, and the source of power is the people. We fully support the demands of the protests taking place in Kyiv and other cities of Ukraine. This is the demand to return Mykhailo Fedorov to the post of head of the Ministry of Defense and the demand that the Ministry of Veterans Affairs be headed by a representative of this very demographic group."

In Kharkiv, protesters rallied at Freedom Square, chanting slogans including: "Reforms must continue", "There's one Mykhailo, now we need another", and "We are not Russia, the people are the power". After a missile threat was issued, the protests continued underground in the Kharkiv Metro stations. In Ivano-Frankivsk, at the ninth day of continuous protests, about 100 demonstrators defied a thunderstorm to demand Fedorov back in the Defence Ministry, chanting "The government is the people!", "Serve Ukraine, not yourself!", "Bring Fedorov back!", "Drapaty and Fedorov — death to Muscovites!" In Lviv, residents chanting "The people are the power!" («Влада — це народ!») gathered on Freedom Avenue for the 10th time in Fedorov's favour, having held two rallies on 16 July, and one every day since, despite the announcement of a 3-day pause. As many protesters could only attend rallies after work, being tired and not having had dinner yet, some volunteers began handing out fresh food and drinks for free to enable their participation. One Lviv protester characterised the president's behaviour as childish: "The news of Zelensky offering Fedorov a first, third, fifth, tenth position [other than Minister of Defence] reminds me of my childhood, whenever I wanted to do anything, not just my mother's request."

=== Late July and early August ===
On 31 July, during the third week of the pro-Fedorov protests, thousands of protesters again gathered in downtown Kyiv to demand Fedorov's restoration as Minister of Defence, while smaller rallies continued every day in cities throughout the country, usually attended by hundreds of protesters in every city. In Lviv, for example, hundreds of demonstrators had been rallying every day since 15 July until 3 August and counting.

The Kyiv Independent reported that while the size of protests had declined in recent days, the protests were "renewed" on 31 July after an interview given by Fedorov to Ukrainska Pravda on 29 July. Asked by Ukrainska Pravda about the "real reason" for his dismissal, Fedorov said that he would prefer not to speculate, but said that changes he had made to procurement had upset people who began agitating against him, and that he had warned Zelenskyy in April that because his reforms had affected the interests of people and companies, there would be a disinformation campaign against him and he needed Zelenskyy's support. Trouw interviewed a protesting demobilised soldier who spoke in support of Fedorov's procurement reforms, saying his unit had often received non-functional or low-quality drones. Other protesters called out the slogan "we fight with drones, not with people", as the increased use of drones has reduced the deployment of infantry soldiers and therefore reduced deaths. Trouw linked this to the Ukrainian conscription crisis, and spoke to a protester who criticised abuses during mobilisation, which he said had increased under Syrskyi.

In the same Ukrainska Pravda interview, Fedorov explained that his conflict with former Commander-in-Chief Syrskyi had not been personal, but came about because of different visions on how the war should be conducted. Asked about criticism that he had overstepped his authority and "encroached on the responsibilities of other officials, including the commander-in-chief"—which Ukrainska Pravda said they had heard from "very senior sources"—Fedorov called that "fake news" and said he had "never interfered at the tactical level". Fedorov also denied accusations that any companies had received preferential treatment or received "disproportionately large" contracts because of his actions as defence minister. He said that if Zelenskyy changed his mind and invited him to return to his post as defence minister, he would agree "one hundred per cent".

On 31 July, the New York Times published an interview with Fedorov. Fedorov said that "lobbyists for defence contractors" had pushed for his dismissal, and said that he had used lie detector tests to find Defence Ministry officials with links to defence contractors, leading to a "shake-up that made enemies". He said that he did not see this conflict as a "political fight" and would not enter political opposition against Zelenskyy during the war, but would return to Zelenskyy's government only as minister of defence.

On 16 August, ahead of the resumption of Parliament on 18 August, once again thousands of Ukrainians rallied in Kyiv to demand the reinstatement of Fedorov as Minister of Defence, marching from under the Arch of Freedom of the Ukrainian People via Khreshchatyk to Ivan Franko Square. Co-organiser Dmytro Koziatynskyi said their goal was to "remind the president of the importance of dialogue between the authorities and society, as well as of the fact that the president himself must bear responsibility for the consequences of all questionable personnel decisions." He read out a petition that called for reforms in the defence sector, including the continuation of reforms previously launched by Fedorov. He went on to criticise the fact that the government of Ukraine had still not appointed any Ministers of Defence and Foreign Affairs (which had still only been acting since the chaotic government reshuffle in mid-July), and called out the "disgraceful decisions" to appoint Vitalii Kim to Veteran Affairs and Rustem Umerov as head of the Foreign Intelligence Service of Ukraine, despite the fact that neither of them had relevant work experience for those positions.

From 23 July to 11 August, Vox Ukraine asked 508 protesters from different parts of Ukraine an open-ended question about their reasons for protesting; respondents could name multiple goals, and the poll identified 23 categories of reasons. 43.6% of respondents said they were protesting to reinstate Fedorov as defence minister; 28% said they demanded "explanation of decisions and dialogue with the public"; 23.7% named "fighting corruption and impunity"; and 21.4% named "victory in the war and a capable, technologically advanced military".

=== Appointment of Khmara ===
On 18 August, Zelenskyy formally nominated Yevhenii Khmara for the position of Minister of Defence; Khmara had already been serving as acting minister since Fedorov's dismissal. The Verkhovna Rada confirmed his appointment the next day with 312 votes (226 were required for a majority). Protests continued on the day of the vote.

== Fedorov's speech calling for elections ==
After Zelenskyy's nomination of Khmara, but before the Rada confirmed Khmara's appointment, Fedorov released a speech on the night of 18 August calling for Ukraine to hold wartime elections. Elections have been suspended in Ukraine since the 2022 Russian invasion, as Ukrainian law does not allow elections under martial law. Fedorov asked if Russia could "effectively be given the right to decide when Ukrainians can once again elect their government", and called for a mechanism for wartime elections to be developed, saying "difficult doesn't mean impossible". He criticised the lack of a formally appointed defence minister since his dismissal, and said there was a "systemic governance crisis", criticising what he said were private interests, corruption, and appointments due to "personal loyalty".

Media described this as the "biggest" and "most direct" challenge to Zelenskyy since the full-scale invasion, and noted obstacles to elections such as the displacement of millions of people, frequent Russian bombardment, and the difficulty for soldiers to participate. Le Monde noted that no other major politician in Ukraine had called for elections since the 2022 invasion, not even major opponents of Zelenskyy such as his predecessor Petro Poroshenko, and that such pressure had usually been external.

BBC wrote that Fedorov's "call for elections angered some Ukrainian commentators", including those who had supported reinstating him as defence minister, and cited a critic of Zelenskyy who said "even the government's fiercest opponents understood" that wartime elections were not possible, as well as a source in Zelenskyy's office who said it was "highly bizarre to plan elections amidst missiles and drones" and showed a "complete lack of realism". A source in Zelenskyy's office also told LIGA.net that the presidential office did not oppose elections, but the problem was with security, asking "Let him do it amid ballistic missiles—what else is there to say?" Presidential communications adviser Dmytro Lytvyn said "Russia's daily drone and missile strikes are the exhaustive answer to this question".

The Kyiv Independent spoke to soldiers and veterans about Fedorov's call for elections, which it called "hugely controversial". An officer at the Defence Ministry said they had reacted with "shock" and "a bit of outrage" at the attempt to legitimise the "taboo" topic of wartime elections, and said "Do I want elections? Yes. The issue is long overdue, and that's true at every level. Is it possible to hold them? No, no, and absolutely not." One soldier warned that wartime elections could lead to political exploitation of the military that would be harmful to the front. A veteran and activist said that the protests had "achieved a great deal", naming the replacement of Syrskyi with Drapatyi, but said he did not support Fedorov's call for elections "at this moment"; he said the protests focused on "the fight against corruption and abuse of power", not a "political struggle or demand for elections".

In response to Fedorov's speech, protest organiser and veteran Dmytro Koziatynskyi said he viewed the idea of wartime elections "negatively" and "could not imagine" how soldiers on the frontlines could participate. Koziatynskyi expressed concern about the societal divisions campaigning might cause, said "street protests are definitely not the place for electoral discourse", and noted that the protests had been about "dialogue and reforms", not "personalities". He wished Khmara success and thanked protesters for securing Syrskyi's dismissal. Media wrote that this statement appeared to declare the end of the protests, and that Fedorov's call for elections had "backfired" as protesters did not support it. Euronews quoted negative social media responses to Fedorov's video, including protesters who said they had demonstrated for Fedorov's reinstatement but not for his "political ambitions". Reuters cited a poll by the Kyiv International Institute of Sociology during the protests, which showed that 57% of Ukrainians only wanted elections after the end of the war. (In that poll, 23% supported elections after a ceasefire with reliable security guarantees, while 15% called for elections before the end of fighting.) KIIS executive director Anton Grushetskyi said it was an "open question" why Fedorov had not understood that "even amid these protests, people didn't want to hold elections".

Politico reported that Fedorov's "unexpected" call for elections received "immediate blowback" and "retorts across the political spectrum". Olga Aivazovska, head of the election watchdog OPORA, warned about practical difficulties and the "hundreds of scenarios and actions" for Russian interference. Roman Lozynskyi, a Holos deputy, said "elections during the war are in the enemy's hands". Holos leader Kira Rudik said that "with all due respect" to Fedorov, "the constitution did not change because of his dismissal": "Elections cannot be held under martial law. It is wrong to call for tearing the country apart to serve anyone's political ambitions". Yaroslav Zheleznyak, a Holos deputy and senior member of the Verkhovna Rada's finance committee, also said "no and no" and that wartime elections were "unrealistic, at least because of the constitution." European Solidarity deputy Mykola Kniazhytskyi also criticised Fedorov's demand, citing the security and logistical difficulties of wartime elections. However, former foreign minister Dmytro Kuleba supported Fedorov's call, saying that "we don't know when it will end", "the political model that was formed in 2019" is "emotionally exhausted", and "there is a demand among people for new members of parliament".

BBC reported that the pro-Fedorov protests ended on 19 August, after Khmara was confirmed, and after Fedorov's call for an election was "widely rejected".

== Response by Zelenskyy ==
At a 23 August meeting with journalists, Zelenskyy rejected Fedorov's call for wartime elections, saying that Ukraine should do so "if we want to destroy the country". He called wartime elections "a tsunami for the state that will split Ukraine", and said his strategy was "to bring the country to the end of the war and preserve an independent and sovereign state." He said that Ukraine had already faced pressure from various sides to hold wartime elections, but no partners had offered conditions that would allow them to be held "safely, legitimately, and democratically", and said that was not possible while Russia refused a ceasefire. He said that if partners did provide such conditions, he would support elections, noting that the election would have to happen safely "without strikes and shelling", and that soldiers and overseas Ukrainians would need to be able to participate.

Zelenskyy also provided more details about the lead-up to Fedorov's dismissal. He said he had rejected Fedorov's suggested restructuring of military command under a "Ministry of War": "I called him at the beginning and said: 'The Ministry of War, where there is no commander-in-chief and the chief of the General Staff is effectively under you—forget this presentation.'" He said Fedorov had attempted to pursue similar changes anyway, and Syrskyi had "responded with his own bureaucracy", commenting that both their actions had been wrong.

Zelenskyy said Fedorov and Syrskyi stopped communicating directly and would only meet in Zelenskyy's office, and said that "there can't be a conflict at this level between leaders". He said that battlefield operations were the responsibility of the military, while logistics and support were the purview of the Defence Ministry, and "if someone steps into another's area of responsibility, that will inevitably lead to conflict. And a conflict did happen—a very serious one." He said neither the Defence Ministry nor the Commander-in-Chief of the Armed Forces of Ukraine could work without each other, and this was "simply a catastrophe in a country at war."

Zelenskyy said Fedorov had suggested dismissing both himself and Syrskyi, and Zelenskyy had decided to do this consecutively rather than simultaneously.

Zelenskyy also brought up an incident earlier in 2026, in which he said the Defence Ministry (under Fedorov) had told him Elon Musk's SpaceX had agreed that Ukraine could use Starlink for deep strikes in Russia as long as this received political approval. Therefore, Zelenskyy spoke to US president Donald Trump and told Trump that Musk had approved the use of Starlink, but Trump later said Musk had refused, and accused Zelenskyy of having "deceived him". Zelenskyy said he then went back to the Defence Ministry "and they said that maybe it was so". He said this incident was a reason for "some of the steps".

Zelenskyy also said the Defence Ministry's decision to bring spending forward had created a $27 billion budget shortfall. In a later interview with Reuters, Fedorov denied this figure and said the ministry had "devised a spending plan that relied on savings from new procurement tenders and international support."

Zelenskyy said he was thankful to both Syrskyi and Fedorov for their work. He said: "I really had and still have a very positive attitude toward Mykhailo. We have been through a lot together. But I believe that he himself goes, or is pushed, into the wrong things." He said that because of their "good and longstanding relationship", he had met Fedorov four times to offer him different positions, but Fedorov had refused; Zelenskyy commented: "well, that is his choice."

== Aftermath ==
Fedorov gave several interviews after his call for elections. On 21 August, 24 Kanal published an interview in which Fedorov said corruption was "preventing [Ukraine] from ending the war from a position of strength", and said he did not oppose any specific politician, but would decide whether to run in elections after preparations for them had been made. On 23 August, Fedorov said to BBC that Zelenskyy should be asked whether he was aware of alleged corruption in his inner circle, but said he had never known Zelenskyy to be personally corrupt throughout the time he had worked with him. A Zelenskyy spokesperson said to BBC that Fedorov had been part of every Zelenskyy government but had not made any "strong statements" at the time. Fedorov said it was his "moral right" to raise the topic of elections, and did not rule out running for president in the future. He confirmed that he would visit the US and hoped to meet Elon Musk.

On 25 August, Fedorov said to Reuters that Ukraine was at a "turning point" and still had "every chance" to win the war, but at the moment was "slowly losing". In response, the presidential office said Fedorov had been positive about the war before his dismissal, and "the only thing that had changed was his personal status". Fedorov said the Ukrainian government was "operating at 5% effectiveness" and emphasised the importance of technology such as AI-guided autonomous drones, as well as a combined strategy to use that technology. He denied Zelenskyy's statement that his Defence Ministry had created a $27 billion budget shortfall by bringing spending forward. He said Ukraine would find "innovative solutions" to obstacles preventing wartime elections, and denied that he was being "pushed by outside forces to call for elections".

On 29 August, Fedorov announced that he had accepted a position as advisor to Italian defence minister Guido Crosetto. His press service said he would remain in Kyiv and continue to focus on Ukraine.

On 30 August, Fedorov announced his trip to the US. On 1 September, he announced that he was starting a new defence technology company, in which Palantir CEO Alex Karp would be the first lead investor.

== Reactions ==
=== Domestic ===
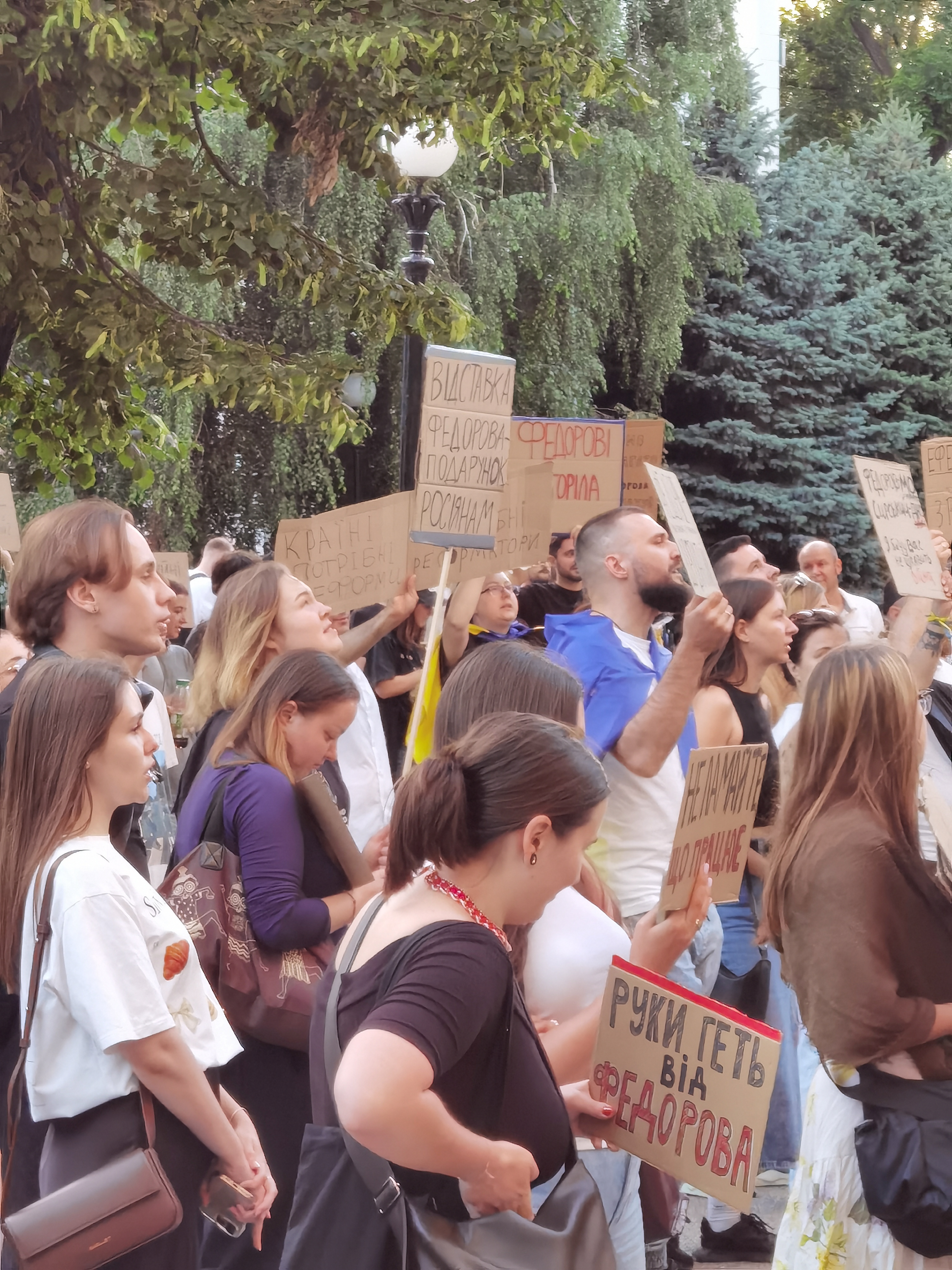
Protests in Dnipro, July 2026. Some cardboard texts read: "Hands off Fedorov." "Don't mess with what works." "Fedorov's resignation is a gift to the Russians." (Note: Росіяни Rosiyany means "inhabitants of Russia".) "The country needs reforms."

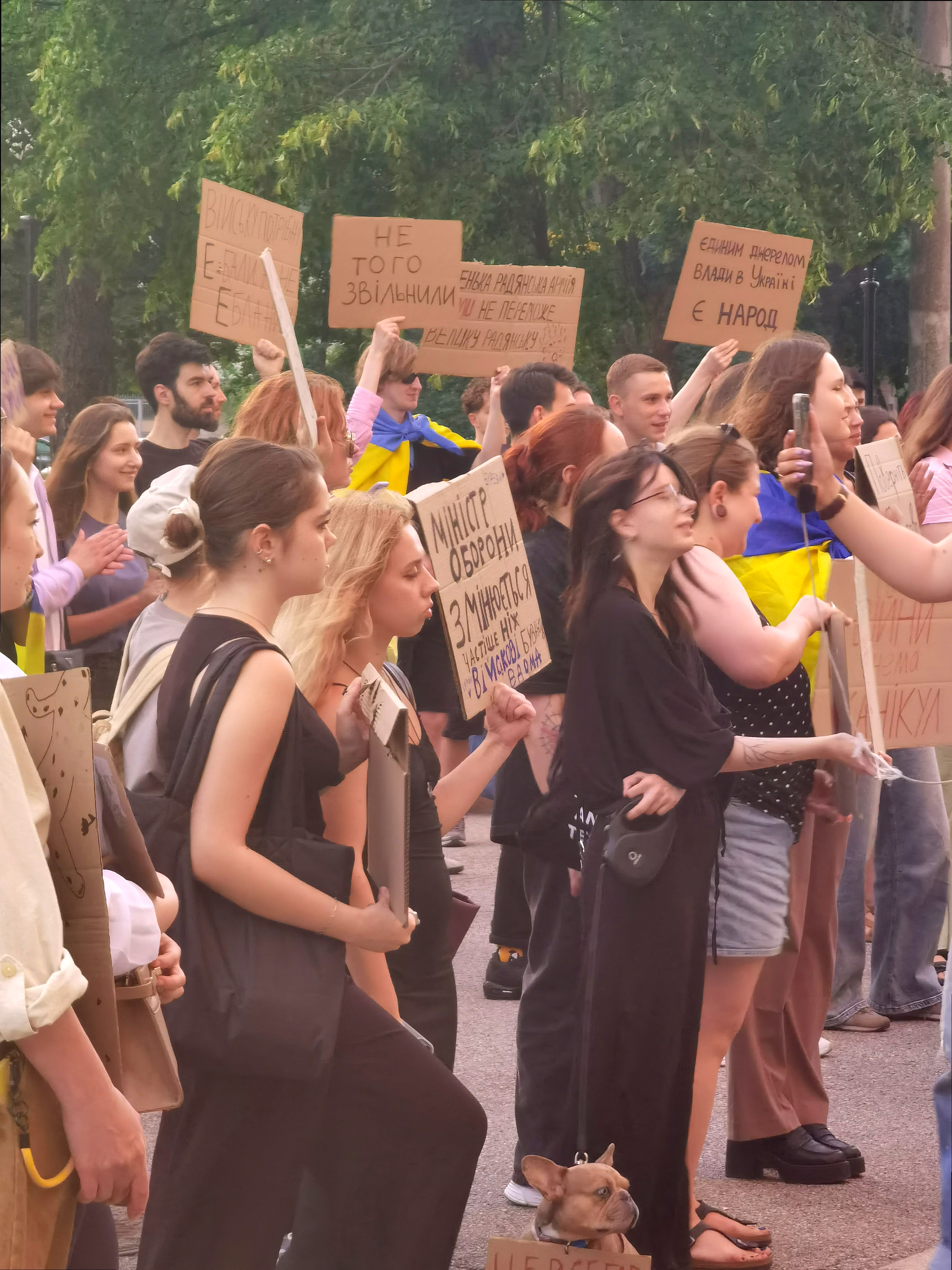
"The Defence Minister changes more often than a soldier is at home". "They sacked the wrong person." "The only source of power in Ukraine is the people." "The troops need E-points, and not E-diots." (Note: There is a word play between Є-бали ye-baly (lit. "E-points" in Ukraine's battle management system, awarded for good military performance) and Є-блани ye-blany (lit. "fuckers"; from єбланіть, yeblanitj, "to fuck"; or "idiots", but with an "E-" as in "E-mail"). Therefore, it reads something like "E-diots", which is popular slang among young Ukrainians when criticising something digital that does not work properly.)

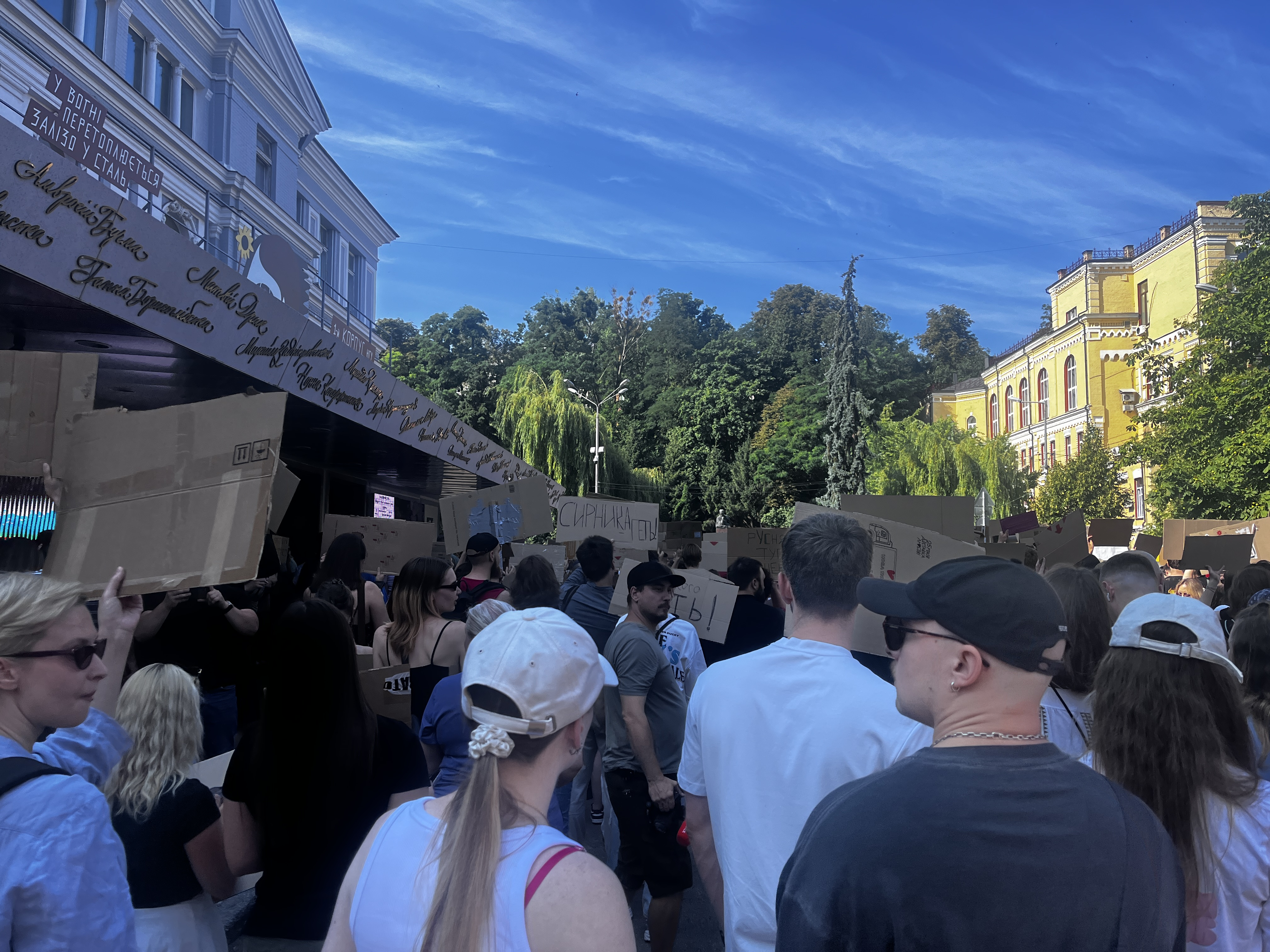
Ukrainians, with various signage, protest in favour of Fedorov, Ivan Franko Square, close to the Presidential Office Building (Kyiv), July 2026

Pavlo Yelizarov, the Deputy Commander of the Ukrainian Air Force, resigned from his position in protest of Fedorov's removal, calling the decision a "great evil for the country's defence capability". Serhii Sternenko, a Ukrainian activist and advisor to Fedorov, also stated his resignation as an advisor in the Ministry of Defence in solidarity. Sternenko further called Fedorov the "best minister of defence in our entire history", and reprimanded government bureaucracy which prevented further reform from happening. Yaroslav Yurchyshyn, a parliament member and opposition lawmaker, strongly opposed the dismissal, stating that Fedorov was only removed as he tried to combat "Syrskyi, the old army system, and everybody who is linked with corruption in the military sphere", further stating that "Zelensky chooses Klymenko because he has no ambition [...] and is not going to combat post-Soviet generals. He is 100% a person who Zelensky needs in this position". Iryna Herashchenko, a parliament member of the opposition party European Solidarity, questioned Zelenskyy's decision and called Fedorov his "only sensible appointment". Dmytro Kozatskyi, a fighter in the Azov Brigade and recipient of the Medal "For Military Service to Ukraine", posted on X it was "no longer possible to tolerate what's happening with our government", and urged Ukrainians to join in peaceful protests.

Serhii Sydorenko, a Ukrainian journalist and editor-in-chief of European Pravda, compared the dismissal to Zelenskyy's attempt to remove anti-corruption bodies last year, also resulting in a series of protests. His decision to go through with both measures, however necessary, was regarded as having "devastating consequences for trust" from the public. Volodymyr Fesenko, a Ukrainian political scientist, noted harm in replacing such a major position after only half a year and opposed the dismissal from happening. Denys Davydov, a Ukrainian citizen journalist who operates the most-subscribed YouTube channel by an individual on the Russo-Ukrainian war, called the decision the "worst thing for Ukraine" in a thirty-minute video. Several Ukrainian businessmen: including Garik Korogodsky, Kostiantyn Yefymenko, and Oleg Gorokhovskyi, also made statements online in support of Fedorov.

The Kyiv Independent, in an editorial, expressed the view that the dismissal "bears all the hallmarks of Zelenskyy's tendency to dismiss top officials and commanders who get too popular". In subsequent articles, the Kyiv Independent attributed Zelenskyy's decision to the conflict between Fedorov and Syrskyi, and said in an analysis piece that although there had been theories that Zelenskyy had felt politically threatened by Fedorov or that Fedorov had been too successful in stopping corruption, "the most popular theory proved to be correct" that Zelenskyy had acted because of Fedorov's conflict with Syrskyi.

=== International ===
Dmitry Peskov, Russian diplomat and Kremlin Press Secretary, stated the dismissal does not affect Russia unless the replacement is someone willing to "make the responsible decision [and allow] a peaceful settlement", further stating that they were monitoring the situation. Russian military bloggers responded more positively to the dismissal, noting Fedorov's effectiveness and how his removal could help Russia on the frontline. Other bloggers spread theories that the dismissal was to prevent Fedorov from becoming too powerful and usurping Zelenskyy. This notion was at least partially supported by the Qatari-based media outlet Al Jazeera and UK-based The Guardian, which both noted that the decision to dismiss Fedorov could be an attempt by Zelenskyy to remove a future political rival. According to the Kyiv Post Russian milibloggers expressed concern when Syrskyi was replaced with Drapatyi due to protests noting as a result of Drapatyi rising ranks during wartime he has a greater understanding of the modern battlefield but doubted Drapatyi would be allowed to stay in the position for long. Many Russian milibloggers believed Drapatyi would be more aggressive.

Andrius Kubilius, a Lithuanian politician and the European Commissioner for Defence and Space, stated the announcement came as a surprise to the European Union and raised concerns, as the EU just hours prior had negotiated a deal with Ukraine to increase their production of drones. Michael McFaul, the former United States ambassador to Russia, issued a statement directed towards Zelenskyy urging the return of Fedorov. Alex Karp, American billionaire and CEO of Palantir, reportedly sent Fedorov a supportive message and offered him a job, which Fedorov declined.

Unlike the 2025 anti-corruption protests in Ukraine, the 2026 pro-Fedorov protests have generally not seen widespread pressure from Ukraine's Western (European and North American) allies to reverse a controversial presidential decision. In part, this is because it is very rare in European diplomacy to demand another government to dismiss one official or appoint another. The pro-Fedorov protests demonstrated that peaceful public pressure from Ukraine's own citizens was enough to compel the President to listen to their demands, and fulfil at least some of them after several days of ongoing rallies. Reputable Western media assessed Syrskyi's successor Drapatyi (born 1982) to be an experienced and respected commander, representing a younger generation of officers, shaped by the current Russo-Ukrainian war rather old-fashioned Soviet-Muscovite military doctrine. Radio Svoboda commented: "Virtually every Western publication has mentioned an episode from the new military commander's combat record, which has made him widely known. In 2014, Drapatyi spectacularly broke through the barricades of pro-Russian militants in Mariupol," which became an Internet meme and was combined with Sabaton's 2005 song "Primo Victoria".

Protesters and analysts argued that, unlike the 2025 summer protests, these protests were not so much hostile towards Zelenskyy as they were intended to point out the president's mistakes, and urge him to correct them. Ever since the dismissal of Syrskyi and the appointment of Drapatyi, however, Zelenskyy appears to have ignored the continuing protests, implied that he had fixed what needed to be fixed, and given no indication that Fedorov might return to the Ministry of Defence.

== See also ==
- 2025 anti-corruption protests in Ukraine, which after five days of widespread protests led to the Verkhovna Rada and Zelenskyy reversing their position and restoring the independence of the anti-corruption agencies
