= Yevhenii Khmara =

Ukrainian major general and official

- Євгеній Хмара
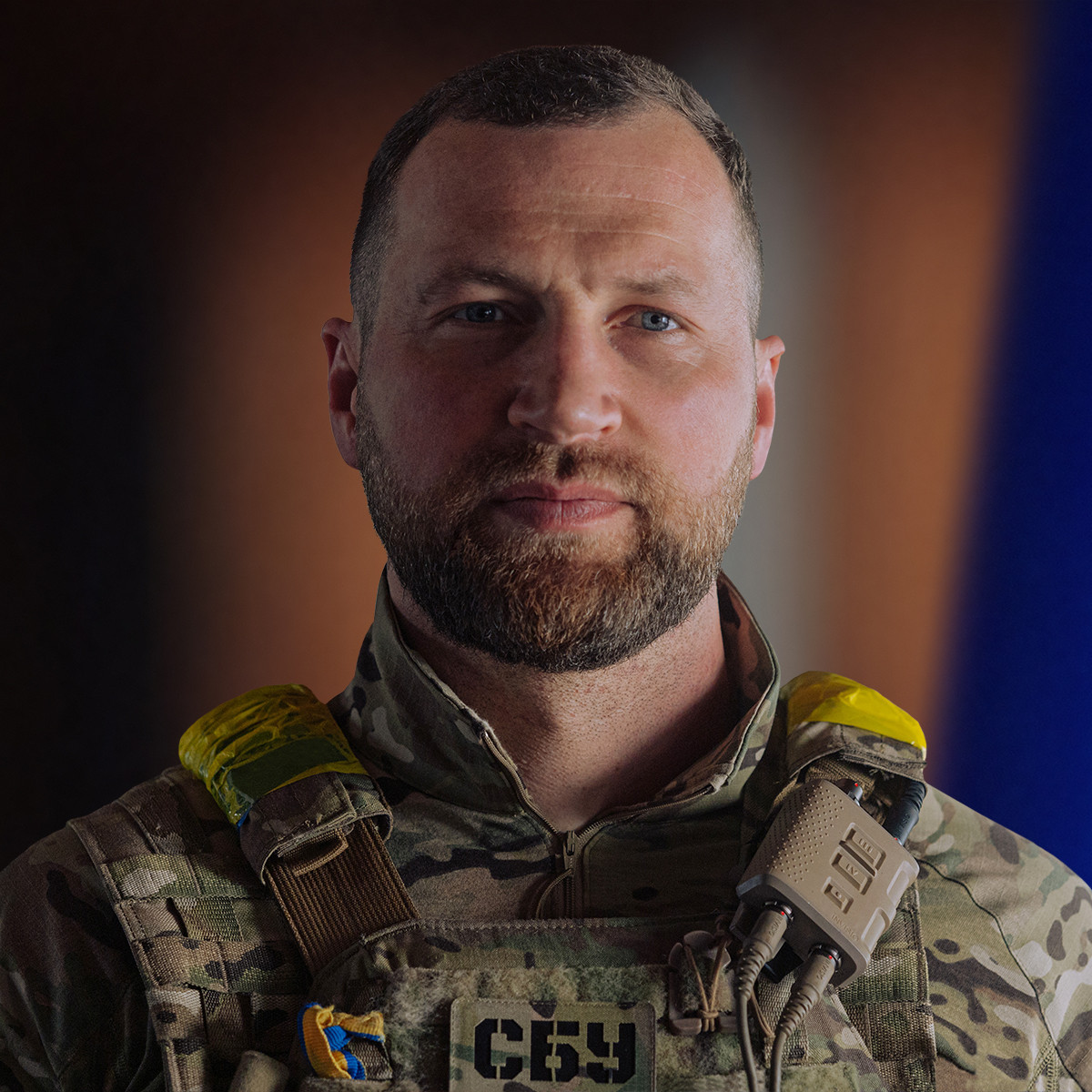
- Khmara in 2026

Minister of Defence
- Incumbent
- Assumed office 20 July 2026 (Note: Acting: 20 July – 19 August 2026)
- President: Volodymyr Zelenskyy
- Prime Minister: Serhii Koretskyi
- Preceded by: Mykhailo Fedorov

Acting Head of the Security Service of Ukraine
- In office 5 January 2026 – 16 July 2026
- President: Volodymyr Zelenskyy
- Preceded by: Vasyl Malyuk
- Succeeded by: Oleksandr Poklad

Military service
- Allegiance: Ukraine
- Branch/service: Security Service of Ukraine
- Rank: Major general
- Battles/wars: Russo-Ukrainian War

Yevhenii Leonidovych Khmara (Ukrainian: Євгеній Леонідович Хмара) is a Ukrainian major general who has been the Minister of Defence of Ukraine since 20 July 2026 (Note: The date that his appointment took effect, per the Order No. 723 of the Cabinet of Ministers of Ukraine.) in an acting capacity, and was formally appointed to the position on 19 August. He was appointed following the controversial dismissal of Mykhailo Fedorov.

== Career ==
In April 2023, Khmara was appointed by President Volodymyr Zelenskyy as head of the Security Service of Ukraine (SBU) unit responsible for special operations, counterterrorism activities, and the protection of participants in criminal proceedings and law enforcement officials.

Following legislative reforms restructuring the SBU's special operations forces, Khmara was reappointed on 25 August 2025 as head of the reorganized and renamed Center for Special Operations "A" or Alpha Group. The unit conducts counterterrorism and other special missions as part of Ukraine's national security framework.

On 5 January 2026, President Zelenskyy appointed Khmara as the acting head of the SBU, entrusting him with leadership of the agency during the ongoing Russo-Ukrainian War. He succeeded Vasyl Malyuk.

On 16 July 2026, Zelenskyy appointed Khmara as the acting Ukrainian Minister of Defence. His appointment took effect from 20 July. It was a move that came after the controversial dismissal of Mykhailo Fedorov during a government reshuffle.

On 18 August 2026, Zelenskyy formally nominated Khmara as Minister of Defence, and the Verkhovna Rada confirmed this the next day.

== Operations ==
Khmara led the counteroffensive campaign in May and June of 2022 to recapture Snake Island.

In June 2025, during his time as head of Alpha Group of SBU, the unit carried out Operation Spiderweb.

== Rank ==
On 23 June 2024, President Zelenskyy awarded Khmara the military rank of Major General. The promotion was reported by Ukrainian media as part of a broader decree conferring senior ranks within Ukraine's security and defense sector. Khmara left military service in August 2026 to comply with the law requiring the Minister of Defence to be a civilian.
