= Mykhailo Fedorov =

Ukrainian politician (born 1991)

- Михайло Федоров
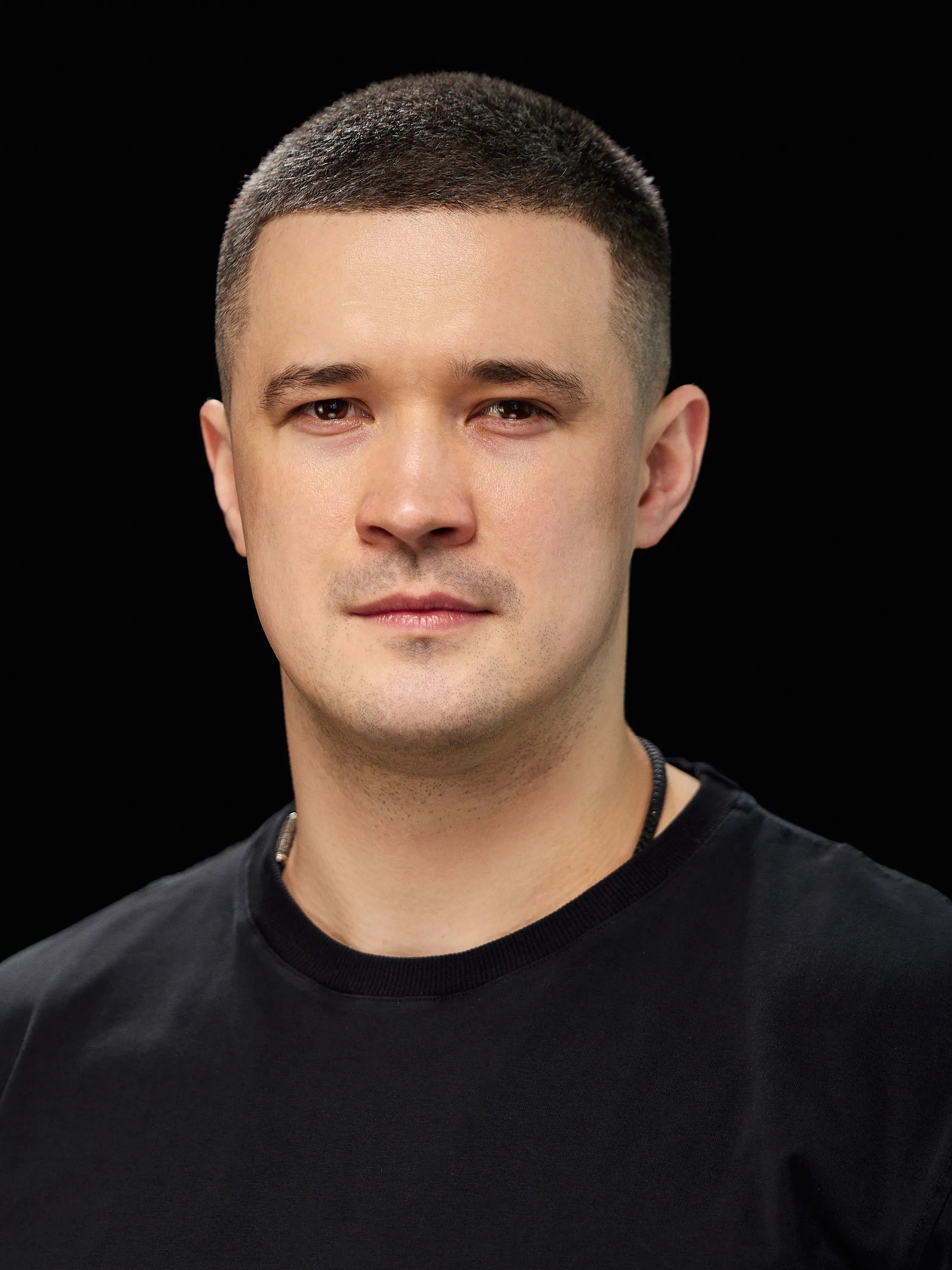
- Official portrait, 2026

Minister of Defence
- In office 14 January 2026 – 15 July 2026
- President: Volodymyr Zelenskyy
- Prime Minister: Yulia Svyrydenko
- Preceded by: Denys Shmyhal
- Succeeded by: Yevhenii Khmara

First Deputy Prime Minister of Ukraine Minister of Digital Transformation
- In office 17 July 2025 – 13 January 2026
- President: Volodymyr Zelenskyy
- Prime Minister: Yulia Svyrydenko
- Preceded by: Yulia Svyrydenko (as the First Deputy Prime Minister); Himself (as the Minister of Digital Transformation)
- Succeeded by: Denys Shmyhal (as the First Deputy Prime Minister); Oleksandr Bornyakov (as the Minister of Digital Transformation)

Deputy Prime Minister of Ukraine for Innovation, Education, Science and Technology — Minister of Digital Transformation
- In office 21 March 2023 – 17 July 2025 (Note: Acting: 16–17 July 2025)
- President: Volodymyr Zelenskyy
- Prime Minister: Denys Shmyhal
- Preceded by: Himself
- Succeeded by: Post abolished (as the Deputy Prime Minister of Ukraine for Innovation, Education, Science and Technology); Himself (as the Minister of Digital Transformation)

Deputy Prime Minister of Ukraine Minister of Digital Transformation
- In office 29 August 2019 – 20 March 2023
- President: Volodymyr Zelenskyy
- Prime Minister: Oleksiy Honcharuk; Denys Shmyhal
- Preceded by: Office established
- Succeeded by: Himself

People's Deputy of Ukraine
- In office 29 August 2019 – 29 August 2019
- Constituency: Servant of the People, No. 6

Personal details
- Born: Mykhailo Albertovych Fedorov; 21 January 1991 (age 35) Vasylivka, Ukrainian SSR, Soviet Union (now Ukraine)
- Party: Independent
- Other political affiliations: 5.10 (2014–2019)
- Education: Zaporizhzhia National University
- Occupation: Politician; businessman

Mykhailo Albertovych Fedorov (Note: Fedorov's first name is also anglicised as Michael.; Ukrainian: Михайло Альбертович Федоров, pronounced [mɪˈxɑjlo ɐlʲˈbɛrtowɪtʃ ˈfɛdorou̯]) (born 21 January 1991) is a Ukrainian politician who served as the Minister of Defence of Ukraine from January to July 2026, when he was dismissed from office by President Zelenskyy.

He served as a Deputy Prime Minister and Minister of Digital Transformation from 2019 to March 2023. On 21 March 2023 his duties and title was expanded to Deputy Prime Minister for Innovation, Education, Science and Technology – Minister for Digital Transformation. From 17 July 2025 to 13 January 2026, Fedorov had served as the First Deputy Prime Minister of Ukraine and the Minister of Digital Transformation in the government of Yulia Svyrydenko.

== Biography ==
Fedorov graduated from Zaporizhzhya National University. In 2012 during a local student festival "2012 Student Republic", he was elected a "student mayor of Zaporizhzhia" at the festival replacing Andriy Bondarenko.

Fedorov ran as a member of the 5.10 political party (led by Hennadiy Balashov) for the Verkhovna Rada (Ukraine's national parliament) in the 2014 Ukrainian parliamentary election being 166th on the party list (at its tail). The 5.10 party received only 0.42% of the vote, placing 14th among participating parties and failing to clear the 5% threshold.

Following the 2019 Ukrainian presidential election, Fedorov became an advisor to President Volodymyr Zelenskyy.

Fedorov was on a party list of the Servant of the People political party during the 2019 Ukrainian parliamentary election, without being a registered member of the party (non-partisan, according to the Central Election Commission). Fedorov was elected to the Verkhovna Rada in the election.

On 29 August 2019, Fedorov was appointed as Minister of Digital Transformation in the Honcharuk Government. He surrendered his deputy mandate upon his ministerial appointment. Fedorov's most important project as minister was set to be the so-called "state in a smartphone" project that was aiming that 100% of all government services should be available online by 2024, with 20% of services provided automatically, without the intervention of an official, and 1 online fill-in form to receive a package of services "in any life situation". On 5 November 2019 Fedorov wrote on Facebook that the "state in a smartphone" project would not be funded by the state budget in 2020 (but he hoped it would be in 2021) but that it would rely "on an effective team and international technical assistance, public-private partnerships, volunteering." The following day Prime Minister Oleksiy Honcharuk stressed that each government ministry had planned expenditures for digitization and that the Ministry of Digital Transformation did have a separate budget and that thus the state budget was sufficient to launch the "state in a smartphone" project in 2020.

In August–September 2022, Fedorov attended the Digital Transformation Strategy training course at the Yale School of Management.

Fedorov was dismissed as Minister on 20 March 2023 by parliament. The same day the Verkhovna Rada received Prime Minister Denys Shmyhal's submissions on the appointment of Fedorov as the Deputy Prime Minister for Innovation, Development of Education, Science and Technology and (a return as) Minister of Digital Transformation. On 21 March 2023 he was appointed to these posts.

=== Minister of Defence of Ukraine ===
On 2 January 2026, Ukrainian President Zelenskyy offered Fedorov the position of Minister of Defense. On 14 January, Fedorov was appointed as Minister of Defence of Ukraine by the Verkhovna Rada. He made an announcement the same day that the pressures on the Ukrainian defence forces included two million Ukrainians evading mobilisation and 200,000 serving soldiers having gone AWOL. He is the fourth minister to hold this position since the Russian invasion.

He ordered defence ministry and army audits that The Economist reported discovered overspending of ₴300 billion ($6.6 billion). He started an open-tender competitive procurement system, which he stated cut the cost of artillery shells by about 16%. Agreement of a soldiers' reform package was delayed until June 2026, which almost trebled the pay of frontline infantry, introduced fixed term contracts of between 6 and 24 months, and planned to soon start limited demobilisation for the longest-serving soldiers. However some army generals were sceptical of his changes.

Seven months after his appointment as the Ukraine's Defence Minister, Fedorov was dismissed following the resignation of the Prime Minister and several other ministers as part of President Zelenskyy's governmental reshuffle.

==== Air Land Economy ====
During his time in office, Fedorov was responsible to develop and present a defence strategy called AIR LAND ECONOMY, which focused on three pillars: protecting the sky, deterring the enemy on the ground, and exhausting the Russian economy.

In the area of air defence, several initiatives were implemented by June 2026. The strategic goal was set to achieve a 95% interception rate of aerial targets. A deputy commander of the Air Forces, (Pavlo Yelizarov), was appointed to oversee the development of "small" air defense systems, which include mobile fire groups, anti-aircraft artillery, and interceptor drones. Under an experimental "private" air defence project for enterprises, 30 organisations of various ownership types from Kharkiv, Odesa, Kyiv, Zaporizhzhia, Poltava, Zakarpattia, and other regions joined the network; these groups successfully downed a jet-powered Shahed drone traveling at speeds over 400 km/h. Following a directive from President Zelenskyy, testing began on low-cost interceptor missiles designed to shoot down Shahed drones, aiming to scale up production ahead of the autumn-winter period. Between February and April 2026, the construction rate of anti-drone net protection along highways doubled to 8.5 km per day, ultimately securing over 1,170 km of logistic routes. Additionally, a member of the Brave1 defense-tech cluster developed the first Ukrainian guided aerial bomb (KAB), which completed testing and was cleared for combat deployment.

The second pillar of the AIR LAND ECONOMY strategy focuses on strengthening the frontline, aiming to inflict at least 200 casualties on the adversary for every square kilometre of territorial advancement. According to verified data from the "yeBaly" tracking system, Russian military personnel killed or severely wounded numbered 34,544 in December 2025, 35,351 in March 2026, and 35,203 in April 2026. A key factor in the increasing adversary losses was the deactivation of Starlink for Russian users in February 2026, responding to the enemy's exploitation of the technology to coordinate drone attacks against civilians; in cooperation with SpaceX, a terminal verification mechanism via a whitelist system was introduced.

Within this ground domain, a series of digital and organisational reforms were implemented. The "Mission Control" module was launched within the DELTA system to enable real-time management of drone operations, including asset tracking, coordination with EW and air defense units, and efficiency analytics. The Ministry of Defence, together with the General Staff, launched the "Logistics Lockdown" initiative to systematically dismantle Russian supply capabilities within an operational depth of up to 150 km, allocating ₴5 billion for the initial stage to procure middle-strike capabilities. Through the DOT-Chain Defence digital marketplace, the military received 485,000 UAVs and other hardware valued at ₴31.4B in 2026. More than 2,000 specialist positions were opened to build an IT vertical within the Armed Forces of Ukraine. The "A1" Defence AI Centre was established with support from the UK government to train artificial intelligence models on real combat data. Paper-based duplicate reporting was abolished in military units using digital accounting software, the drone distribution workflow was fully digitised—reducing delivery times from warehouses to frontline units two- to three-fold down to roughly one day, and purchasing procedures for explosives were streamlined for ammunition manufacturers. Serhii Sternenko was appointed advisor to the minister on the tactical application of UAVs. Under the ministry's oversight, the Defence Procurement Agency contracted for a record-breaking number of multicopters in January and February.

Exerting economic pressure on Russia constitutes the third pillar of the AIR LAND ECONOMY strategy. In March 2026, Ukraine launched successful long-range strikes against key Russian export oil terminals in Primorsk, Ust-Luga, and Novorossiysk, disrupting maritime logistics, decelerating export volumes, and elevating Russia's financial costs of waging war.

In February 2026, during a meeting of the Ukraine Defence Contact Group (Ramstein format), international partners confirmed a US$38B assistance budget for Ukraine for 2026, with the core drone, air defence, and Patriot missile coalition comprising the United Kingdom, Germany, Norway, the Netherlands, Belgium, and Sweden. Following the April 2026 UDCG meeting, US$4B was allocated toward strengthening air defence alongside over US$1.5B for UAVs, while the UK announced its largest-ever drone delivery package to Ukraine. In May 2026, Norway funnelled over US$302M into the PURL fund mechanism, including funding for Patriot missiles, while Canada injected US$200M into the same procurement channel. Fedorov systematically coordinated diplomatic cooperation with foreign governments, defense ministries, and global tech corporations to drive foreign direct investment into Ukraine's defense industry. Additionally, under the UNITE program in 2026, the first "Brave NATO" tech competition was introduced, establishing a collaborative framework for companies from Ukraine and NATO countries to co-develop defense products for the Ukrainian battlefield, with a primary focus on countering UAVs.

During an official visit to Germany in April, Fedorov signed three defense agreements totaling approximately €4B, focused on bolstering air defence, developing deep-strike weapon capabilities, and manufacturing drones. Germany agreed to finance a contract for several hundred Patriot missiles, deliver 36 IRIS-T launchers, invest €300M into long-range capabilities, and engage in the joint production of 5,000 AI-assisted mid-strike drones.

==== Dismissal ====
On 15 July 2026, Ukrainian President Volodymyr Zelenskyy dismissed Fedorov from his position as Defence Minister after serving six months in office. The dismissal came the day after Ukraine’s parliament accepted the resignation of prime minister Yulia Svyrydenko and prompted public protests in Kyiv and other Ukrainian cities, with demonstrators calling for Fedorov’s reinstatement. Media reports linked Fedorov's removal to his conflict with the commander-in-chief of the Armed Forces of Ukraine Oleksandr Syrskyi.

On 28 August 2026, Fedorov agreed to become an advisor to Italian Defence Minister Guido Crosetto. His press service said he would stay in Kyiv and continue to focus on his work in Ukraine.

=== Defence Forces transformation ===
In June 2026, the Ministry of Defence initiated the first phase of a comprehensive transformation of the Ukrainian military. Its central objectives included restoring public trust in state defence structures, preserving valuable human resources along the line of contact, ensuring institutional fairness, and increasing motivation for voluntary service in the Armed Forces. As part of these structural reforms, the military transitioned to a new contract-based system with clearly defined service periods. The ministry also introduced high levels of financial remuneration for frontline infantry, averaging around ₴300,000 (over US$7,000) per month, while raising the baseline monthly pay for rear-echelon military personnel to 30,000 UAH. Furthermore, pay rates were doubled for combat unit commanders, their deputies, and chiefs of staff. To address personnel retention and welfare, the ministry implemented a structured system of service deferments and phased discharges for veterans who had been serving continuously since 2014 and 2022. Bureaucratic friction was reduced through the launch of an automated transfer system between military units that bypassed redundant approvals, alongside a fast-track reinstatement mechanism allowing service members who went AWOL (SZCh) to return directly to operational combat units. Operationally, the Mission Control system was utilised to manage and coordinate tactics along the first line of defence, and the military recruitment market was opened to foreign nationals to reinforce combat elements and safeguard Ukrainian personnel.

In an interview on 17 June 2026, Fedorov noted that, following an analysis of the situation within the department, certain individuals had "come to light" who were "on the radar" of the law enforcement agencies and he says at that point it was decided to put them through a polygraph test. Fedorov said, "Those who refused were sacked immediately. Those who agreed but performed poorly were sacked. Those who performed adequately were allowed to keep their jobs."

=== Other projects ===
On 19 May 2026, the State Operator for Non-Lethal Acquisition (DOT) initiated an open procurement procedure for 5,000 pickup trucks via the Prozorro platform, allowing military units to select equipment categories directly from a catalogue with automated supplier assignment; deliveries are slated to conclude by December 2026. On 25 May 2026, DOT completed its largest contract for long-range 155mm artillery ammunition across six manufacturers, securing a 16% cost savings due to competitive bidding and allowing for the ordering of tens of thousands of additional shells. On 10 April 2026, the Cabinet of Ministers adopted Resolution No. 489, establishing an experimental fast-track framework for innovative defence procurement, which took effect on 14 April 2026, with a planned two-year duration. On 20–21 April 2026, the Ministry of Defence began rolling out a universal ground control station designed for fibre-optic drones, formalising standardised technical parameters and supplying prototypes to frontline units for operational testing.

== Services and projects ==
During his tenure, Fedorov was responsible for the following services and projects:

- Diia – Ukrainian government online portal and application for public services. More than 70 public services are available on the portal, with 14 digital documents and 21 services through the mobile app. As of October 2025, 23 million Ukrainians use Diia.
  - Diia.Business – a platform that provides support services for businesses, including free consultations.
  - Diia.Centers – a network of administrative service centers providing public services.
  - Diia.City – a legal framework for IT companies. As of April 2026, Diia.City included more than 4,100 technology companies and over 153,000 IT professionals.
  - Diia.Digital Education – a platform providing educational resources to improve digital literacy. As of December 2025, it had more than 2.7 million users and offered over 600 educational products.
- e-Residency – a status for foreigners that allows them to register and operate a business remotely in Ukraine without a physical presence in the country.
- COVID certificates – Digital certificates recognized by the EU.
- eMalyatko – a service that allows parents of newborns to apply for multiple government services through a single application. As of December 2024, more than 600,000 parents have used the service.
- eAid – a state support program that allows Ukrainians to apply via Diia for financial assistance.
- Internet-Subvention – a project that provided Internet connectivity to 1M Ukrainians and 7,000 social facilities in 3,000 villages.
- A laptop for every teacher – an initiative of the Ministry of Digital Transformation and the Ministry of Education and Science of Ukraine. As of September 2022, more than 61,000 Ukrainian teachers had received laptops.

== Activities during full-scale invasion ==
Since Russia's full-scale invasion, Fedorov was also responsible for the following projects:

- Expanded eAid service — Ukrainians in the areas where active hostilities were taking place were able to receive ₴6,500 of support from the state. The amount of ₴30.9B was issued to 5 million Ukrainians.
- United24 – a fundraising platform for donations from all over the world to support Ukraine. Thanks to these funds, military and humanitarian needs of the state are fulfilling. All funds are distributed in three areas: defence and demining; humanitarian and medical aid; and rebuild Ukraine. For example, due to the donation raised it became possible to purchase a helicopter for evacuation of the seriously injured; 44K helmets; 48K units of body armour; 7 special vehicles for the military; 35 portable ALV apparatuses for medics working in the frontline. And this is just the beginning.
- The Army of Drones is a comprehensive program developed by the Ministry of Defence jointly with the General Staff. The project procures drones for the Armes Forces of Ukraine, repairs drones and provides systematic training for drone operators. As of now, team has signed contracts to purchase UAVs for over ₴1.1B. People also donate their own drones for the needs of the AFU.
- PayPal started its operation in Ukraine. In February 2022, Fedorov appealed to PayPal CEO Dan Schulman to leave the Russian market. The company has now left the Russian market. The total amount of money that has been transferred and received through PayPal by Ukrainians is over US$200M.

=== Collaboration with Elon Musk ===
Two days after Russia invaded, Fedorov used Twitter to ask Elon Musk to provide Ukraine with Starlink stations. Two days later, Musk responded that Starlink had been activated in Ukraine. As of 2023, there were over 18K Starlinks operating in Ukraine, providing critical infrastructure for government agencies, etc with a stable Internet connection. The SpaceX team has also updated the software to reduce power consumption so that Starlink can be powered from a car cigarette lighter. Given the number of terminals and their demand, SpaceX decided to open a representative office in Ukraine. On 9 June, Starlink Ukraine received official registration as on operator.

In 2022, Musk sent Tesla Powerwalls to facilities in Borodianka and Irpin, reported by Fedorov. The systems provide backup power during power disconnections.

=== Collaboration with Palantir ===
In September 2026, Fedorov announced that Palantir CEO Alex Karp would be the first major investor in a new defence company that he was founding. In a joint video recorded with Fedorov, Karp described their working relationship as having lasted "half a decade", and that he was "inspired" by Fedorov. In an interview in October 2026 with The Washington Post, Fedorov said that one of his main plans for the investment was to create an "army of robots" to act as reinforcements for the Ukrainian military. Another part of the company will develop interceptors for Russian missiles.

In the same interview, Fedorov compared the development of autonomous weapons systems to nuclear weapons, proposing that collaboration with Western companies could be a "new Manhattan Project" for Ukraine.

=== Cyberwar ===
According to Fedorov, the term "cyberwar" will soon become official in the world. Since the full scale invasion, Ukraine has involved in a series of operation targeting cyber warfare and misinformation campaigns.

- Digital Blockade of the Russian Federation. Since the beginning of the full-scale invasion, the Ministry of Digital Transformation has reached out to tech companies to stop their operations in Russia. In total, over 600 companies were approached, about 150 responded to the request, and 78 left the Russian market completely.
- eVorog – a chatbot where Ukrainians can report on the movement of Russian armed forces, their war crimes and collaborators. Also Ukrainians can report information about explosive and suspicious objects, and mines in particular. Currently, more than 350,000 people have already used the chatbot.
- Artificial Intelligence Photo Identification - The Ministry of Digital Transformation was able to identify incidents of looting committed by Russian soldiers with the help of AI. The algorithms also identified more than 300 photos of dead Russian soldiers.

== Awards ==
- Order of Merit of the III degree for outstanding achievements in economic, scientific, social and cultural, military, state, public and other spheres of public activities for the benefit of Ukraine.
- Fedorov entered the Politico Tech 28 rating of European digital leaders and took first place in the Rulebreakers category.
- Mykhailo Fedorov and Ukraine were noted at the CYBERSEC European Cybersecurity Forum. They received two awards: for heroic resistance to Russian aggression and for defence of the digital boundaries of the democratic world.

== Personal life ==
Fedorov is married to Anastasia Volodymyrivna Fedorova (née Karpenko). His wife also studied at Zaporizhzhia National University, but in a different department. They have one child.

== See also ==
- Honcharuk Government
- List of members of the parliament of Ukraine, 2019–24
