= Svyrydenko Government =

Former government of Ukraine from 2025 to 2026

- 22nd Cabinet of Ukraine

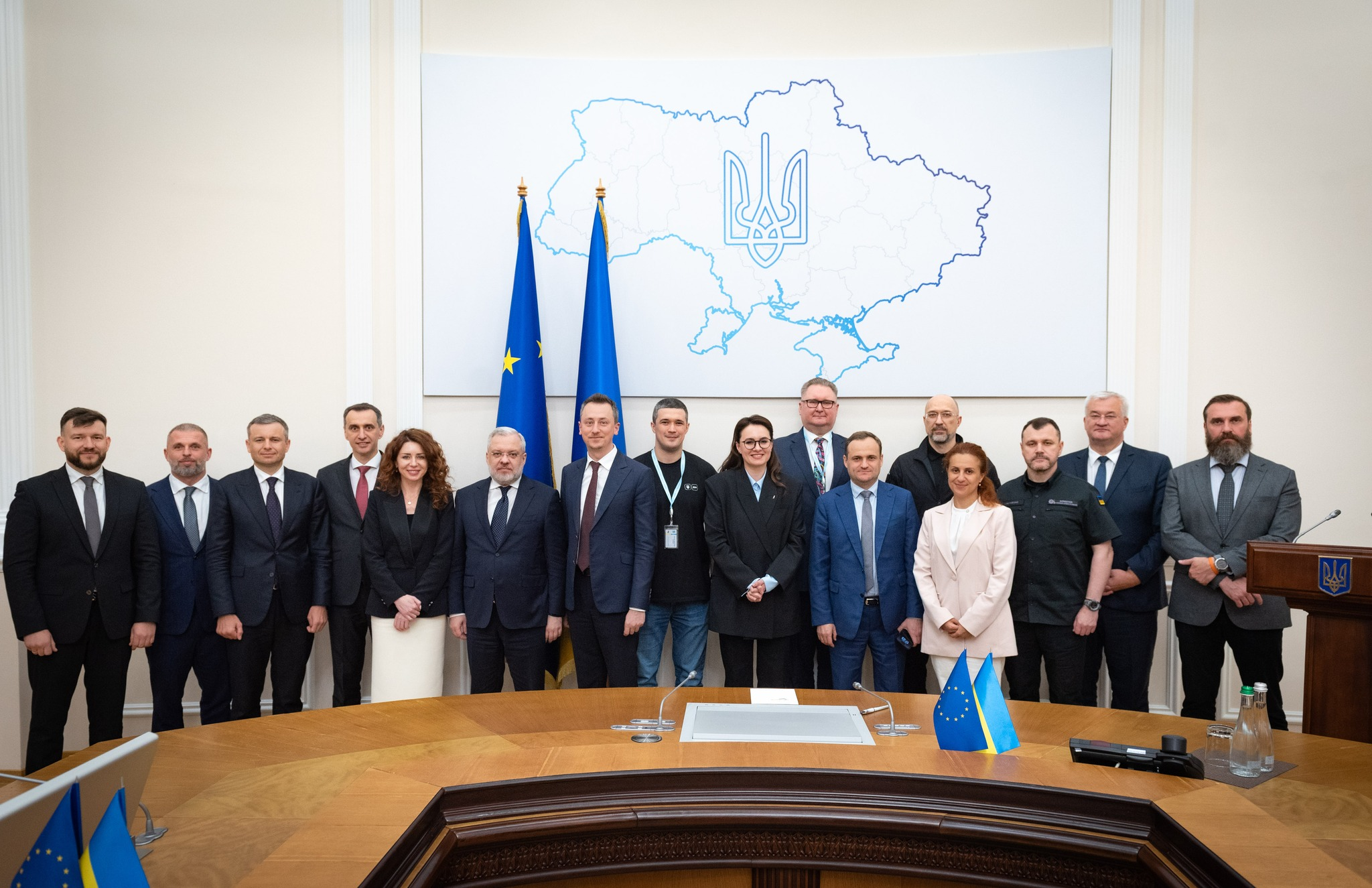
- Svyrydenko Government in 2025
- Date formed: 17 July 2025
- Date dissolved: 12 July 2026

People and organisations
- President: Volodymyr Zelenskyy
- Prime Minister: Yulia Svyrydenko
- First Deputy Prime Minister: Mykhailo Fedorov (2025–2026); Denys Shmyhal (2026)
- Deputy Prime Ministers: Oleksii Kuleba; Taras Kachka; Tetyana Berezhna
- No. of ministers: 17 (Note: Including the Prime Minister)
- Member party: Servant of the People
- Status in legislature: Majority government
- Opposition parties: European Solidarity; Batkivshchyna; Platform for Life and Peace; Holos; Restoration of Ukraine
- Opposition leaders: Petro Poroshenko; Yulia Tymoshenko; Yuriy Boyko; Kira Rudyk; Antonina Slavytska

History
- Election: 2019 Ukrainian parliamentary election
- Legislature term: IX Rada
- Predecessor: Shmyhal Government
- Successor: Koretskyi Government

The Svyrydenko government (Ukrainian: Уряд Юлії Свириденко, romanized: Uriad Yulii Svyrydenko) was the 22nd government of Ukraine, formed on 17 July 2025 and led by Yulia Svyrydenko, who was previously serving as First Deputy Prime Minister and the Minister of Economy in the Shmyhal Government. The government was dissolved on 12 July 2026 following Svyrydenko's dismissal and the creation of the Koretskyi Government.

== History ==
On 14 July 2025, President Volodymyr Zelenskyy announced that he proposed Yulia Svyrydenko to head the government of Ukraine, to "significantly renew its [Government's] work". The next day, following the meeting with Svyrydenko and Deputy Prime Minister and Minister of Digital Transformation Mykhailo Fedorov, Zelenskyy outlined the tasks and priorities for the first six months of the new government. Among them were the increase of domestic weaponry production, procurement of drones for the Armed Forces, deregulation, "unleashing the economic potential of Ukraine" and full implementation of social programs.

=== Appointment of Svyrydenko ===
The appointment of Svyrydenko as the Prime Minister of Ukraine was approved by the Verkhovna Rada on 17 July 2025. Svyrydenko was an acting First Deputy Prime Minister at the time of his appointment; she had previously served as Minister of Economy. 262 people's deputies, from the ruling Servant of the People faction, splinter groups of the banned Opposition Platform – For Life, as well as parliamentary groups like For the Future and Dovira, all voted for her candidacy. Present European Solidarity members voted against the nomination, while the majority of both Batkivshchyna and Holos deputies abstained.

Appointment vote Yulia Svyrydenko (Independent) (Note: Nominated by the Servant of the People)
Faction		For	Against	Abstained	Did not vote	Absent
Servant of the People	231	201	0	1	9	20
European Solidarity	27	0	21	0	1	5
Batkivshchyna	25	0	0	11	2	12
Platform for Life and Peace	21	15	0	0	0	6
Holos	20	1	1	10	3	5
Dovira	19	15	0	0	1	3
For the Future	17	12	0	1	1	3
Restoration of Ukraine	17	10	0	0	0	7
Independents	21	8	0	3	5	5
Total	398	262	22	26	22	66

=== Appointment of the government ===
Package vote
Faction		For	Against	Abstained	Did not vote	Absent
Servant of the People	231	194	2	4	10	21
European Solidarity	27	0	8	0	1	18
Batkivshchyna	25	0	0	11	3	11
Platform for Life and Peace	21	13	0	0	1	7
Holos	20	1	1	7	5	6
Dovira	19	15	0	0	0	4
For the Future	17	13	0	0	1	3
Restoration of Ukraine	17	10	0	0	0	7
Independents	21	7	2	1	5	6
Total	398	253	13	23	26	83

== Composition ==
Compared to the outgoing Shmyhal Government, the new government led by Yulia Svyrydenko includes a couple major differences: the Ministry of National Unity was merged into the Ministry of Social Policy, with the new ministry taking the name of Ministry of Social Policy, Family and Unity. The ministries of economy, agrarian policy and environmental protection were merged into a single Ministry of Economy, Environment and Agriculture, and the Ministry of Strategic Industries was merged into the Ministry of Defence.

Nine ministers from the outgoing government retained their positions in the new Cabinet of Ministers, among them Minister of Digital Transformation Mykhailo Federov, who became the First Deputy Prime Minister of Ukraine, Deputy Prime Minister for Restoration of Ukraine and the Minister for Development of Communities and Territories Oleksii Kuleba, Minister of Foreign Affairs Andrii Sybiha, Minister of Finance Serhiy Marchenko, Minister of Internal Affairs Ihor Klymenko, Minister of Education and Science Oksen Lisovyi, Minister of Youth and Sports Matvii Bidnyi and the Minister of Health Viktor Liashko.

Three more remained in government, but in different positions: Herman Halushchenko became the Minister of Justice, while former Svitlana Hrynchuk, who previously led Ministry of Environmental Protection and Natural Resources, replace Halushchenko, and became the new energy minister. Additionally, former Prime Minister Denys Shmyhal became the new defence minister.

Galushchenko and Hrynchuk were dismissed by parliament on 19 November 2025, amidst the Operation Midas scandal.

Office	Name	Took office	Left office	Party
Prime Minister	Yulia Svyrydenko	17 July 2025	Incumbent	Independent (SN)
First Deputy Prime Minister; Minister of Digital Transformation	Mykhailo Fedorov	17 July 2025	13 January 2026	SN
Deputy Prime Minister for European and Euro-Atlantic Integration of Ukraine	Taras Kachka	17 July 2025	Incumbent	Independent (SN)
Deputy Prime Minister for Restoration of Ukraine; Minister for Development of Communities and Territories	Oleksii Kuleba	17 July 2025	Incumbent	Independent (SN)
Minister of Foreign Affairs	Andrii Sybiha	17 July 2025	Incumbent	Independent (Note: Nominated by the President)
Minister of Defence	Denys Shmyhal	17 July 2025	13 January 2026	Independent
Minister of Justice	Herman Halushchenko	17 July 2025	19 November 2025	Independent (SN)
Minister of Finance	Serhiy Marchenko	17 July 2025	Incumbent	Independent (SN)
Minister of Internal Affairs	Ihor Klymenko	17 July 2025	Incumbent	Independent (SN)
Minister of Economy, Environment and Agriculture	Oleksii Sobolev	17 July 2025	Incumbent	Independent (SN)
Minister of Social Policy, Family and Unity	Denys Uliutin	17 July 2025	Incumbent	Independent (SN)
Minister of Education and Science	Oksen Lisovyi	17 July 2025	Incumbent	Independent (SN)
Minister of Youth and Sports	Matvii Bidnyi	17 July 2025	Incumbent	Independent (SN)
Minister of Health	Viktor Liashko	17 July 2025	Incumbent	Independent (SN)
Minister of Energy	Svitlana Hrynchuk	17 July 2025	19 November 2025	Independent (SN)
Minister of Veterans Affairs	Natalia Kalmykova	17 July 2025	Incumbent	Independent (SN)
=== Changes October 2025 ===
Office	Name	Took office	Left office	Party
Deputy Prime Minister for Humanitarian Policy; Minister of Culture	Tetiana Berezhna	21 October 2025	Incumbent	Independent (SN)
=== Changes November 2025 ===
Office	Name	Took office	Left office	Party
Acting Minister of Justice	Lyudmyla Suhak	19 November 2025	Incumbent	Independent
=== Changes January 2026 ===
Office	Name	Took office	Left office	Party
Minister of Defence	Mykhailo Fedorov	14 January 2026	Incumbent	SN
First Deputy Prime Minister; Minister of Energy	Denys Shmyhal	14 January 2026	Incumbent	Independent (SN)

== See also ==
- 9th Ukrainian Verkhovna Rada
