= Pavlo Yelizarov =

Ukrainian military officer (born 1968)

Pavlo Ielizarov
- Павло Єлізаров
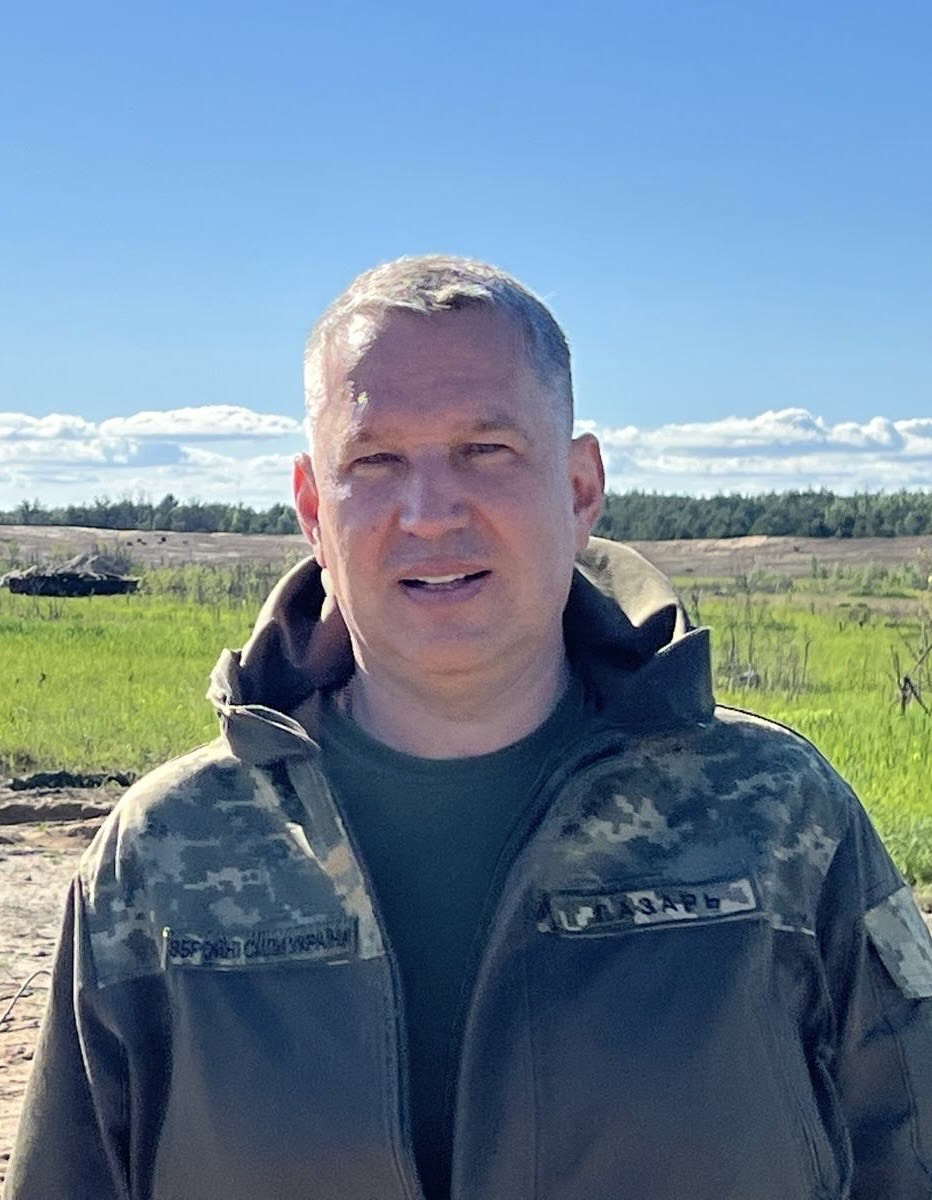
- Ielizarov in 2023
- Born: 12 October 1968 (age 58); Kishinev, Moldavian SSR, Soviet Union (now Moldova)
- Education: Ukrainian State University of Finance and International Trade
- Military career
- Allegiance: Ukraine
- Branch: Territorial Defense Forces (2022); Special Operations Forces (2022); National Guard of Ukraine (2022–2026); Ukrainian Air Force (2026)
- Service years: 2022–present
- Rank: Сolonel
- Nickname: Lasar (call sign)
- Units: 112th Territorial Defense Brigade (2022); Special Operations Forces (2022); 27th brigade of the National Guard of Ukraine (2022–2026); Ukrainian Air Force (2026)
- Conflicts: Russo-Ukrainian War; Russian invasion of Ukraine

Pavlo Oleksandrovych Ielizarov (Ukrainian: Павло Олександрович Єлізаров; born 12 October 1968) is the former Deputy Commander of the Ukrainian Air Force, businessman, television producer.

He is best known as the founder and commander of "Lasar's Group", a drone warfare unit credited with destroying large amounts of Russian military equipment. In response to the dismissal of Mykhailo Fedorov by Ukrainian President Zelenskyy, Ielizarov stepped down from his position as deputy commander of the air force in July 2026, writing in his resignation his intention to retire from the armed forces as a whole.

== Biography ==
Ielizarov was born in 1968 in Chișinău, in the Moldavian SSR of the Soviet Union (now Moldova). He studied in Chișinău from 1976 to 1984 at secondary school No. 17 in Chisinau. In 1988 he graduated with honors from the Chisinau Electromechanical Technical School and received a specialty in the "Production of electronic and electrical automation equipment". He then served in the Soviet Army before moving to Ukraine in the 1990s. In the 1990s and 2000s, he built an agribusiness company. From 2007 to 2008, he served as a deputy minister of transport.

Ielizarov then worked in Ukrainian television production. He was the producer and co-owner of the popular political talk show The Freedom of Speech hosted by Savik Shuster.

== Participation in the Russian-Ukrainian war ==
Immediately after the start of Russia’s full-scale invasion of Ukraine in 2022, Ielizarov joined Ukraine's territorial defense and later transferred to the Special Operations Forces, where he began to assemble and deploy drones. He subsequently formed "Lasar's Group" under the National Guard and became its commander. According to Ukrainian officials, Ielizarov's group has exhibited unusual success in destroying over $13 billion worth of Russian military equipment. According to the Wall Street Journal, Lasar's Group is now one of the largest and deadliest drone units in the world.

On 19 January 2026, President Volodymyr Zelenskyy announced Ielizarov's appointment as deputy commander of the Ukrainian Air Force as part of a broader overhaul of air defense emphasizing mobile fire groups and interceptor drones. Ukrainian officials said he would oversee development of "small" (short-range) air-defense systems and drone interception.

According to Simon Schuster from The Atlantic, a bootstrapped version of the Iron Dome is being deployed under the leadership of Pavlo Ielizarov that uses the latest air defense technologies, including a truck-mounted laser that can shoot down aircraft, a carbon-fiber clone of Russia's S-400, wheeled robots armed with chain-gun turrets, and a 3-D-printed interceptor called "the dildo drone", which has turned out to be the scariest of these weapons.

On 16 July 2026, Ielizarov stepped down from his position as deputy commander of the air force, citing the dismissal of Mykhailo Fedorov, the Minister of Defence and fellow advocate for drone warfare, by Ukrainian President Zelenskyy as his primary reason for leaving. According to The Kyiv Independent, Ielizarov stated in his resignation letter that the removal of Fedorov 'would cause more casualties and destruction in Ukraine from Russian missile and drone attacks'. He further stated his intentions to retire from the armed forces as a whole, including the reserves, and would focus on raising his children and taking care of his relatives in the immediate term.

== Awards ==
- Award of the President of Ukraine "For the Defense of Ukraine" – awarded by the President of Ukraine Volodymyr Zelenskyy on 5 August 2022.
- Order of Bohdan Khmelnytsky, 3rd degree – awarded by the President of Ukraine Volodymyr Zelenskyy on 19 June 2023.
- "Steel Cross" – awarded by the Commander of the Armed Forces of Ukraine Valerii Zaluzhnyi on 21 August 2023.
- "Silver Cross" – awarded by the Commander of the Armed Forces of Ukraine Oleksandr Syrskyi on 3 July 2024.
- "Cross of the Brave" – awarded by the Commander of the Armed Forces of Ukraine Oleksandr Syrskyi 25 March 2025.
- "Star of the Territorial Defense Forces" – awarded by the Commander of the Territorial Defense Forces of the Armed Forces of Ukraine Ihor Plakhuta on 23 June 2025.
- Award of the Minister of Defense of Ukraine "For Strengthening Defense Capability" – awarded by the Minister of Defense of Ukraine Rustem Umerov on 15 July 2025.

== Family ==
Ielizarov is married and has five children.
