= 2025 anti-corruption protests in Ukraine =

2025 anti-corruption protests
- Part of 2025 in the Russian invasion of Ukraine during the Russo-Ukrainian War and Gen Z protests
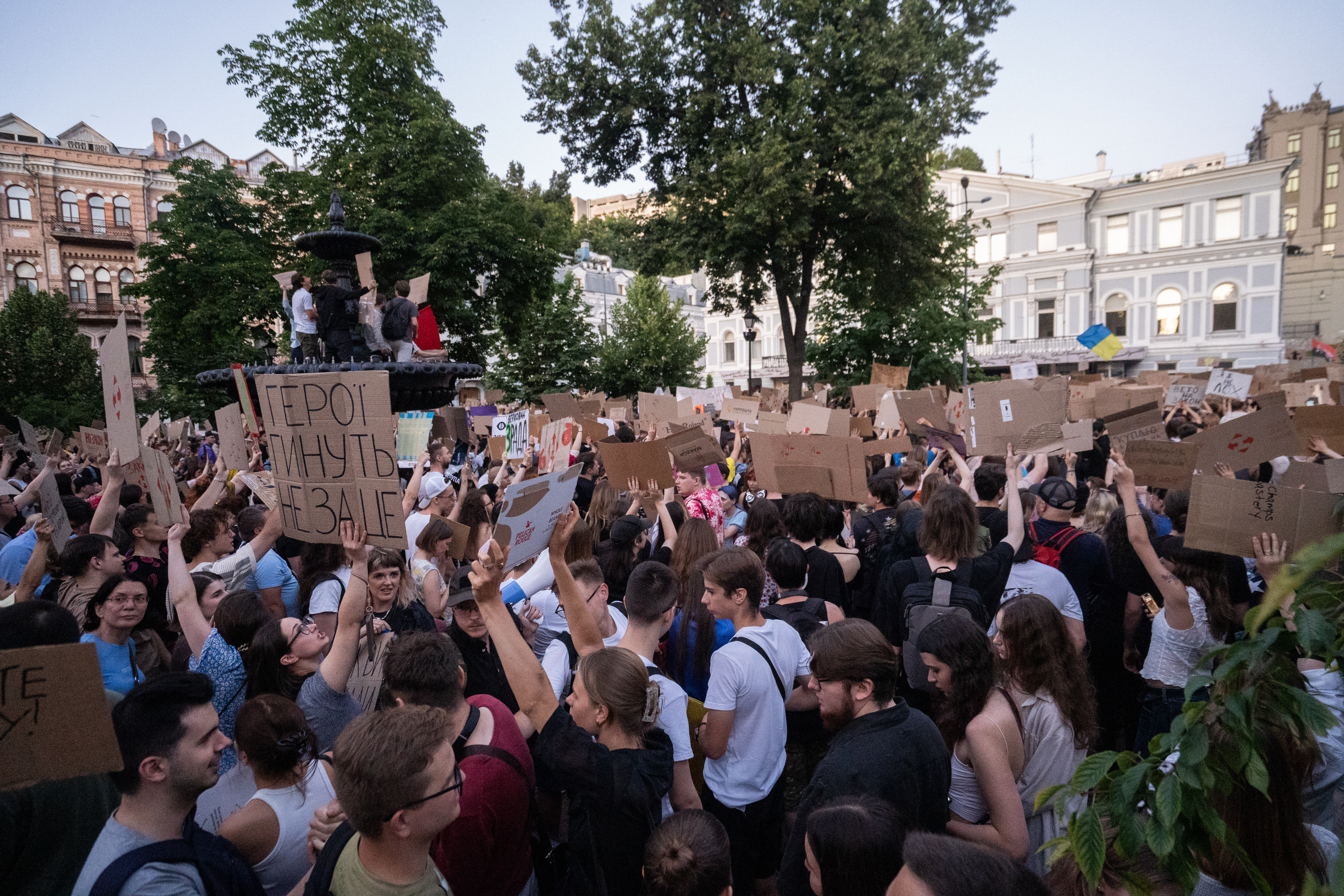
- Protests in Kyiv, 23 July 2025
- Date: 22 July – 31 July 2025 (9 days)
- Location: Kyiv, Kharkiv, Lviv, Dnipro, Odesa and other cities
- Caused by: Adoption of Bill No. 12414, which removed the independence of anti-corruption agencies
- Goals: Repealing the law
- Methods: Protests, online activism
- Result: Agencies' independence restored

Parties
| Civil society, activists NABU; SAP; Political parties: European Solidarity; Holos | Government; Political parties: Sluha Narodu; Batkivshchyna; PZZhM |

Lead figures
| | Volodymyr Zelenskyy |

Number
| 10,000–16,000 (in Kyiv) | |

From 22 to 31 July 2025, Ukrainians gathered in Kyiv, Odesa, Lviv, Dnipro and other cities to protest the passing of a bill that aimed to "effectively destroy" the power of two of Ukraine's anti-corruption bodies. These were the first anti-government demonstrations since the start of the 2022 Russian invasion of Ukraine. The event became known as Cardboard protests (Ukrainian: Картонкові протести), Cardboard meetings (Ukrainian: Картонкові мітинги) or Cardboard Maidan (Ukrainian: Картонковий майдан) due to the use of handmade posters by their participants.

On 31 July 2025, parliament passed a new bill that restored the agencies' independence.

== Background ==
On 21 July, law enforcement officers raided the offices of the National Anti-Corruption Bureau of Ukraine (NABU), to investigate 15 employees as part of an alleged investigation into traffic violations. Investigators, led by the Security Service of Ukraine (SBU) and Prosecutor's General Office, later said the investigation centered on a pro-Russian member of parliament suspected of treason.

On 22 July 2025, Ukraine's Verkhovna Rada passed a controversial law, Bill No. 12414, that stripped NABU and the Specialized Anti-Corruption Prosecutor's Office (SAPO) of independence and gave new powers to the Prosecutor General, Zelenskyy loyalist Ruslan Kravchenko. The bill was passed by the ruling Servant of the People party, with support from the opposition Batkivshchyna party and the Platform for Life and Peace; it was opposed by the liberal Holos party. The bill had originally been unrelated to NABU and SAPO, but the provisions were added as amendments after the bill had already passed the first reading.

Protests began soon after, demanding that Zelenskyy veto the bill. Despite widespread protests, Zelenskyy signed the law into power on the evening of 22 July and defended it on Telegram in his nightly address, saying that "the anti-corruption infrastructure will work ... NABU and SAPO will work", but without "Russian influences" that Zelenskyy said had to be removed.

Based on sources within parliament, law enforcement agencies, and the team of President Volodymyr Zelenskyy, Ukrainska Pravda reported that the plan against NABU and SAPO had been developed within the President's Office, particularly by head of the President's Office Andriy Yermak, after investigations against various figures that Ukrainska Pravda wrote upset Zelenskyy. The Economist wrote that the bill had been "orchestrated from the top" by Zelenskyy and Yermak.

Critics pointed out the law could have made it easier for the government to choose which corruption cases to prosecute. Critics also feared that this law may hurt Ukraine's efforts to join the European Union. EU officials called the law a "step back".

== Protests ==
On 22 July 2025, protesters gathered near the Ivan Franko Drama Theater after an appeal to "ordinary concerned citizens" by Dmytro Koziatynskyi, a war veteran.

According to estimates by Ukrainska Pravda and Hromadske, hundreds of people gathered in the capital city of Kyiv, while UNIAN reported there were a thousand people present. Protesters also gathered in other cities, including the second largest Ukrainian city Kharkiv, the largest city in western Ukraine Lviv, Dnipro, and Odesa. List of cities where protests occurred:

Protesters shouted "hands off NABU" and "shame," and criticized Zelenskyy and his administration. The protesters stated that the bill would destroy Ukrainian anti-corruption processes and institutions aimed at reducing corruption in government institutions. People began leaving as the midnight curfew began.

The demonstrators consisted largely of young people, who had been inspired by the Euromaidan protests but had not themselves participated.

Protests were still ongoing on 30 July, the day before parliament was scheduled to vote on a new bill to reverse Bill No. 12414.

Protests on July 23, 2025

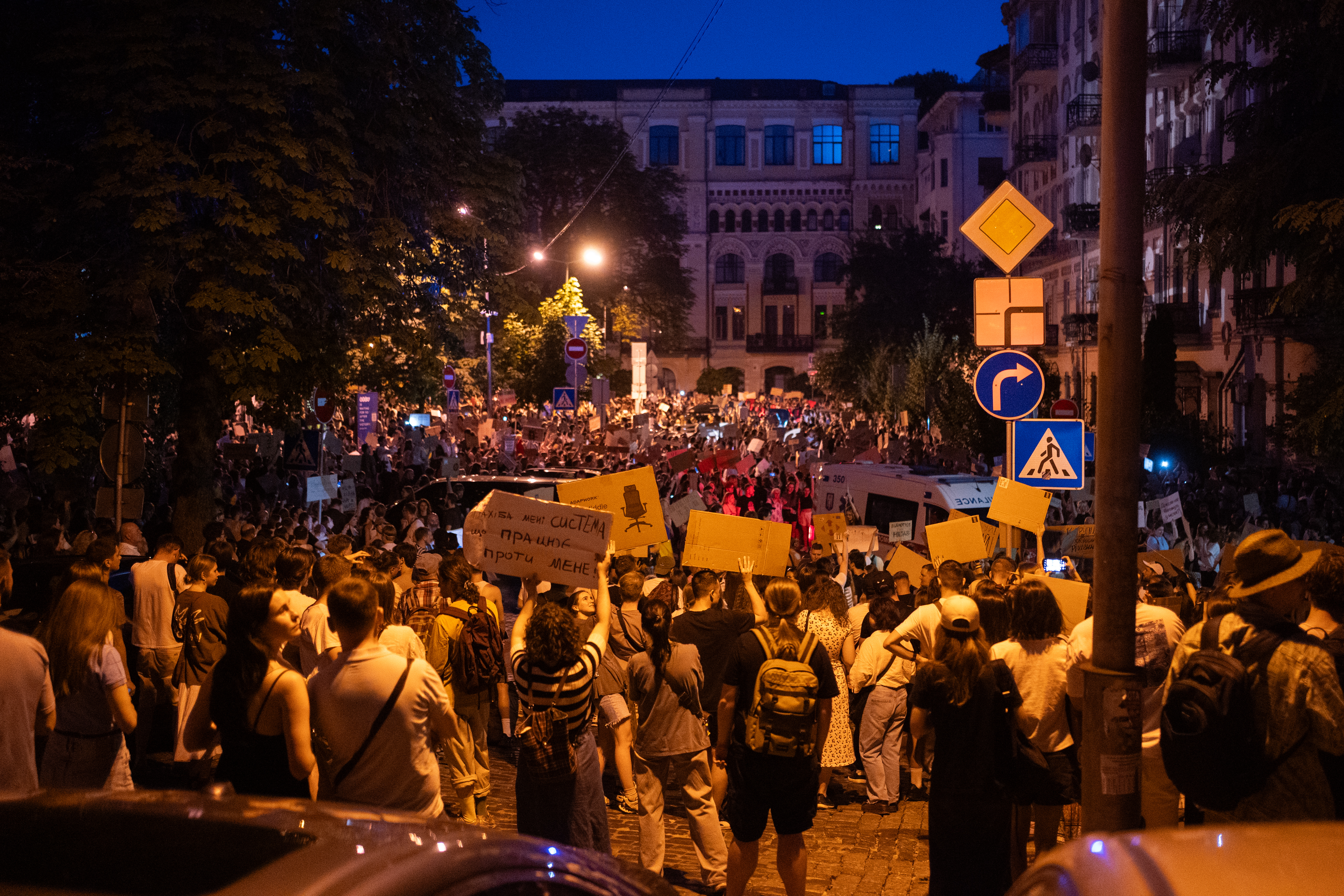
Protests in Kyiv #1

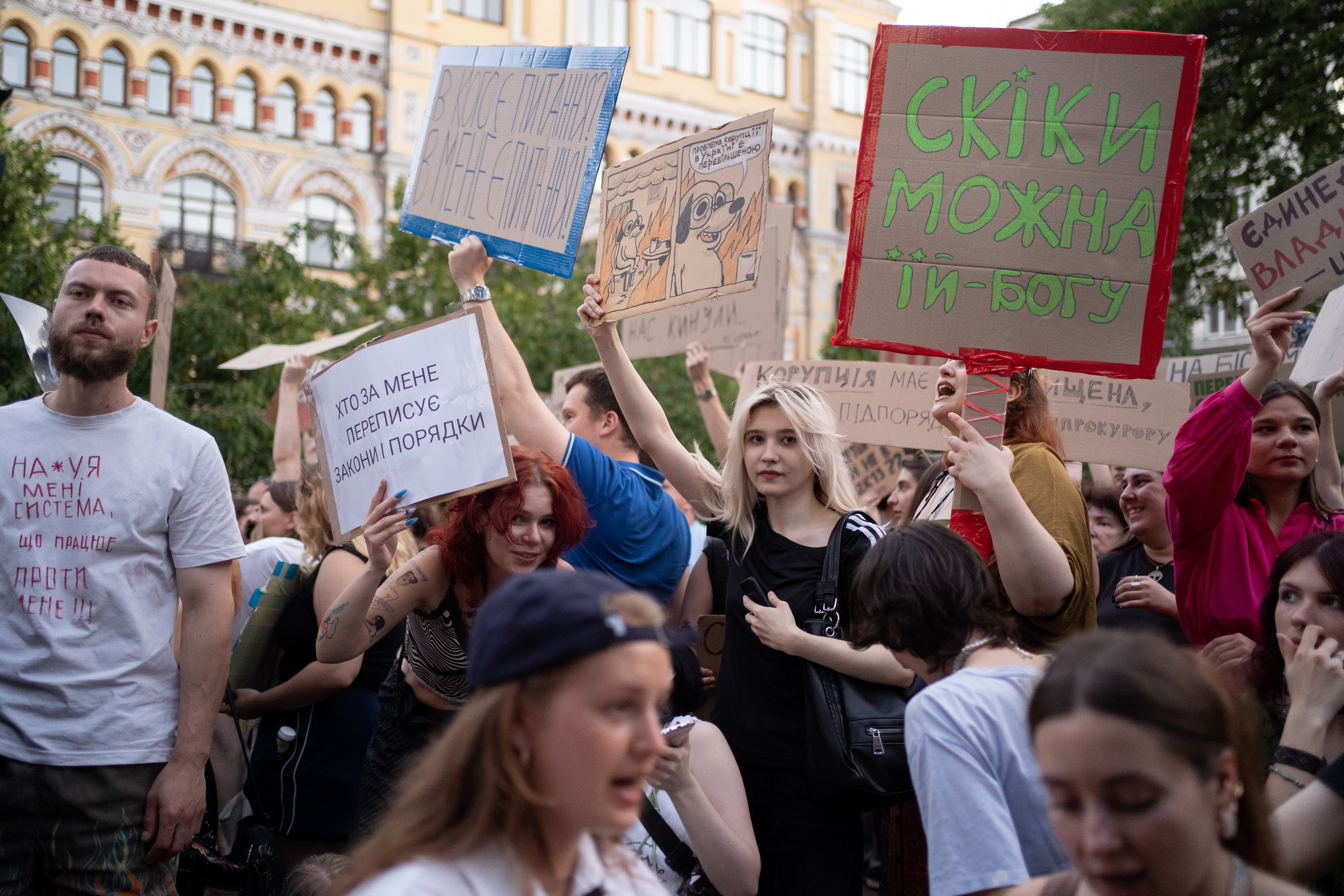
Protests in Kyiv #2

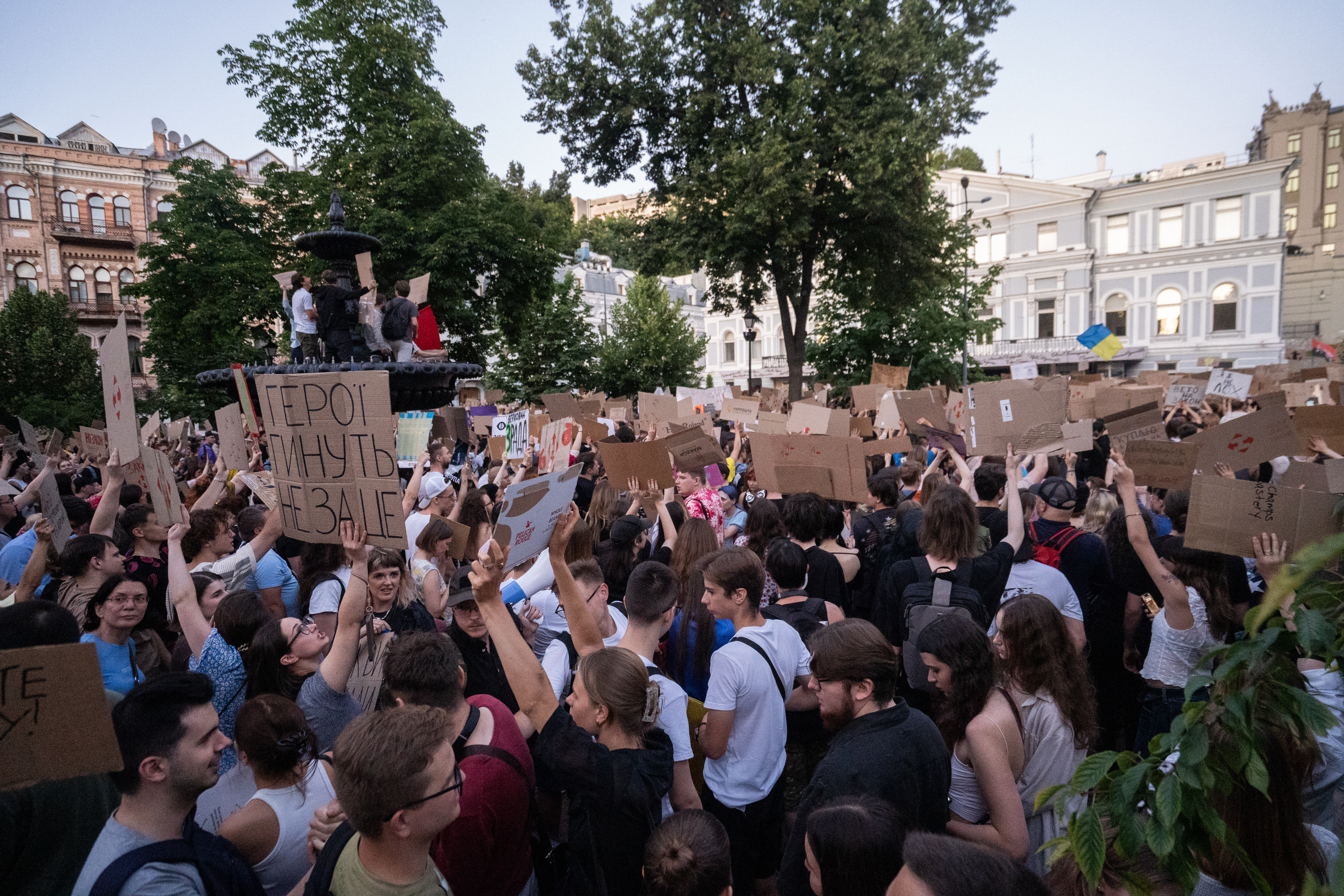
Protests in Kyiv #3

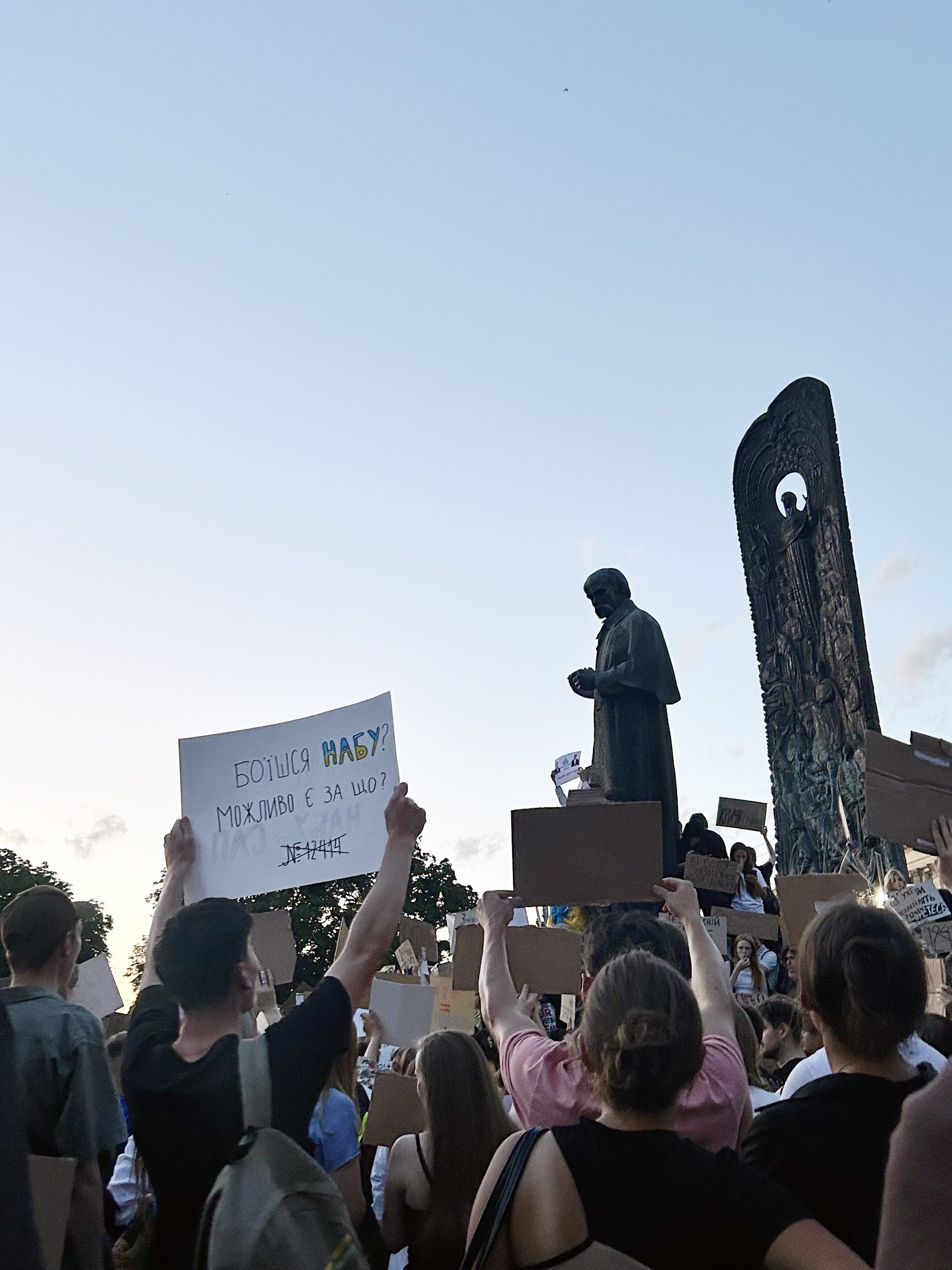
Protests in Lviv

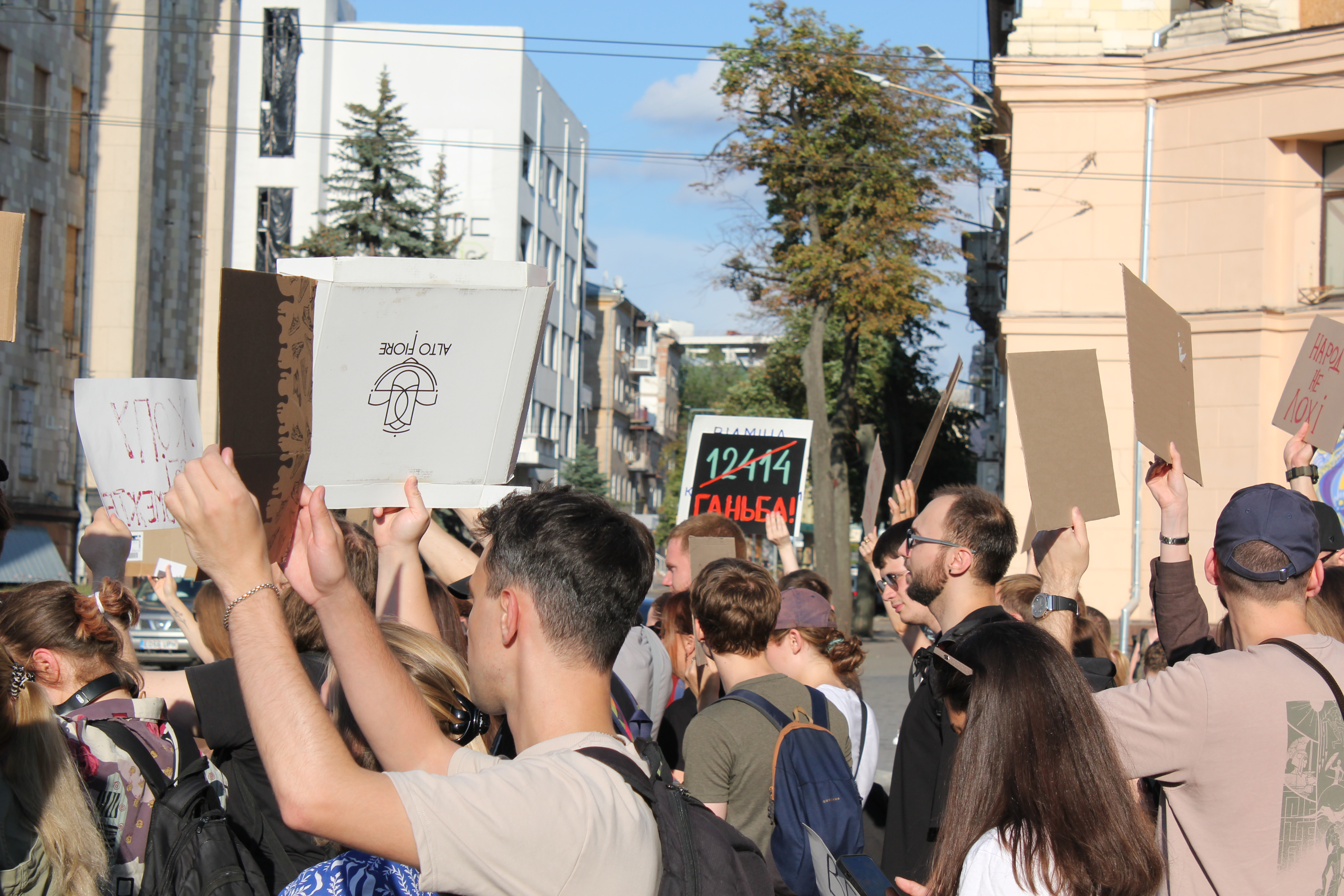
Protests in Kharkiv #1

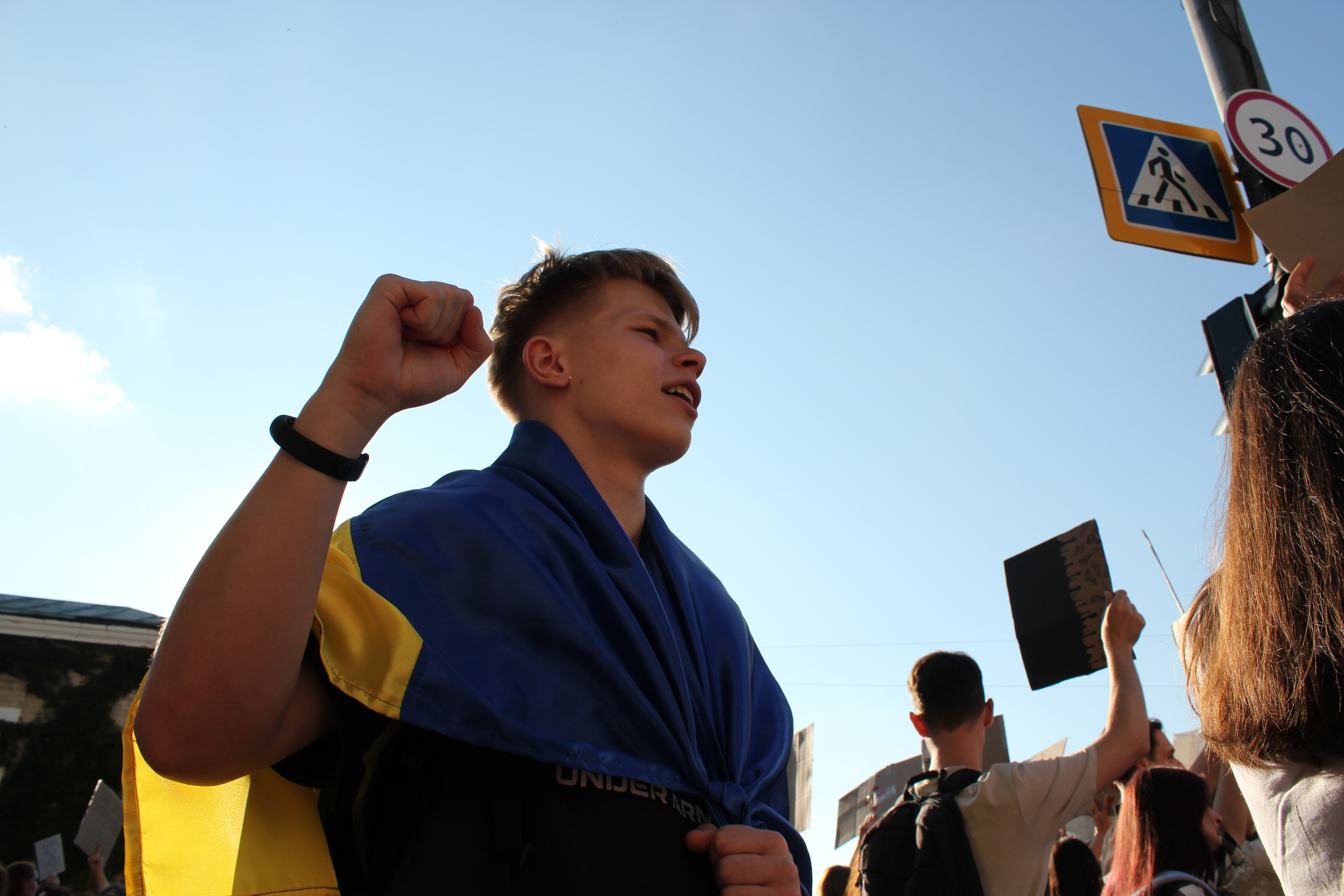
Protests in Kharkiv #2

== Aftermath ==
In response to the demonstrations, Zelenskyy announced on 23 July 2025 that he would submit a new draft law aimed at restoring the independence of NABU and SAPO, and submitted the bill the next day as Bill No. 13533. He stated that the new bill would protect the agencies from Russian influence while preserving their independence, though no details were given. NABU stated that the new bill restored both bodies' full powers and safeguards.

The new bill was adopted by parliament and signed by Zelenskyy on 31 July 2025; Zelenskyy said it was "very important that the state listens to public opinion". The adoption of Bill No. 13533 was celebrated by protesters who had gathered outside parliament during the vote, who chanted "the people are the power".

The day after on 1 August 2025, Ukrainska Pravda reported that the protests had "won and ended".

== See also ==
- Operation Midas
- Protests against the dismissal of Mykhailo Fedorov - also known as "Cardboard Maidan"
