= Sayenko =

Sayenko or Saienko (Ukrainian: Саєнко, Russian: Саенко) is a gender-neutral Ukrainian surname.

It may refer to:

- Aleksandr Sayenko (born 1978), Russian football player
- Inna Sayenko (born 1982), Ukrainian hammer thrower
- Mike Sayenko (born 1984), American long-distance runner
- Oleksandr Saienko (born 1984), Ukrainian businessman and politician
- Viktor Sayenko, one of Dnepropetrovsk maniacs
