= Mykhailo Rogalskyi =

- Михайло Вікторович Рогальський
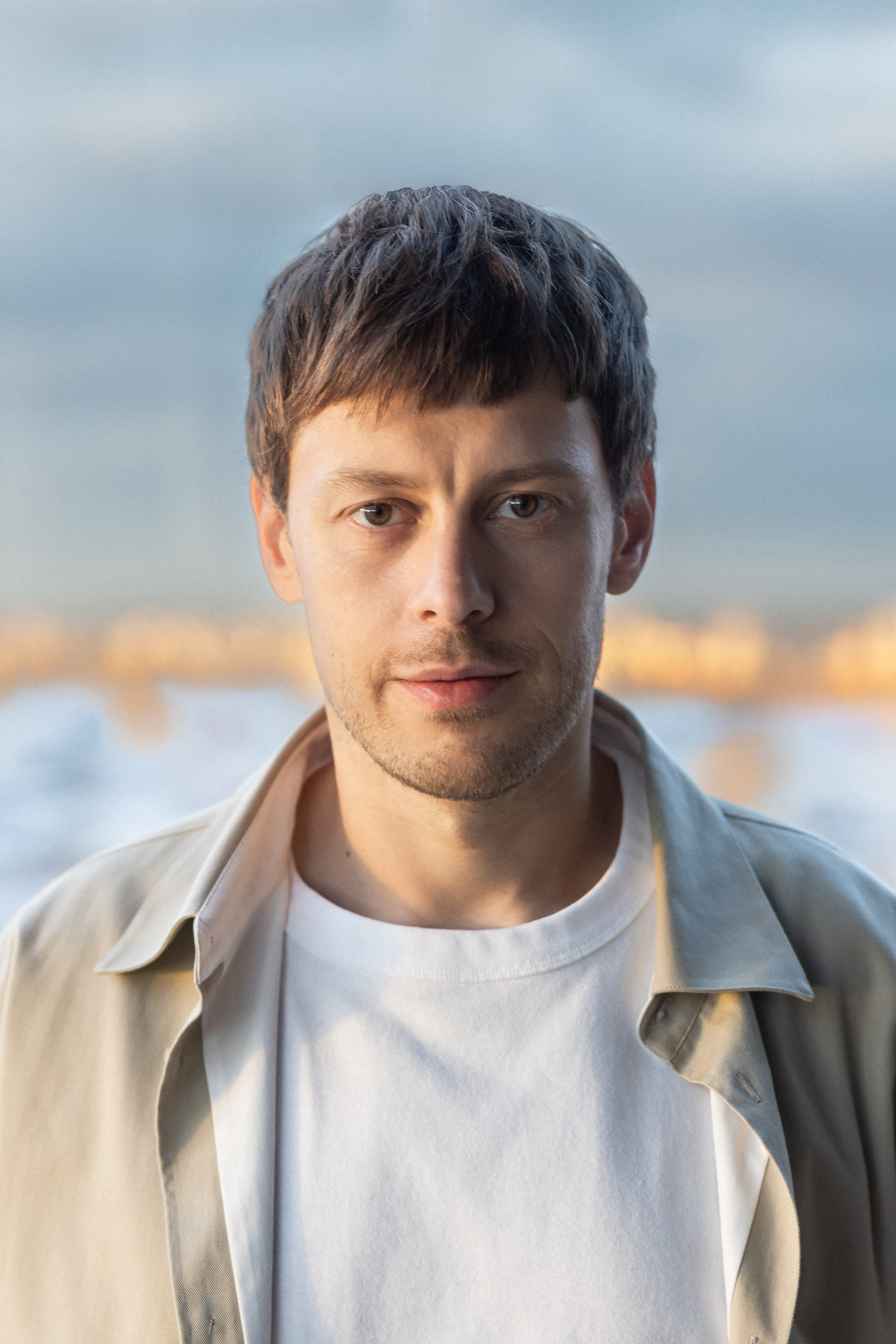
- Born: March 15, 1986 (age 40); Dnipro, Ukraine
- Citizenship: Ukraine
- Education: Institute of International Relations of Taras Shevchenko National University of Kyiv
- Occupations: Entrepreneur, Fintech expert
- Known for: Co-founder of monobank, Fintech-IT Group
- Awards: Medal "For Assistance to the Armed Forces of Ukraine"

Mykhailo Rogalskyi (Ukrainian: Михайло Вікторович Рогальський, born March 15, 1986, in Dnipro, Ukraine) is a Ukrainian fintech entrepreneur who co-founded monobank, Ukraine's digital banking platform.

== Early life and education ==
Rogalskyi was born on March 15, 1986, in Dnipro, Ukraine. Rogalskyi studied at the Institute of International Relations at Taras Shevchenko National University of Kyiv.

== Career ==
Rogalskyi began his professional career as the head of the online publication «Gazeta po-Kyivsky» (Kyiv Newspaper).

He then partnered with Dmytro Dubilet and Serhiy Danenko to establish Fine Web, a company focused on developing media projects including Gloss.ua, Formula 1.ua, and Tennis.ua. The company also launched a photobook production service under the FineBook brand.

In 2010, he joined PrivatBank, one of Ukraine's largest banks. During his tenure there, he held several senior positions, including Head of Payment Business, where he gained extensive experience in traditional banking operations and digital transformation. His final role at the bank was Head of Payments and Transfers.

Following PrivatBank's nationalization in 2016, Rogalskyi, along with Oleg Gorokhovsky and Dmytro Dubilet, founded Fintech Band. In 2017, the company partnered with Universal Bank to launch monobank, where he continues to serve as one of the key executives. In October 2025, monobank became Ukraine's first fintech unicorn, with the company's valuation exceeding US$1 billion following an international investment round.

Also, Rogalskyi was involved in the development of several international fintech ventures, including the British fintech project Koto (later rebranded as The Credit Thing) and the Polish fintech initiative Stereo. In February 2025, Rogalskiy launched a new app called Walkable.

As of 2026, Mykhailo Rogalsky, co-founder of the Fintech-IT Group holding, continues to develop mono products.

== Awards ==
In March 2024, Rogalskyi was awarded the Medal «For Support of the Armed Forces» by the Ministry of Defense of Ukraine.

In 2025, Mykhailo Rogalsky, together with Oleh Horokhovskyi, was included in the UP100 list in the 'Business' category.

== Personal life ==
Rogalskyi is married to Daria Bila, a theater artist and the author and illustrator of a series of children's books.
