= Mono cat (mascot) =

mono cat
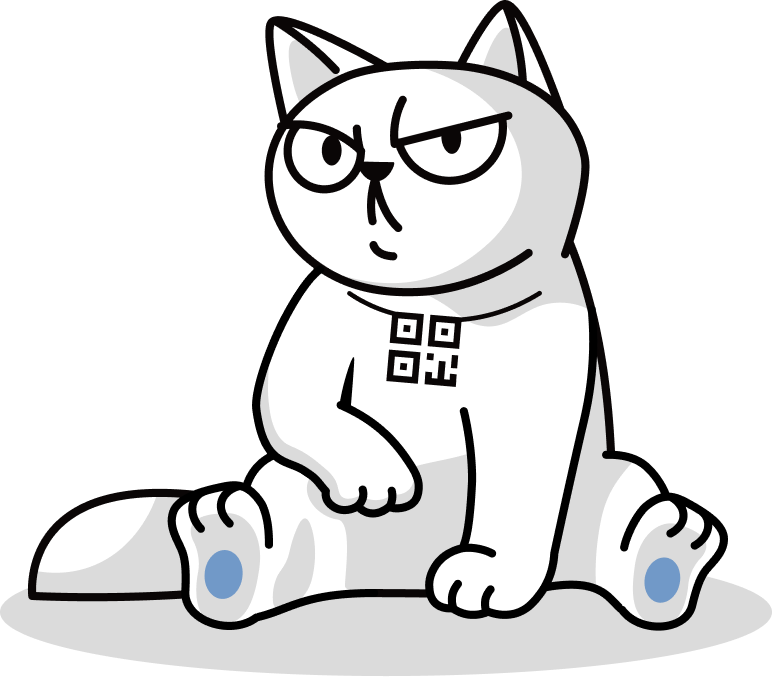
- Official mascot of monobank
- First appearance: 2017
- Created by: Fintech IT-Group

In-universe information
- Species: Cat
- Gender: Male
- Occupation: Brand mascot

The mono cat (Ukrainian: mono кіт) is the official mascot of the Ukrainian neobank monobank. Introduced in 2017, the character has become a central element of the brand's visual identity and communication strategy. Represented as an anthropomorphic cat, the mascot is used to facilitate a non-traditional, informal interaction between the financial service and its users.

== History ==
The character was conceived in 2017 during the development phase of monobank, Ukraine's first mobile-only bank. The inspiration for the mascot followed a viral social media post by co-founder Dmytro Dubilet, who shared a photograph of his pet cat in a specialized carrier backpack. The positive public perception prompted the development team at Fintech IT-Group (formerly Fintech Band) to adopt a feline theme to differentiate the brand from the formal aesthetics typical of the Ukrainian banking sector.

During the application's beta testing in November 2017, the mono cat was integrated as an animated assistant. In 2019, the company officially registered two trademarks featuring the character's likeness.

In September 2023, the bank introduced customizable avatars, allowing users to "dress" their personal mono cat by completing specific financial tasks. In July 2024, a "Shared Bill" feature was added for restaurants, where the mono cat acts as a randomizer to select which user pays the total check.

== Roles and functionality ==
The character is integrated across several functional areas of the service. Within the app interface, the mono cat appears during data loading, transaction processing, and in settings sections, serving as a visual guide and status indicator. It helps communicate system activity in a user-friendly and recognizable way without relying solely on text-based cues.

The character is also used in gamification, marketing, and educational content. Since 2019, the app has included a system of collectible achievements (“achievements”), each represented by the mono cat in different thematic styles, including historical, professional, and pop culture variations. By 2024, more than 100 unique versions of the character and its outfits had been created. In marketing, the character appears on stickers, collaborations, and merchandise included with issued payment cards, as well as on branded souvenirs. Additionally, it functions as a symbolic “author” in the knowledge base, presenting explanations of financial features and user instructions in an accessible format.

== Social initiatives ==
Following the 2022 Russian invasion of Ukraine, the role of the mono cat was expanded to support humanitarian and military fundraising. The character is used to visualize "Banka" (Ukrainian: Банки), digital crowdfunding jars used to collect donations for the Armed Forces of Ukraine and volunteer efforts.

In 2023, monobank launched major fundraising collaborations with the Come Back Alive foundation and the United24 platform (such as "Operation Unity"), offering limited-edition digital "skins" and badges for the mascot to incentivise donor participation.
