= Monobank =

Monobank may refer to:

- Monobank system, in which a single bank operates all financial intermediation in a given jurisdiction, e.g. in certain communist countries
- Monobank (Ukraine), a Ukrainian digital bank
