= Murder of Kateryna Handziuk =

2018 murder of a Ukrainian activist

- Died: 4 November 2018

Details
- Date: 31 July 2018
- Country: Ukraine
- Weapon: Application of sulfuric acid
- Imprisoned at: Sergei Torbin (6.6 years), Nikita Grabchuk (6 years), Vladimir Vasyanovich and Vyacheslav Vishnevsky (4 years), Viktor Gorbunov (3 years)

The murder of Kateryna Handziuk is a criminal offense committed against Ukrainian activist Kateryna Handziuk on 31 July 2018, outside her home in Kherson. The case received widespread publicity in Ukraine and remained unsolved until 2023 when two men were convicted of her murder.

== Progress of event ==
On 31 July 2018, around 8:30 am, an unknown person poured sulfuric acid on Kateryna Handziuk. The attack occurred near her home while she was on her way to work.

Gandzyuk was taken to the intensive care unit of the regional hospital in a state of shock. The burns amounted to more than 40% of her body. The acid got on her back, head, hand, and eyes.

On 4 November 2018, Handziuk died. The official cause of death was multiple organ failure and chemical burns involving 39% of the body due to an attack with a chemical substance.

== Investigation ==
Initially a criminal case was opened under Part 4, Article 296 of the Criminal Code (hooliganism), later the crime was reclassified to intentional grievous bodily harm, committed to intimidate the victim (Part 2, Article 121). Subsequently, the case was reclassified to "attempted murder with particular cruelty. Yevheniia Zakrevska, Handziuk's lawyer, succeeded in having the murder classified as an assassination. After Handziuk's death, the police reclassified the case to the article "Premeditated murder" of the Criminal Code of Ukraine.

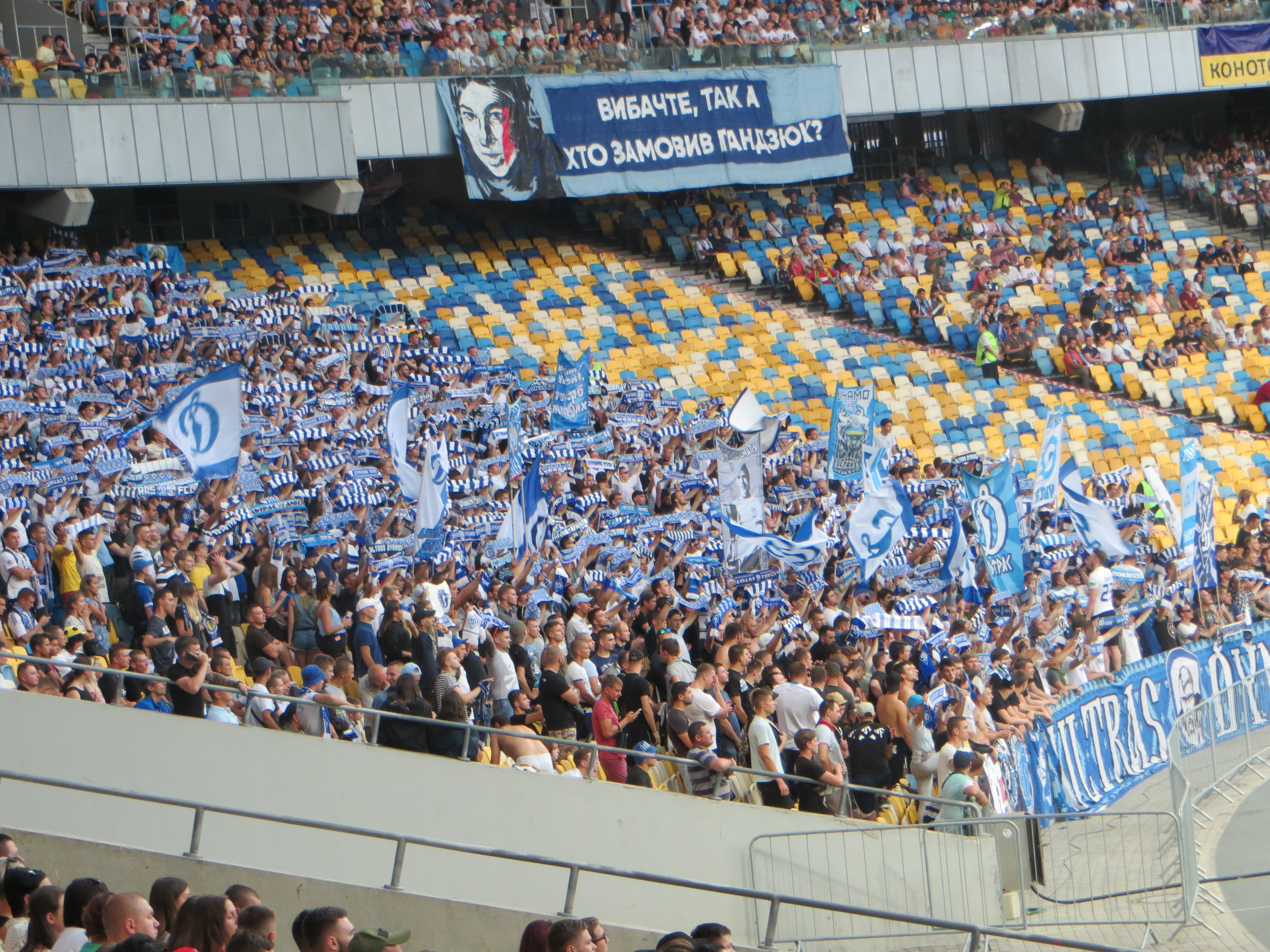
Dynamo Kyiv fans with a banner demanding investigation of the attack on Handziuk during a UEFA Champions League match in August 2018

On 1 August 2018, Handziuk was rushed by air ambulance to Kyiv and provided with state protection.

Due to the distrust of the Kherson police and suspicion of her involvement in the attack, Handziuk refused to cooperate with them. Instead, on 2 August 2018, she testified to operatives of the Department of Strategic Investigation (DSI), who visited Handziuk at her place of treatment in the Kyiv Burn Center.

As of early August 2018, the search for the attacker continued. A sketch of the attacker was drawn up and a reward was announced for any information identifying him. Prosecutor general of Ukraine Yuriy Lutsenko took under his control the criminal proceedings regarding the attack on Kateryna Handziuk. The most likely reason for the attack is believed to be Handziuk's public activities.

On 3 August 2018, interior minister Arsen Avakov announced the arrest of the suspect in the attack on Handziuk, who turned out to be Nikolai Novikov. On 6 August 2018, the Kherson City Court selected a preventive measure for the suspect in the form of detention. Subsequently, Novikov was found not to have been involved in the crime.

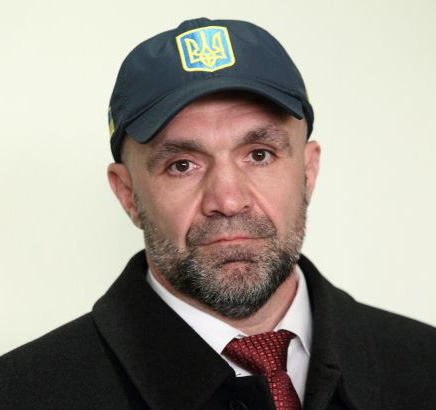
Vladislav Manger, convicted of ordering the attack on Kateryna Handziuk.

On 17 August 2018, two citizens of Ukraine were detained, who, according to the investigation, are accomplices in the organization of the assassination attempt – Vladimir Vasyanovich and Sergey Torbin. The prosecutor noted that the evidence of other participants in the case – Gorbunov, Grabchuk and Vishnevsky – indicated them as accomplices in the attempt on Handziuk's life. All the perpetrators are former participants in combat operations in Donbas region, scouts of the fifth battalion of the Ukrainian Volunteer Army. On 21 August 2018, the Kherson city court decided to detain for 60 days without the right to bail for both.

On 11 February 2019, Manger, head of the Kherson Regional Council, was announced as being suspected of organizing the murder of Handziuk.

On 15 February 2019, the Shevchenkivskyi Court of Kyiv arrested Manger until 3 March with the right to bail. The amount of bail was ₴2,497,000. On 28 February, during the interim report of the HSC in the Verkhovna Rada (Ukrainian parliament), it was decided to extend the HSC for another three months.

On 6 March 2019, Shevchenko district court suspended Manger from his duties as chairman of the Kherson regional council by 6 April 2019. Subsequently, the court refused to take Manger into custody and obliged him to wear an electronic tracking device.

On 20 January 2020, during a special operation in Kherson, searches were conducted in the homes of Kherson Regional State Administration chairman Manger, former Kherson Regional State Administration chairman Andrei Gordeev, and his deputy Yevhen Rischuk. During the operation, Igor Pavlovsky, a former aide to MP Nikolai Palamarchuk, was detained and reported as a suspect. Pavlovskyy was suspected of organizing the murder of Handziuk.

== Convictions for murder ==
In June 2023 the former head of the council for Kherson Oblast, Vladyslav Manher, was found guilty of ordering the attack on Handziuk. His assistant, Oleksii Levin, was found guilty of arranging it. Each man was sentenced to 10 years in prison – the maximum penalty for that offence. They were also fined ₴15 million ($406,000) as compensation to her husband and parents.

== See also ==
- Kateryna Handziuk
- Georgiy Gongadze
