= Avakov is the devil =

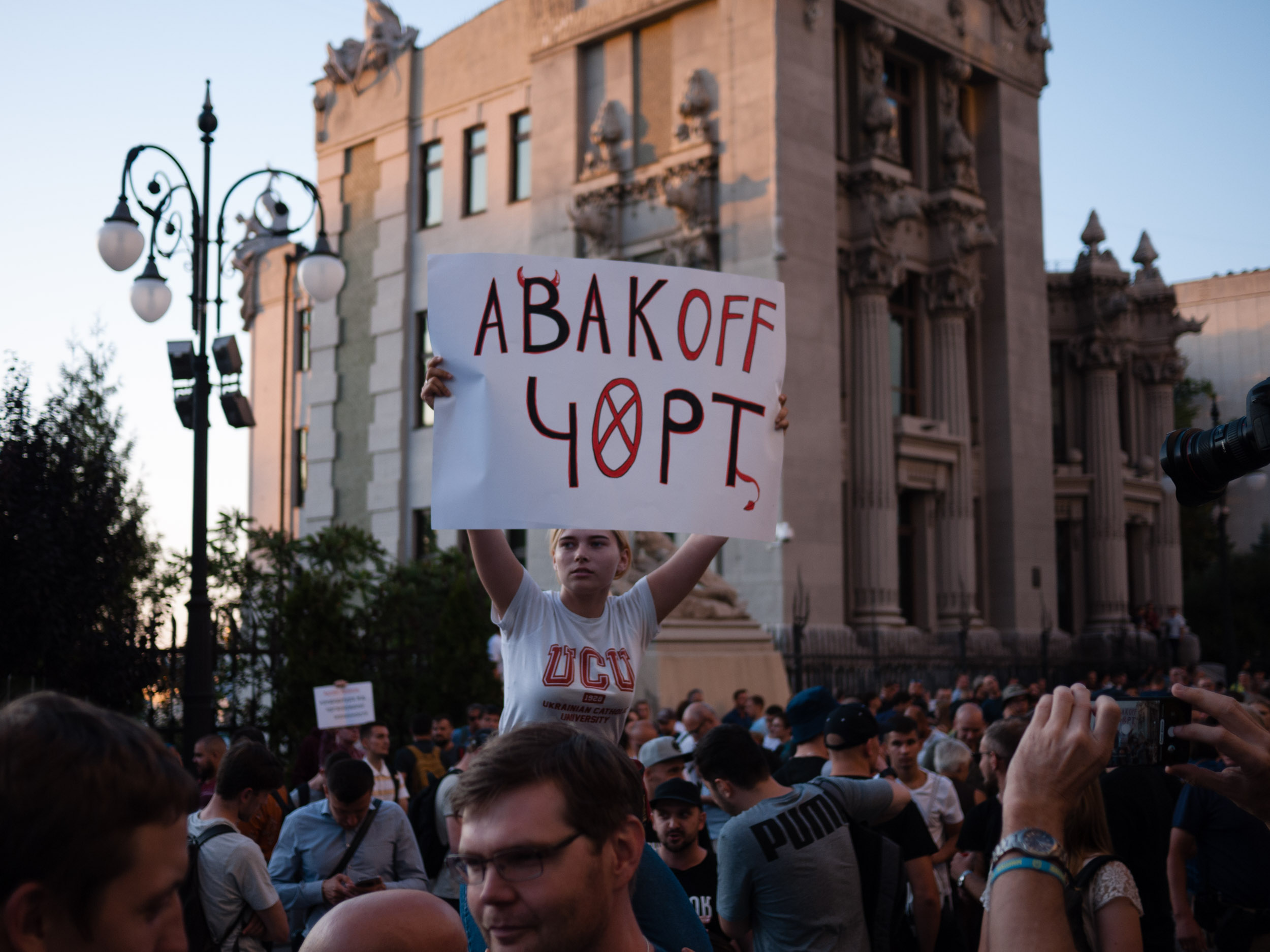
A protester in Kyiv holding a sign with the slogan, August 28, 2019

Avakov is the devil (Ukrainian: Аваков — чорт) was a slogan used during a series of protests in Ukraine against Minister of Internal Affairs Arsen Avakov, which took place from 2019 through 2021. The primary demand of the protesters was to remove Avakov from the Ministry of Internal Affairs, with the slogan being displayed during rallies held on August 28, 2019, as a result of President Volodymyr Zelenskyy's decision to retain Avakov in the Honcharuk Government.

== Etymology ==
The name comes from a combination of two words: Avakov (Ukrainian: Аваков, Minister of Internal Affairs) and "devil" (Ukrainian: чорт, a slang word that came from prison culture).

According to the Ukrainian mass media, the "Avakov is the devil" meme was launched in the public space by Roman Sinitsyn, a volunteer and public activist.

== Background ==
On March 25, 2014, public activist Oleksandr Muzychko was killed by internal affairs authorities.

On March 27, 2014, the Rivne City Council declared the death of Oleksandr Muzychka a political murder and called on the Minister of Internal Affairs, Arsen Avakov, to resign.

On March 31, 2014, the Lutsk City Council declared the death of Oleksandr Muzychka a political murder and called on the Minister of Internal Affairs, Arsen Avakov, to resign.

On February 7, 2016, Mykhailo Medvedev was killed by the police.

On February 10, 2016, relatives of Mykhailo Medvedev picketed the Department of the Patrol Service with the slogan "We are against murderous cops!".

On February 13, 2016, protests against such police actions took place.

On May 31, 2019, the 5-year-old child of Kyrylo Tlyavov was shot dead by police officers.

On June 3, 2019, Kyrylo Tlyavov died.

On June 4, 2019, protest actions demanding the resignation of Arsen Avakov were held throughout Ukraine.

According to public activists, experts and mass media, during his tenure as a minister, Avakov assumed many powers. This applies, for example, to his intervention in the case of Serhiy Sternenko, which is being investigated by the Prosecutor General's Office and the Security Service of Ukraine. Also, according to Sternenko, the pro-Russian oligarchs Medvedchuk and Avakov are responsible for the attacks on him.

The lack of investigations of attacks against public activists and journalists, and first of all the investigation of the murder of Kateryna Handziuk, also serves as the reason for the series of actions "Avakov is the devil".

== Protests against Avakov ==
The first action took place on August 28, 2019, near the President's Office, when it became known that Avakov will head the Ministry of Internal Affairs in the newly appointed Honcharuk government.

On February 23, 2020, as a result of the excessive involvement of the Minister of Internal Affairs in solving problems related to the coronavirus, activists gathered in Kyiv for the "Get Avakovirus" campaign, which became part of the "Avakov is the devil" campaign.

June 5, 2020— during Avakov's report to the Parliament of Ukraine regarding the investigation into the police rape of a woman in Kaharlyk and the shooting in Brovary with the participation of 100 people, activists gathered in front of the Parliament under the slogans "Avakov is the devil".

May 18, 2020 — as part of protests against the imprisonment of activist Serhiy Sternenko, protesters gathered in Kyiv under the slogans "Avakov is the devil".

On June 18, 2020 — activists gathered for a rally outside the Verkhovna Rada, demanding Avakov's release from the office.
