= Monobank (Ukraine) =

Ukrainian neobank licensed by Universal Bank (Ukraine)

monobank

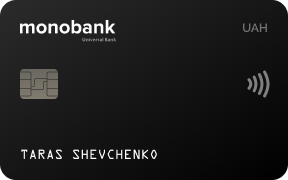
- monobank card
- Developer: Fintech-IT Group
- Release: 2017; 9 years ago
- Stable release: 7.20.0 / 27 February 2026; 7 months ago
- Operating system: Android, iOS
- Available in: 2 languages
- List of languages Ukrainian, English.
- Type: Banking
- Website: monobank.ua

monobank (Ukrainian: монобанк) is a Ukrainian neobank founded in 2017. It provides financial services through a mobile application without physical branches. As of 2025, it serves approximately 10 million customers. It is developed by Fintech-IT Group and operates on the basis of Universal Bank, which is controlled by businessman Serhiy Tihipko.

As of January 1, 2025, according to the National Bank of Ukraine, the number of active monobank cards reached 9.77 million. The bank has held second place among Ukrainian banks by this metric for the second consecutive year, having first reached this position in September 2023.

monobank also ranked third among Ukrainian banks by the volume of attracted deposits, with total deposits amounting to nearly 108 billion hryvnias ($2.5 billion USD).

== History ==
Work on the monobank product began in January 2017. From October 17 to November 22 of the same year, the service operated in beta testing mode, with over 17,000 users participating. The product was developed by Fintech-IT Group, a company set up by three former PrivatBank executives, Oleg Gorokhovskyi, Mykhailo Rogalskyi and Dmytro Dubilet, who left the bank after its nationalisation in December 2016.

The official launch of monobank took place on November 22, 2017. The service was built on the basis of Universal Bank, part of the TAS Group of Ukrainian businessman Serhiy Tihipko. The bank initially focused on app interface simplicity and accessibility, application's interface was designed by Alty. As of December 2018, monobank had around 600,000 users.

=== 2018 ===
The service introduced Shake2Pay, a feature that enables peer-to-peer (P2P) transfers by shaking two smartphones near each other. The devices detect one another automatically and open a transfer interface, allowing users to send money without entering card numbers or selecting contacts.

In August 2018, monobank introduced a deposit product called "Sports Deposit." Under the terms of this deposit, the depositor had to walk 10,000 steps daily throughout the entire deposit period to receive an increased interest rate. Initially, the rate was 21% per annum but was later reduced to 17%. If the client failed to meet the established step count for four consecutive days, the rate decreased to 15% (initially 12%).

=== 2019 ===
In September 2019, Dmytro Dubilet, co-founder of monobank and Fintech Band, left the project due to his appointment as Minister of the Cabinet of Ministers of Ukraine in Oleksiy Honcharuk's government. In his new position, he worked on implementing electronic services and reducing bureaucratic procedures.

On September 25, 2019, monobank introduced the "Rewards" section in its mobile application. The section gives users animated badges for completing actions in the app.

On October 11, 2019, monobank began issuing payment cards without a printed number, CVV code or expiration date, with the card details available only in the mobile application.

=== 2020-2021 ===
In March 2020, monobank began issuing children's cards for kids aged 6 to 14 years. Only parents who are clients of the bank can apply for such a card. The distinctive feature of the children's card is the parental control function, which allows setting limits on various operations, such as cash withdrawals, card top-ups by third parties, entertainment expenses, and online purchases. This gives parents the ability to control their children's financial expenses and teach them financial literacy.

On October 19, 2021, monobank co-founder Oleg Gorokhovsky announced the launch of a feature to obtain an eSIM from the lifecell operator directly through the mobile application. This service allows users to install an eSIM with one click on iOS devices or via a QR code on Android. The advantages of eSIM include the absence of a physical SIM card, protection against physical damage, and the ability to manage the number through the monobank application, including changing tariffs and setting up regular payments to top up the account.

=== 2022 ===
In January 2022, monobank planned to launch a stock trading service aimed at non-qualified investors. It was anticipated that users would be able to invest amounts from $10 to $50,000 in companies included in the S&P 500 index. A separate application called mono invest was developed for this purpose, with beta testing beginning on January 24, 2022. However, due to the start of the full-scale war in Ukraine on February 24, 2022, stock trading was temporarily suspended by decision of the National Securities and Stock Market Commission.

On September 14, 2022, monobank co-founder Oleg Gorokhovskyi announced the decision to remove the Russian language from the application interface.

=== 2023 ===
In September 2023, monobank added a customisable cat avatar to its reward system.

In September, monobank launched the software-based cash register service check by mono in partnership with Checkbox for sole proprietors, providing receipt issuing, inventory management, and payment acceptance via terminals/NFC/QR with a 1.3% fee.

In October, monobank, in collaboration with the ATB supermarket chain, launched the co-branded mono x ATB card. The card provides additional discounts on ATB products and cashback on products from mono.

=== 2024 ===
In spring 2024, monobank presented an updated version of its mobile application — monobank 2.0.

In September 2024, monobank, in partnership with the WOG gas station chain, launched the Shake2Pay function that allows customers to make quick and contactless payments for fuel directly through the monobank mobile application. To use this function, the user needs to open the app, shake the smartphone to activate Shake2Pay, select the appropriate WOG gas station, specify the pump number, type and amount of fuel, and then make the payment. This integration simplifies the refueling process, allowing customers to avoid queues and direct contact with staff. Additionally, monobank added the ability to connect the PRIDE loyalty card from WOG to its application.

monobank launched Group Expenses similar to Split Wise. There are also convenient debt reminders for those who haven't settled up yet.

On October 21, 2024, monobank opened its own marketplace called "market by mono" (later as monomarket). At launch, the platform offered about 20,000 products in the categories of gadgets, smart electronics, and computer equipment from partners such as Moyo, KTS, and Click. Shoppers gained the ability to compare prices from different sellers and make purchases without overpayments using the Split Payments that works as BNPL (Buy Now, Pay Later) service.

In November 2024, references to monobank were included in the video game S.T.A.L.K.E.R. 2: Heart of Chornobyl, and the bank released themed avatar skins for clients who bought the game.

=== 2025 ===
In March, a pilot project titled “Secret Boxes” was launched in partnership with the Expirenza platform, allowing food service establishments to sell discounted meal sets at the end of the day in order to reduce food waste.

In the same month, banking, as the main partner, financed the creation of the barrier-free performance pavilion “KYT” (in English: Whale) at VDNG in Kyiv, designed as an accessible venue for artists’ performances.

In April, beta testing began for monoKEP, a qualified electronic signature service that enabled entrepreneurs to use a digital signature directly within the app for interactions with government authorities.

In July, the bank launched Tap to Pay on iPhone, enabling merchants to accept contactless payments without additional hardware.

In August, monobank introduced its own network of self-service payment terminals (1,200 units at launch), allowing customers to top up cards without commission fees.

In the autumn, monobank completed beta testing of the monomarket platform and in September launched an advertising campaign with a budget of 200 million hryvnias. In the same month, the bank updated its public dashboard (monobank.ua/dashboard), adding the ability to track turnover of top businesses for a selected period.

In October, monobank launched the gamified campaign “Hunt for Lemons” to mark reaching 10 million customers. Inzhur REIT joined the prize fund, contributing cars and an apartment. A separate “AFU Lemon” worth 3 million hryvnias was raffled to fund the purchase of drones for the Armed Forces of Ukraine.

In November, joint cards for managing family budgets and shared expenses were introduced, allowing up to five co-owners per card.

In December, monobank launched in beta mode monobazaar, a marketplace platform enabling verified customers to buy and sell used goods.

In October 2025, Fintech-IT Group, the developer of monobank, received an investment from the Ukraine-Moldova American Enterprise Fund, a fund set up by the US Congress, at a valuation of $1 billion and became the first Ukrainian fintech unicorn.

== Concept and overview ==
monobank has no branches and provides its services through a mobile application. Accounts can be opened remotely using documents from the Diia app or a photo of a passport. The service operates on the basis of Universal Bank and is owned jointly by Universal Bank and by Gorokhovskyi and Rogalskyi through the company Kilobyte1024. Cash operations in foreign currency are carried out at Universal Bank cash desks or at partner banks.

=== Jar (Banka) ===
Jar (Banka) is a savings service from monobank, launched in 2019. The feature allows users to set aside money from everyday expenses into a separate account and use it for planned purchases.

In 2022, after the start of the full-scale war, Jar (Banka) unexpectedly gained widespread use for collecting funds for military and humanitarian needs. The Jar (Banka) link proved faster and more convenient than traditional fund requisites.

In response to this change in usage scenario, monobank simplified the replenishment process by adding Apple Pay, Google Pay, the ability to top up from other banks' cards without fees, and a unique card number for each Jar (Banka). This made the service a key fundraising tool in Ukraine. The service is improved daily: adding raffles among donors, smartphone widgets, social media templates, and IBAN details.

In May 2024, monobank created the "Friendly Collections" feature. This is a format where many people collect funds for one goal, dividing the total collection amount among themselves into their small Jars (Bankas).

=== monobusiness ===
On July 22, 2024, monobank launched monobusiness, a service for legal entities.

== Charity ==
In February 2024, monobank, together with Ihor Lachenkov, Serhii Sternenko and the UNITED24 platform, raised 309 million hryvnias to purchase 35 Sea Baby naval drones.

In June, the bank, in cooperation with the Serhii Prytula Charitable Foundation and the Sternenko Community Foundation, raised 160 million hryvnias to procure 1,000 night-vision devices.

In July, monobank and UNITED24 conducted a fundraiser that collected 300 million hryvnias for the restoration of the National Children’s Specialized Hospital “Okhmatdyt.”

In August, in cooperation with Atlas and the UNITED24 platform, a fundraising campaign was launched that accumulated 100 million hryvnias for the purchase of ground and aerial drones.

In November 2025, on the occasion of monobank’s anniversary, 50 million hryvnias were raised and transferred to the Serhii Prytula Charitable Foundation for the procurement of drones.

In December, the annual “Christmas Tree” campaign within the monobank app raised 72 million hryvnias, which were allocated to support three military brigades: “Khartiia,” the 117th Separate Mechanized Brigade (117th OMBR), and the 53rd Separate Mechanized Brigade (53rd OMBR).

Throughout 2025, the bank acted as a partner of the charity festivals “Kurazh,” raising more than 1 million hryvnias, including a record 457,000 hryvnias during the “Kurazh. Season Opening” festival.

== Service outage ==
On 20 July 2023, at approximately 15:00, monobank experienced a major system outage that resulted in the mobile application becoming non-functional and all payments being temporarily halted. Users reported that most of the app’s features were not working. Some clients were able to log into the app but could not make transfers, top up mobile accounts, or use other essential functions.

According to project co-founder Oleg Gorokhovskyi, the outage was caused by an issue in the back-office system responsible for access to the client database. In addition to monobank users, clients of other Ukrainian financial intermediaries also encountered issues with blocked funds in EXANTE. The service was reported to be fully restored by 18:13 the same day.

== Cyberattacks ==
In August 2024, monobank experienced an unprecedented DDoS attack that lasted three days and consisted of more than 7.5 billion requests.

Bank co-founder Oleg Gorokhovskyi reported that specialists from Amazon Web Services (AWS) and Ukrainian special services joined in repelling the attack.

Earlier, in January 2024, monobank also repelled a large-scale DDoS attack of 580 million requests.

== Awards ==
monobank has received numerous national and international awards for its design, marketing, and digital banking services. Co-founder Oleg Gorokhovskyi was also recognized for their contributions. Monobank was twice included in CNBC’s Global Fintech 250 ranking in the Neobanks category.

In 2020, monobank won the Red Dot Design Award 2020 in the Finance App category. The same year, at the Effie Awards Ukraine 2020, the project received the Grand Prix and two gold awards.

At the FinAwards 2021, monobank was named “People’s Bank,” and also won awards for Best Mobile Application, Best Credit Card, Best Deposit, Best Loyalty Program, and Best Advertising Campaign. At the PaySpace Magazine Awards 2021, the bank received titles including Best Digital Bank, Best Bank Mobile Application, Best Card-to-Card Money Transfer Service, and Best Consumer Credit Product.

During the FinAwards 2022, monobank again won “People’s Bank,” along with Best Mobile Application, Best Premium Card, and Best Credit Card. At the PaySpace Magazine Awards 2022, monobank was named Best Digital Bank and received the award for Best Online Identification Service in a Bank.

== See also ==
- Revolut
- Wise
