= Dmytro Dubilet =

Ukrainian banker, businessman and politician

- Дмитро Дубілет
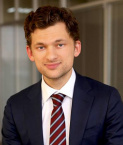

19th Minister of the Cabinet of Ministers
- In office 29 August 2019 – 4 March 2020
- Prime Minister: Oleksiy Honcharuk
- Preceded by: Oleksandr Saienko
- Succeeded by: Oleh Nemchinov

Personal details
- Born: 27 May 1985 (age 40) Dnipropetrovsk, Ukrainian SSR, Soviet Union (now Dnipro, Ukraine)
- Education: Taras Shevchenko National University of Kyiv; London Business School
- Occupation: banker businessman politician

Dmytro Oleksandrovych Dubilet (Ukrainian: Дмитро Олександрович Дубілет; born 27 May 1985) is a Ukrainian banker, businessman, one of the founders of Monobank, the first mobile bank in Ukraine, and the Checkbox fiscalization service, and politician. On 29 August 2019, he was appointed as the Minister of the Cabinet of Ministers. At the end of 2019, Dubilet left Monobank because he became a member of the government of Oleksiy Honcharuk, with whom he worked until March 2020. According to Dubilet's declaration for 2019, he sold his stake in Monobank for ₴29.9 million.

== Biography ==
Dmytro Dubilet was born and raised in Dnipro. He graduated from the Institute of International Relations at the Taras Shevchenko National University of Kyiv (2006). He also studied at the London Business School (2011).

Since 2009, he has worked in various positions, mostly in the banking industry.

From 2012 to 2016, Dubilet served as CIO for PrivatBank.

Since 2015, Dubilet started developing the iGov portal, which aims to fight corruption and provide government basic services online.

In 2017, he co-founded Fintech Band, which launched mobile-only Monobank on the legal basis of Universal bank.

He was formerly an advisor to the Head of the Security Service of Ukraine Ivan Bakanov.

In July 2020, Dmytro Dubilet announced the launch of Checkbox — a service of software cash registers for Ukrainian businesses of any scale. The project was developed alongside Dubilet by Andriy Sukhov, Yulia Guseva, and Vadym Khodak.

== See also ==
- Honcharuk Government
