= Oleg Gorokhovskyi =

Ukrainian businessman

- Олег Гороховський
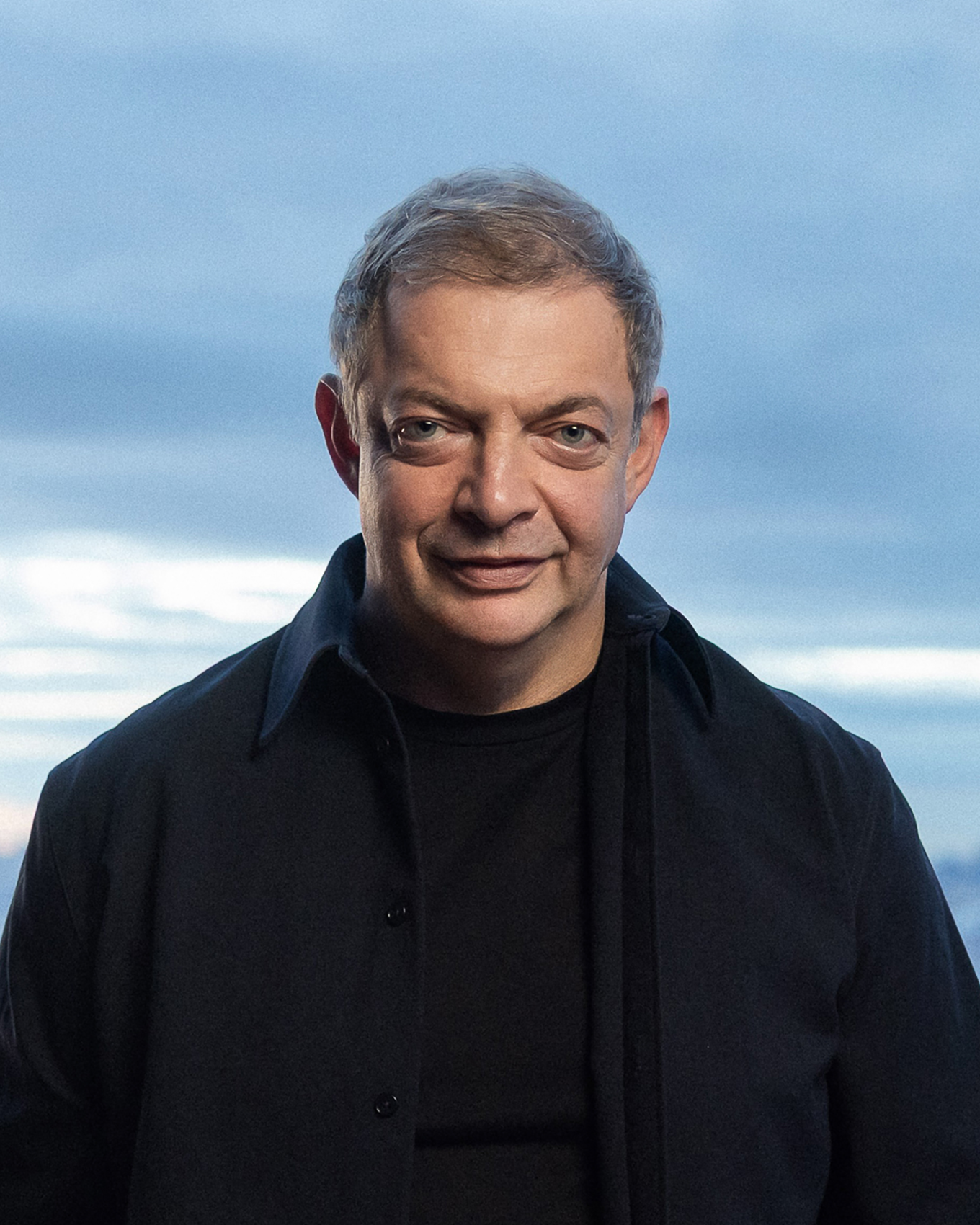
- Gorokhovskyi in 2025
- Born: 19 September 1974 (age 51); Dnipropetrovsk, Ukrainian SSR, Soviet Union
- Education: National Metallurgical Academy of Ukraine
- Occupations: Banker; entrepreneur
- Years active: 1995–present
- Known for: Co-founder of monobank and Fintech-IT Group
- Spouse: Tamara Kryuchkova
- Children: 3

Oleg Volodymyrovych Gorokhovskyi (Ukrainian: Олег Володимирович Гороховський, romanized: Oleh Volodymyrovych Horokhovskyi; born 19 September 1974) is a Ukrainian businessman, banker, and co-founder of Fintech-IT Group and projects, such as monobank, Ukraine's first mobile-only neobank.

In October 2025, his company became Ukraine's first fintech "unicorn" after reaching a valuation of $1 billion.

== Early life and education ==
Gorokhovskyi was born in Dnipropetrovsk (now Dnipro), modern-day Ukraine. He graduated with honors from School No. 96 and later earned a degree in "Enterprise Economics" from the National Metallurgical Academy of Ukraine.

== Career ==
Gorokhovskyi began his career as an intern at PrivatBank during his final year of university. Over 21 years, he rose through the ranks, becoming the head of the VIP banking division at 28. By age 37, he was appointed First Deputy Chairman of the Board. During his tenure, PrivatBank grew into the largest financial institution in Ukraine, serving over 25 million customers. He resigned in December 2016 following the bank's nationalization by the Ukrainian government.

In 2017, Gorokhovskyi co-founded Fintech Band (later transformed into the Fintech-IT Group holding). The company launched monobank in partnership with Universal Bank, introducing a "branchless" banking model.

In January 2023, Gorokhovskyi and his partners invested £14 million into Koto (later rebranded as The Credit Thing), their British fintech venture focused on providing credit services in the United Kingdom market.

In October 2025, the holding company Fintech-IT Group (which includes Fintech Band and other IT assets) secured a landmark investment from the Ukraine-Moldova American Enterprise Fund (UMAEF) and a consortium of private U.S. investors. The deal valued the company at $1 billion, making Fintech-IT Group the first Ukrainian fintech startup to reach unicorn status.

=== Public Service ===
Since 2021, Gorokhovskyi has served as a consultant to the Ministry of Digital Transformation in developing the Diia mobile application. On June 27, 2025, he was appointed to the Council for Support of Entrepreneurship under the President of Ukraine, an advisory body focused on protecting business interests during the country's post-war recovery.

== Philanthropy ==
During the full-scale Russian invasion of Ukraine, Gorokhovskyi used the monobank platform to facilitate massive crowdfunding efforts for the Ukrainian Armed Forces.

He personally contributed to the purchase of 20 Warmate kamikaze drones and supports charities such as Tabletochka and Zhyttieliub.

In 2025, he and his wife, Tamara, funded the Ukrainian publication of Natan Sharansky's memoir, Fear No Evil.

== Awards and recognition ==
In 2020 and 2023, Oleg Gorokhovskyi was twice named "Banker of the Year" by the FinAwards. In 2023, Forbes Ukraine recognized him as the "Entrepreneur of the Year".

In 2024, he was included in the "People of the Decade (2014–2024)" list by NV Magazine.

In 2025, Oleg Gorokhovskyi, together with Mykhailo Rogalskyi, was included in the UP100 list in the 'Business' category.

In August 2026, Focus magazine included Oleg Gorokhovsky in its rating of top Ukrainian executives in the Finance category.
