= Oleksandr Saienko =

Ukrainian politician

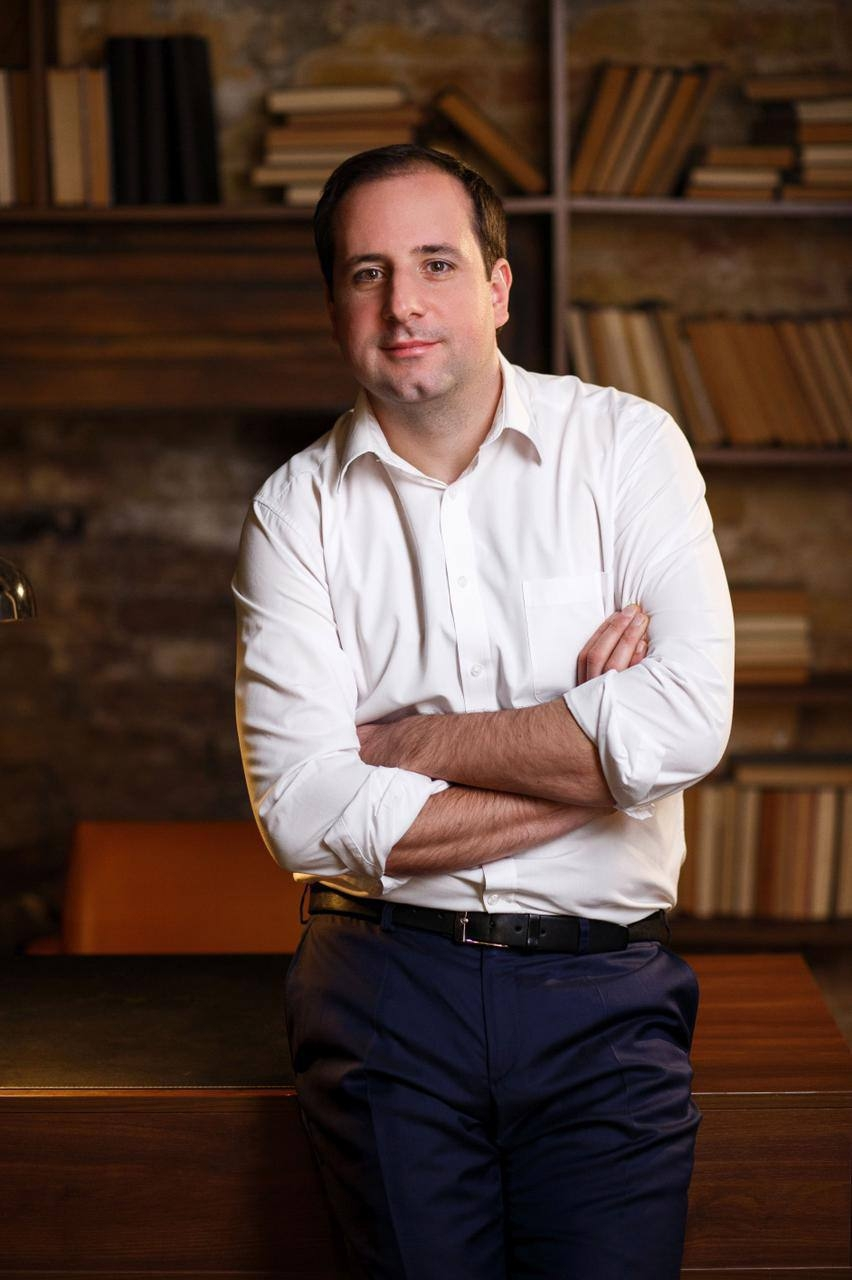

18th Minister of the Cabinet of Ministers
- In office 14 April 2016 – 29 August 2019
- Prime Minister: Volodymyr Groysman
- Succeeded by: Dmytro Dubilet

Personal details
- Born: 29 February 1984 (age 42) Kyiv, Ukrainian SSR

Oleksandr Saienko (Ukrainian: Олександр Саєнко, sometimes transliterated as Oleksandr Sayenko; born 29 February 1984) is Ukrainian politician who served as Minister of the Cabinet of Ministers from 14 April 2016 to 29 August 2019. Within the Volodymyr Hroisman's Government, he was responsible for the implementation of priority reforms and coordination of work of the Secretariat of the Cabinet of Ministers of Ukraine.

He heads the Reforms Delivery Office under the prime minister of Ukraine. On 26 April 2017, the Cabinet of Ministers appointed Oleksandr Saienko as a chairman of the Coordination Council for Public Administration Reform. Honorary president of the National Sambo Federation of Ukraine (elected on 6 September, 2017th at the extraordinary NFSU conference).

Head of the working group on privatization, according to the Government resolution dated 24 June 2015, No. 525 from 14 February 2018.

Is a member of the nominating committee for the selection of top-managers of SOEs of high- importance to the economy of Ukraine.

In 2014, he works as an advisor to the vice prime minister – Minister of Regional Development, Construction, Housing and Utilities of Ukraine. In 2015, he heads the secretariat of the chairman of the Verkhovna Rada of Ukraine (Parliament of Ukraine).

== Education ==
Oleksandr Saienko graduated from the Kyiv Professional and Pedagogical College named after Anton Makarenko, later on – from the National Academy of State Tax Service of Ukraine (2006) with a specialization in "Jurisprudence."

From 2006 until 2009 he is doctoral candidate at the Legislation Institute of the Verkhovna Rada of Ukraine.

In 2011, he completed his studies at the Center for Creative Leadership (USA) and at the Canada School of Public Service.

== Professional career ==
Saienko began his working career in 2003 in the position of lead specialist on Labor and Social Protection Department of the Shevchenko County State Administration in the city of Kyiv. In June 2004, he moved to the Ministry of Economy and European Integration to work in the position of lead specialist at the Office of Legal Support for the Budget Policy.

During 2005, he served at the Center for Support of Civil Service Institutional Development of the Main Department of the Civil Service of Ukraine, on the position of senior consultant at the Department for Legal Support and Rule-Making, and head of International Cooperation Department.

In 2005–2006, he participated in a functional survey of ministries, worked on the Law of Ukraine "On State Service," participated in the assessment of the public administration system under the Sigma Program and in the implementation of Institution Building Instruments Twinning, TAIEX.

From February to April 2006, he worked in the position of senior tax inspector at the Organization and Administrative Management Department of the State Tax Service in Kyiv Oblast. From April to September 2006, he worked in the position of head of department for European Integration and International Cooperation at the Department for Strategic Management and Efficiency of Public Service of the Main Department of Civil Service of Ukraine. In October 2006, he was transferred to the position of head of department for International Cooperation of the Center for Support of Civil Service Institutional Development of the Main Department of Civil Service of Ukraine. Later on he was the first deputy director of the Center for Support of Civil Service Institutional Development and since 2009 occupied the position of director of the School of Senior Civil Service of Ukraine (city of Kyiv). In December 2011, he started working for the Ukraine Economic Reform Fund (city of Kyiv) in the position of economic consultant.

From March 2014, Saienko worked as a senior advisor to the vice prime minister – Minister of Regional Development, Construction, Housing and Utilities of Ukraine. From January to March 2015, he worked as assistant consultant to Member of Ukrainian Parliament V. B. Hroisman.

In March 2015, he became head of the secretariat of the chairman of the Verkhovna Rada of Ukraine.

He worked on the concept of public administration reform and the administrative services reform. He was one of the drafters of the Law of Ukraine "On Administrative Services" that implements the best international experience of granting the powers of providing services to local governments.

The Leadership Program for top public officials has been implemented based on the School of Senior Civil Service of Ukraine with the support from Canada School of Public Administration.

On 14 April 2016, he was appointed Minister of the Cabinet of Ministers of Ukraine.

== Activities in the position of Minister of the Cabinet of Ministers of Ukraine ==
In the position of Minister of the Cabinet of Ministers of Ukraine, Oleksandr Saienko was responsible for the implementation of multi-sector reforms and liaisons among ministries. The activities of a Minister of the Cabinet of Ministers of Ukraine are governed by Regulation of the Cabinet of Ministers of Ukraine No. 394 of 28 June 2016.

"A Minister of the Cabinet of Ministers shall be responsible for horizontal communications and coordinate work of ministries in different areas. For example, there are reforms requiring the participation of several ministries and departments – therefore, horizontal communications are required. Examples may be the administrative reform and civil service reform. "It is about the effective interaction among ministries and the organization of the meetings of the government," – he noted in an interview to the Internet-periodical "Livyi Bereh".

One of the main areas of his responsibility is the public administration reform. It started May 2016 with the entry into effect by the Law of Ukraine "On State Service." Then it has been designated as one of the priority Government reforms.

In June 2016, The Government approved the Public Administration Reform Strategy for 2016 – 2020 with a clear action plan for its implementation. In December, at the meeting of the Association Committee, the Financial Agreement with the EU was signed in support of the reform.

Public Administration Reform includes the following components: • Government capacity building to carry out strategic planning. A Strategic Planning Department was established within the Secretariat of the Cabinet of Ministers of Ukraine that, jointly with the Office, was involved in the preparation of the Strategic Plan of Priority Actions for the Government for the period up to 2020. • Delineation of political and administrative functions in ministries and the development of the state secretaries' institute. In 2016, the state secretaries' institute was established, said secretaries to assume administrative functions, which would allow the Ministers to focus on the political component of their work. At the same time, this innovation would ensure the sustainability of the functioning of ministries. State secretaries of ministries are selected in an open competition for a 5-year tenure. • Introduction of a policy analysis cycle as a mandatory procedure for the drafting of all government resolutions. • Implementation of electronic government. In August 2016, the Cabinet of Ministries fully switched to electronic document flow with central executive authorities. • Strengthening the professional and institutional capacity of all ministries and of the Secretariat of the Cabinet of Ministers of Ukraine.

In November 2016, the Cabinet of Ministers of Ukraine approved the concept of introducing the positions of reform specialists.

Reform specialists shall mean government officials who are appointed based on the results of an open competition pursuant to the Law of Ukraine "On State Service." They shall be responsible for the implementation of key reforms and will enjoy a special compensation package. The list of positions of reform specialists shall be compiled by the ministers and approved by the government. Aside from their official salaries and public official benefits envisaged by law, the reform specialists will receive additional incentive payments. Funding will be allocated from the State Budget. The State Budget funds spent for the incentive payments will be compensated at the cost of the EU financial support.

At the meeting of the Government of 26 April 2016, Oleksandr Saienko presented his concept of the reform of ministries.

In the course of this reform, it is envisaged to select nine pilot ministries and the Secretariat of the Cabinet of Ministers of Ukraine that will serve as a model for the later reform of all other ministries. The reform of the ministries includes the stage of analyzing the functions of ministries that will be implemented by working groups with the participation of EU experts, the engagement of professionals (1000 new positions of reforms specialists have been announced) and the introduction of an electronic interaction system (EIS).

On 26 April 2017, the Government approved the concept of ministries reform proposed by O. Saienko.

Saienko stayed on has minister until on 29 August 2019 the Honcharuk government was installed.

== 2019 parliamentary election ==
Saienko took part in the July 2019 Ukrainian parliamentary election with the party Ukrainian Strategy. But this party did not manage to win any parliamentary seats.

== Personal life ==
Oleksandr Saienko is married and has a daughter and two sons.

Hobbies - sambo, chess.
