= Oleh Nemchinov =

Ukrainian civil servant and politician

- Олег Немчінов
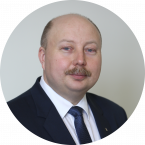

20th Minister of the Cabinet of Ministers
- In office 4 March 2020 – 17 July 2025
- President: Volodymyr Zelenskyy
- Prime Minister: Denys Shmyhal
- Preceded by: Dmytro Dubilet

Personal details
- Born: 1 May 1977 (age 48) Lviv, Ukrainian SSR, Soviet Union (now Ukraine)
- Party: Ukrainian People's Party
- Education: University of Lviv; Ternopil National Economic University
- Occupation: civil servant politician

Oleh Mykolayovych Nemchinov (Ukrainian: Олег Миколайович Немчінов; born 1 May 1977) is a Ukrainian civil servant and politician. On 4 March 2020, he was appointed as the Minister of the Cabinet of Ministers.

== Biography ==
Nemchinov studied at the University of Lviv (1999). He graduated from the Ternopil National Economic University (2003).

Candidate of Sciences in Public Administration.

From 1999 to 2002, he worked at the Lviv City Council. From 2009 to 2010, he also worked in the Lviv Regional State Administration. It is there where he met and worked with future Prime Minister of Ukraine Denys Shmyhal.

From 2003 to 2006, he was an assistant to a People's Deputy of Ukraine.

From 2017 to 2020, Nemchinov served as Secretary of State for the Ministry of Youth and Sports.

On 4 March 2020 Nemchinov was appointed as the Minister of the Cabinet of Ministers in the Shmyhal Government led by Prime Minister Denys Shmyhal.

== See also ==
- Shmyhal Government
