= Sternenko Community Foundation =

Ukrainian charitable organisation

- Благодійний фонд «Спільнота Стерненка»
- Founded: 15 January 2025
- Founder: Serhii Sternenko
- Type: Charitable organization
- Purpose: Unmanned aerial vehicle technology, military aid
- Location: Kyiv, Ukraine
- Region served: Ukraine
- Key people: Oleksandr Skarlat (Executive Director)
- Website: sternenkofund.org

The Sternenko Community Foundation (Ukrainian: Благодійний фонд «Спільнота Стерненка») is a Ukrainian charitable organisation that specialises in supplying the Armed Forces of Ukraine with FPV drones and electronic warfare equipment. According to Business Insider, the organisation is part of a broader civilian movement that has significantly augmented Ukraine's military capabilities through high-tech volunteer procurement.

== History ==
The organisation originated as a volunteer initiative led by civic activist Serhii Sternenko following the Russian invasion of Ukraine in 2022. It was formally registered as a charitable foundation in January 2025.

In September 2025, the foundation signed a memorandum with the Ukrainian Ministry of Defence to consolidate defenсe efforts and expand strategic collaboration with the government as well as international organisations. On 22 January 2026, founder Serhii Sternenko was appointed as an adviser to the Minister of Defence, specialising in the enhancement of drone combat strategies.

== Activities ==
The foundation's primary focus is the procurement of customised FPV drones, including strike drones and interceptors designed to counter Shahed-type loitering munitions.

As of late 2025, the foundation reported having raised over UAH 3.1 billion (approximately $75 million) and delivered more than 118,000 FPV drones to the Ukrainian military. The organisation states that 95.5% of donations go directly toward the purchase and delivery of FPV drones and other military aid to the Armed Forces of Ukraine. The foundation publishes daily reports with photos and videos confirming deliveries to military units.

=== Key projects ===
- Rusoriz, procurement of strike FPV drones.
- Sky Rusoriz (also known as Nebesnyi Rusoriz), development and delivery of FPV interceptor drones to protect Ukrainian skies from Russian reconnaissance and strike UAVs.
- Shahedoriz, a specialised program for developing and supplying FPV interceptor drones to counter Shahed-type and Gerbera loitering munitions. The project has resulted over 2,200 enemy drones being destroyed, with reported enemy losses exceeding $92 million.
- ReDrone, a research and development program for technical drone modifications based on feedback from active-duty operators.
- In March 2026, within the interceptor drone program, the foundation funded the development of the HORNET VISION Ctrl remote control system for Sting interceptors produced by Wild Hornets. This innovation allows remote drone operation from significant distances and has been successfully tested in several Ukrainian air defence units.

== Partners ==
The foundation collaborates with state institutions and private companies, including the Ministry of Defence (strategic memorandum), Monobank (joint fundraising campaigns), and the developer RIEL.

In 2025, the foundation received UAH 44 million from the Specialized Anti-Corruption Prosecutor's Office (SAPO) from plea agreements for the purchase of FPV drones.
