= Aleksandr Sayenko =

Russian footballer

Personal information
- Full name: Aleksandr Aleksandrovich Sayenko
- Date of birth: 5 March 1978 (age 48)
- Place of birth: Potsdam, East Germany
- Height: 1.72 m (5 ft 7 1/2 in)
- Position: Midfielder

Youth career
- SDYuSShOR-5 Krasnodar

Senior career*
Years	Team	Apps	(Gls)
1996	FC Kolos Krasnodar	14	(0)
1996–1998	FC Rostselmash Rostov-on-Don	2	(0)
1996–1998	→ FC Rostselmash-2 Rostov-on-Don (loans)	54	(4)
1999–2001	FC Kuban Krasnodar	48	(10)
2003	FC Spartak Anapa	9	(0)
- * Club domestic league appearances and goals

Aleksandr Aleksandrovich Sayenko (Russian: Александр Александрович Саенко; born 5 March 1978) is a former Russian football player.
