= Fintech-IT Group =

Ukrainian technology holding company

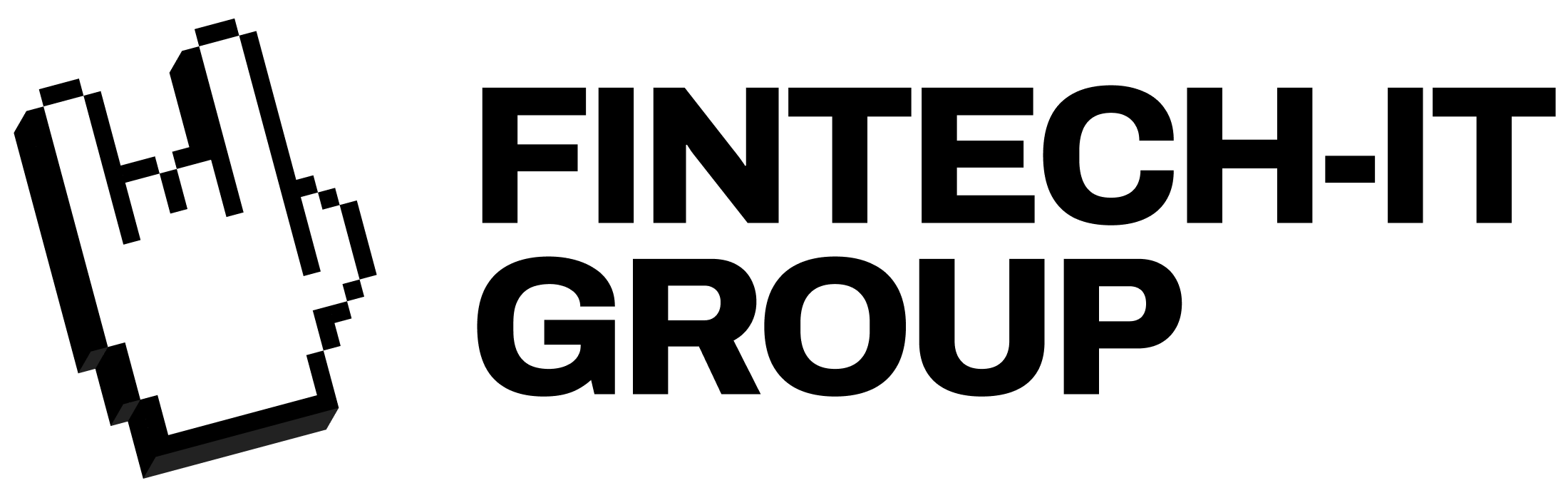
- Type: Private (Holding)
- Industry: Fintech, IT, E-commerce
- Founded: March 2017; 9 years ago
- Founders: Oleg Gorokhovskyi, Mykhailo Rogalskyi
- Headquarters: Ukraine
- Area served: Ukraine
- Key people: Oleg Gorokhovskyi, Mykhailo Rogalskyi
- Products: monobank, monobusiness, monomarket, monobazaar, Expirenza, Base by mono, Loyalty.ai
- Number of employees: Over 800 (February 2026)
- Subsidiaries: Fintech Band, ACDC Processing, Shake to Pay / Expirenza, Kilobyte, MOSST

Fintech-IT Group is a Ukrainian technology holding company and the developer of the mono product ecosystem. The group specializes in creating integrated software products for digital banking, e-commerce, and the HoReCa. In October 2025, the company became Ukraine's first fintech "unicorn," achieving a valuation of over $1 billion following an international investment round.

== History ==
The holding was established in March 2017 by entrepreneurs Oleg Gorokhovskyi and Mykhailo Rogalskyi. The structure was formed through the consolidation of several technology companies that provided the development and operation of the mono ecosystem services. In 2020, the monobank mobile application received the international Red Dot Award in the Brands & Communication Design category.

Between 2024 and 2025, the group completed its asset consolidation after receiving the necessary approvals from the Antimonopoly Committee of Ukraine. In October 2025, the Ukraine-Moldova American Enterprise Fund (UMAEF), along with a group of American investors, invested in the holding, which solidified the company's valuation at over $1 billion.

== Structure ==
Fintech-IT Group includes several specialized divisions:

- Fintech Band – Developer of the initial version of the monobank application.
- ACDC Processing – A technological payment service operator certified under PCI DSS standards.
- Shake to Pay / Expirenza – Platforms for digitizing the restaurant business (QR payments, digital menus, reservations).
- Kilobyte – Developer of monobank 2.0, which integrates retail and business banking solutions.
- MOSST – A technological payment service operator acquired in 2024 from the Swiss group Compagnie Bancaire Helvétique.
