= Serhii Sternenko =

Ukrainian activist, adviser, lawyer, and YouTuber

- Сергій Стерненко
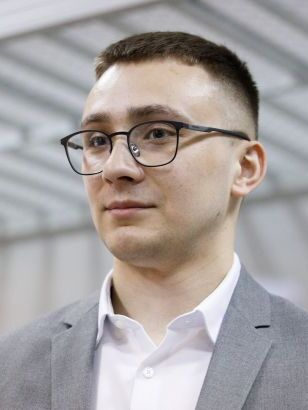
- Sternenko in Kyiv, 2020
- Born: 20 March 1995 (age 31); Sadove, Odesa Oblast, Ukraine
- Education: Taras Shevchenko National University of Kyiv (2022); Odesa University (2019)
- Occupations: Social activist; lawyer; YouTuber; adviser

YouTube information
- Channel: STERNENKO
- Years active: 2013–present
- Subscribers: 2.2 million
- Views: 1.5 billion
- Last updated: November 2026

Serhii Viacheslavovych Sternenko (Ukrainian: Сергій Вʼячеславович Стерненко; born 20 March 1995) is a Ukrainian activist, adviser, lawyer, and YouTuber. As of 2026, his YouTube channel has over 2.2 million subscribers. He is the head of the non-government organization Nebayduzhi (Ukrainian: Небайдужі), one of the founders of the People's Lustration, and a former board member and head of the Odesa regional branch of Right Sector, a coalition of right-wing groups that includes ultranationalist and far-right elements. He was an active participant in the Revolution of Dignity, including the 2014 Odesa clashes.

Sternenko was the target of four assassination attempts. In 2018, he became visible in the media after the third attempt. It is believed that the "manhunt" was organized by supporters of pro-Russian groups and their sympathizers. During the incident, one of the two attackers died and the second fled abroad. As a result, Sternenko has been accused of exceeding the limits of self-defence. The police formally charged him with premeditated murder and possession of weapons without permit. However, Andrii Radionov, the senior prosecutor in the case, refused to sign the charges, claiming that the case and the evidence in the case are biased and do not comply with the legislation of Ukraine.

The case against Sternenko received considerable media attention and prompted hundreds of activists to gather near the court building in support of Sternenko. Hundreds of security officers were called upon to restrain the people.

== Early life and Euromaidan ==
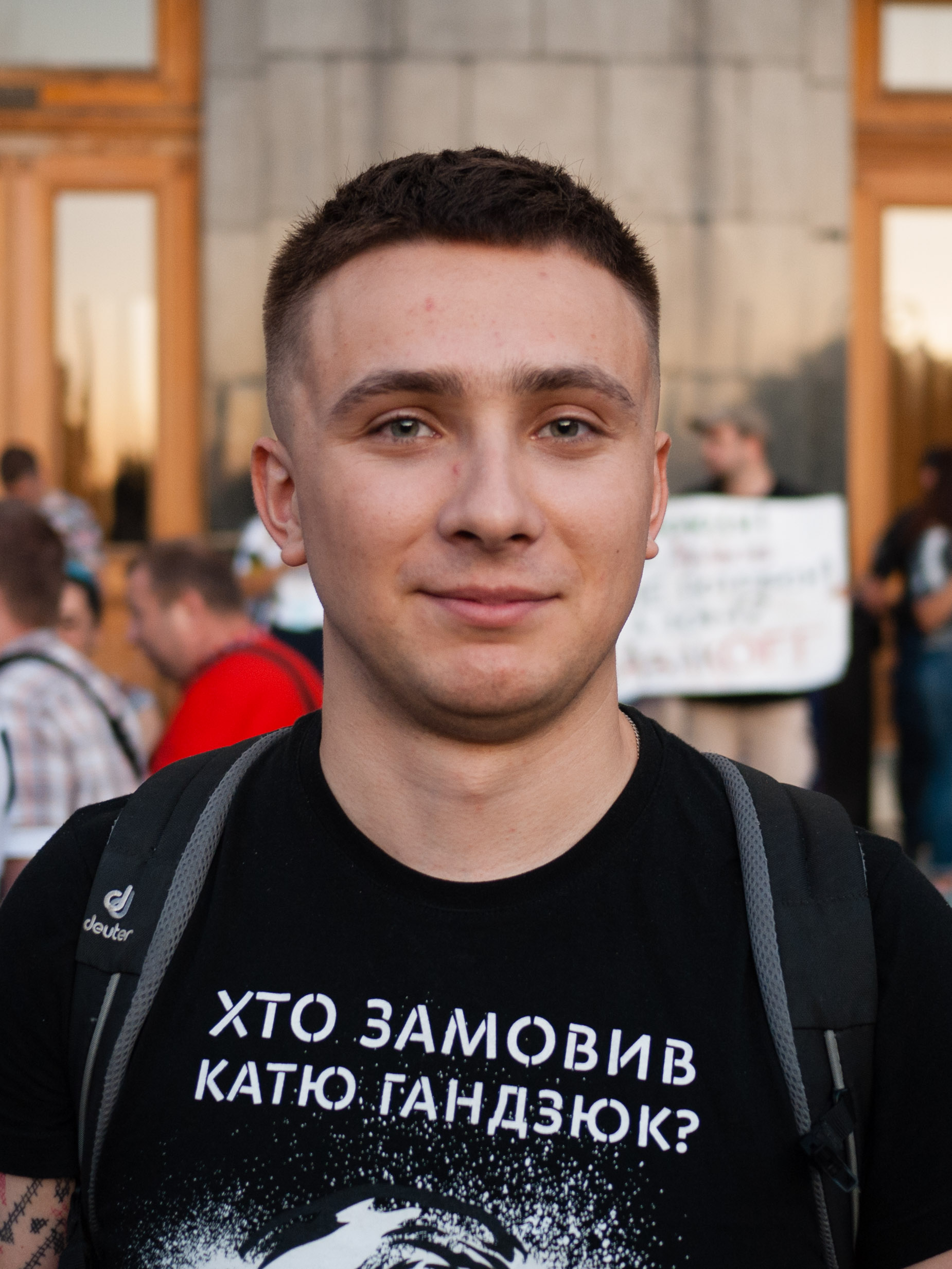
His shirt reads «Who ordered to murder Katia Handziuk?», 2019. Kyiv

Sternenko is a native of the village of Sadove, located on the banks of Dniester Estuary near Bilhorod-Dnistrovskyi. Serhii's father is a former border guard, his mother is a teacher. Prior to 2014, he was a social media pr manager and tried to start a career as a hip hop artist.

In June 2016, he graduated from the Odesa College of economics, law, hotel and restaurant business majoring in "Jurisprudence", as a junior specialist in law. He then started working as a legal consultant at the company "Оскар Т". In 2019, he graduated from the Odesa Mechnykov National University, majoring in "Jurisprudence". In 2022, he graduated from the master's degree at the Institute of International Relations of Taras Shevchenko National University of Kyiv, majoring in International Law. He also practices judo. He lived in Odesa, but after a series of attempts on his life, he moved to Kyiv.

Sternenko was an active participant in the 2014 Ukrainian revolution and is one of the founders of the Lustration in Ukraine. He is also a civil activist and lawyer, and served as the head of the non-government organization Nebayduzhi and as a former board member and head of the Odesa regional branch of the Right Sector. His participation in the Euromaidan movement began in January 2014 in Odesa. Later, he traveled to Kyiv, where he was present on Hrushevsky Street during the riots and police shootings on February 20, 2014. After the establishment of "Right Sector" in Odesa on February 5, 2014, on March 22 of the same year, he was appointed to head the regional branch of the organization. During the 2014 Odesa clashes, he was said to have personally saved two people from the burning House of Trade Unions building. He was also one of the organizers of the so-called "trash lustration". On September 30, 2014, he participated, along with other activists of the Right Sector, Automaidan, Euromaidan, and Self-Defense, in the "trash lustration" of Nestor Shufrych, who came to Odesa for a meeting of the "Opposition Bloc" party. Nestor Shufrych tried to run away, which caused a scuffle, as a result of which the deputy received injuries.

Sternenko took part in many other activities in Odesa during this time, including: shutting off spice drug trafficking circles in Odesa by Right Sector, the disruption of the concerts of Ani Lorak and Svetlana Loboda in Odesa in 2014, the picketing of the Russian consulate, the blockade of the occupied Crimea in the fall of 2015, the criminal prosecution of Igor Bychkov (caught for bribing the head doctor of the Rozdilnya Central District Hospital, who was sentenced to five years), assisting in the conviction of Valentin Dubovenko (involved in corruption schemes and abuse of official position), and other measures.

On September 13, 2015, in Odesa, Sternenko was one of the organizers of the "March in Support of Political Prisoners" for Andriy Medvedko and Denys Polischuk, who were accused of murdering pro-Russian commentator Oles Buzina.

== After Euromaidan ==
In 2015, Sternenko sharply criticized Ukrainian President Petro Poroshenko, saying in particular: "Poroshenko's regime put even more people behind bars than Viktor Yanukovych's bandit regime did at the time".

On November 15, 2016, he appealed to the court with a lawsuit against a professor of the Faculty of History of Odesa National University, Olena Radzikhovska. The Suvorovsky District Court of Odesa partially satisfied the lawsuit and ordered the defendant to pay the amount specified in the lawsuit — 1 hryvnia, as compensation for moral damage to the defendant.

On November 17, 2017, he was one of the organizers of the disruption of the performance of the Russian actor Konstantin Raikin. Protesters strongly criticized Raikin for his speeches in support of Russia's occupation of Crimea.

On November 18, 2017, he was one of the participants in large scale protests that took place in Odesa against the development of part of the territory of the Odesa city garden — the Summer Theater (Odesa), where a new shopping centre was planned to be built. Following violent confrontations between protesters and police, Sternenko turned himself in to the police when he found out that he was suspected of organizing mass riots during the rally against the building. On November 24, the Odesa Primorskyi District Court chose a preventive measure for the activist in the form of detention for a period of 60 days with the alternative of posting bail in the amount of UAH 600,000. The head of the Odesa Regional State Administration, Maksym Stepanov, paid the amount of the bond but the appellate court canceled the bond, passing a decision on personal commitment.

He was among the organizers of the protest action "Avakov is the devil", which took place on August 28, 2019, in Kyiv near the Office of the President of Ukraine. The participants of the protest requested to President Volodymyr Zelenskyy that Arsen Avakov should not be in the new government. Avakov was accused by the protesters of being an ineffective minister and of failing to reform the Ministry of Internal Affairs.

On November 2, 2019, Serhiy Sternenko registered a petition to the President of Ukraine, which refers to the introduction of a ban for citizens of the Russian Federation on visiting the territory of Ukraine or the introduction of a visa regime. On November 11, the petition gathered more than 25,000 signatures.

== Assassination attempts ==
On 9 October 2019, the General Prosecutor's Office of Ukraine sent a criminal case involving attacks on civil activist Serhii Sternenko in Odesa to the Main Investigation Directorate of the SBU to check the information about the possible involvement of local authorities and police of the Odesa city. Earlier in 2018, the Odesa police launched criminal proceedings under Part 1, Article 15, Part 1, Article 115 (attempted murder) of the Criminal Code of Ukraine due to an assassination attempt on activist Serhii Sternenko. The attack on Sternenko took place right next to his place of residence in Odesa during night time hours. The Sternenko's assailants were not residents of Odesa. During 2018 there were at least three attacks on Sternenko, one of which led to the death of one of the attackers. Consequently, one of the former attackers accused Sternenko of planned assassination against them. Isaikul said Sternenko attacked him and Ivan Kuznetsov while holding hands with his girlfriend and carrying groceries. The attack on Sternenko was one of several repressions against activists and journalists such as Kateryna Handziuk in 2018 throughout South Ukraine and Odesa in particular. Oleh Tatarov, a member of the Ministry of Internal Affairs during the Yanukovych government and now working as a presidential aide to Zelenskyy, had also requested that the Security Service of Ukraine investigate Sternenko for "intentional murder" and attempted murder over the case.

A week after her appointment on 25 March 2020, the new Prosecutor General of Ukraine Iryna Venediktova held a formal meeting with the Minister of Internal Affairs Arsen Avakov to discuss the case about attack on Sternenko, but called it as the notorious case about murder of Ivan Kuznetsov. At the time of that meeting the case was under investigation in the Security Service of Ukraine.

The senior prosecutor of the case, Andrii Radionov, refused to sign the suspicion in the court case involving the attack on Sternenko. He claimed that the case and the evidence in the case were biased and did not comply with the legislation of Ukraine. The case became resonant, and thus, on 12 June 2020, hundreds of activists gathered near the court walls in defense of Sternenko, while hundreds of security officers were called up on to restrain the people.

On 1 May 2025, Sternenko announced that he had been shot and injured in an assassination attempt which he blamed on Russia and was thwarted by the Security Service of Ukraine, which arrested a suspect.

== Criminal case ==
In 2015, Sternenko's house in Odesa was searched in relation to the abduction of Serhii Shcherbych, a deputy of the Lyman Raion Council, previously of the pro-Russian Rodina party. On 23 February 2021, a court in Odesa found Sternenko guilty of kidnapping, robbery, and illegal possession of a weapon in the Shcherbych case. Sternenko and his associate Ruslan Demchuk were sentenced to seven years and three months in prison, with half of their property to be confiscated. Both of the accused denied involvement in the abduction, with Sternenko stating that the verdict was politically motivated. That same evening, initially 500 but eventually 2,000 people protested near the Office of the President of Ukraine against Sternenko's imprisonment. Seventeen protesters were detained amid clashes with the police. On 31 May 2021, the Odesa Court of Appeals partially reversed the verdict against Sternenko and Demchuk. The kidnapping charge was the only upheld part of the sentence, but both were released from punishment due to the expiration of the term of prosecution. The Court of Appeals ruled that the prosecution had not provided sufficient evidence that Shcherbych was robbed.

== Activities during the Russian invasion of Ukraine ==
Immediately prior to the 2022 Russian invasion of Ukraine, he organized a peaceful protest on February 2, 2022, in order to close the pro-Russian TV channel NASH, which was owned by the pro-Russian politician Yevhen Murayev. Murayev later fled Ukraine during the early stages of the invasion.

On February 24, 2022, when Russia's full-scale invasion of Ukraine began, Sternenko joined the "Honor" unit, which is part of the Special Operations Forces.

Serhii Sternenko remained active on social media, pointing out multiple Russian war crimes during the war, and attacking supporters of Vladimir Putin's government. On October 15, 2022, Sternenko wrote that he would give $10,000 from his personal savings to whoever would take Igor Girkin prisoner. Later, the frontman of the band Antytila Taras Topolya, soldier and writer Valeriy Markus, the head of the Luhansk regional military administration Serhiy Haidai, the poet Yevhen Rybchynskyi, tennis player Sergiy Stakhovsky and others joined his initiative. On 4 December 2022, he posted images taken in Luhansk Oblast showing civilians executed by the Russian army, and called upon the world to see such images before suggesting Ukraine should accept any demands from Russia.

In January 2025, Sternenko founded the Sternenko Community Foundation, which became one of the largest non-governmental suppliers of FPV drones to the Armed Forces of Ukraine.

On 22 January 2026, he was appointed as adviser to the Ministry of Defense relating to drone warfare following Mykhailo Fedorov appointment. He left the position after Fedorov was dismissed as Minister of Defense on 15 July 2026.

== Video blog ==
Sternenko runs his own video blog on YouTube, where he talks about events in Ukraine, including the war. It won a Palianytsia Award for Man of the Year in Ukrainian YouTube from the editorial office of Toronto Television in 2020.

== Honors ==
- On October 4, 2016, Sternenko was awarded the Medal "For Sacrifice and Love for Ukraine" by the Ukrainian Orthodox Church of the Kyiv Patriarchate.
