= Kateryna Handziuk =

Ukrainian activist (1985–2018)

- Катерина Гандзюк
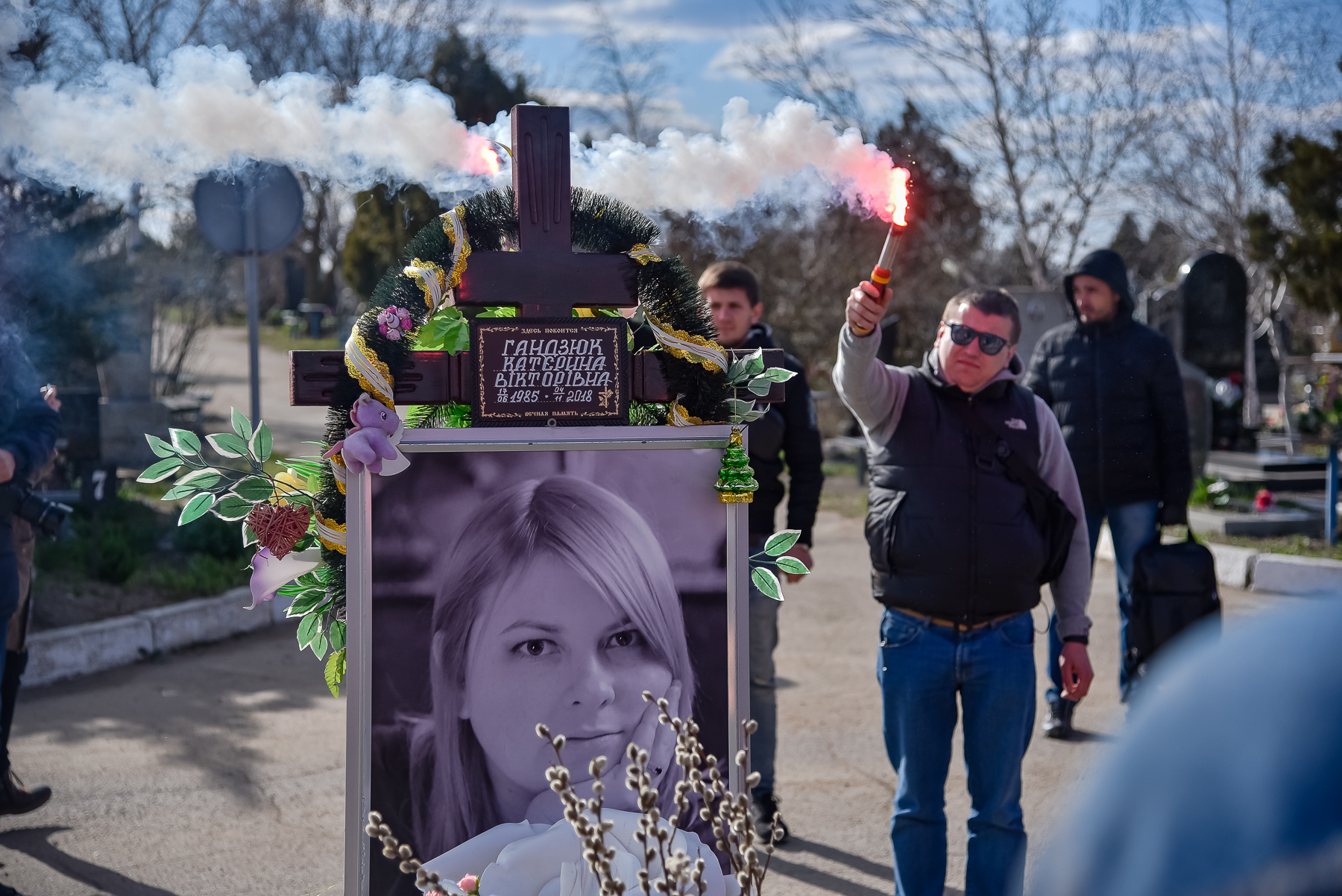
- Handziuk picture as seen during a March 2019 rally in Kherson in her honour
- Born: 17 June 1985; Kherson, Ukrainian SSR, USSR
- Died: 4 November 2018 (aged 33); Kyiv, Ukraine
- Cause of death: Injuries sustained from acid attack
- Occupations: Anti-corruption activist, campaigner, political advisor

Kateryna Viktorivna Handziuk (Ukrainian: Катерина Вікторівна Гандзюк; 17 June 1985 – 4 November 2018) was a Ukrainian civil rights and anti-corruption activist campaigner and political advisor, who exposed corruption in her hometown of Kherson. She was attacked with sulphuric acid on 31 July 2018, and died from her injuries on 4 November 2018.

== Education and career ==
Handziuk was born on 17 June 1985 in Kherson (then a city in the Ukrainian SSR of the USSR, now Ukraine).

Handziuk studied at the State University of Kherson between 2002 and 2006. She graduated in 2008 from the Kyiv National Economic University and 2016 from the National Academy of Public Administration in Kyiv. Handziuk joined the political party "Fatherland" in 2003, and she quickly became the leader of its local youth wing. In 2006, she was elected a deputy of the regional council of the Kherson Oblast and the Kherson City Council for the party Batkivshchyna, as well as advisor to the mayor of Kherson. She participated in the Orange Revolution.

In 2012, she volunteered for the United Nations Development Programme. She left the “Fatherland” party in 2015. During the Kherson 2015 local elections, Handziuk was an active volunteer who helped the acting mayor of Kherson, Volodymyr Mykolayenko, to win the elections. In November 2016, Handziuk become the acting manager of affairs at Kherson City Council’s executive committee.

Handziuk was a critic of the security authorities and especially condemned corruption in the regional department of Ministry of Internal Affairs. She had publicized the involvement of the police in several cases of corruption.

== Death ==
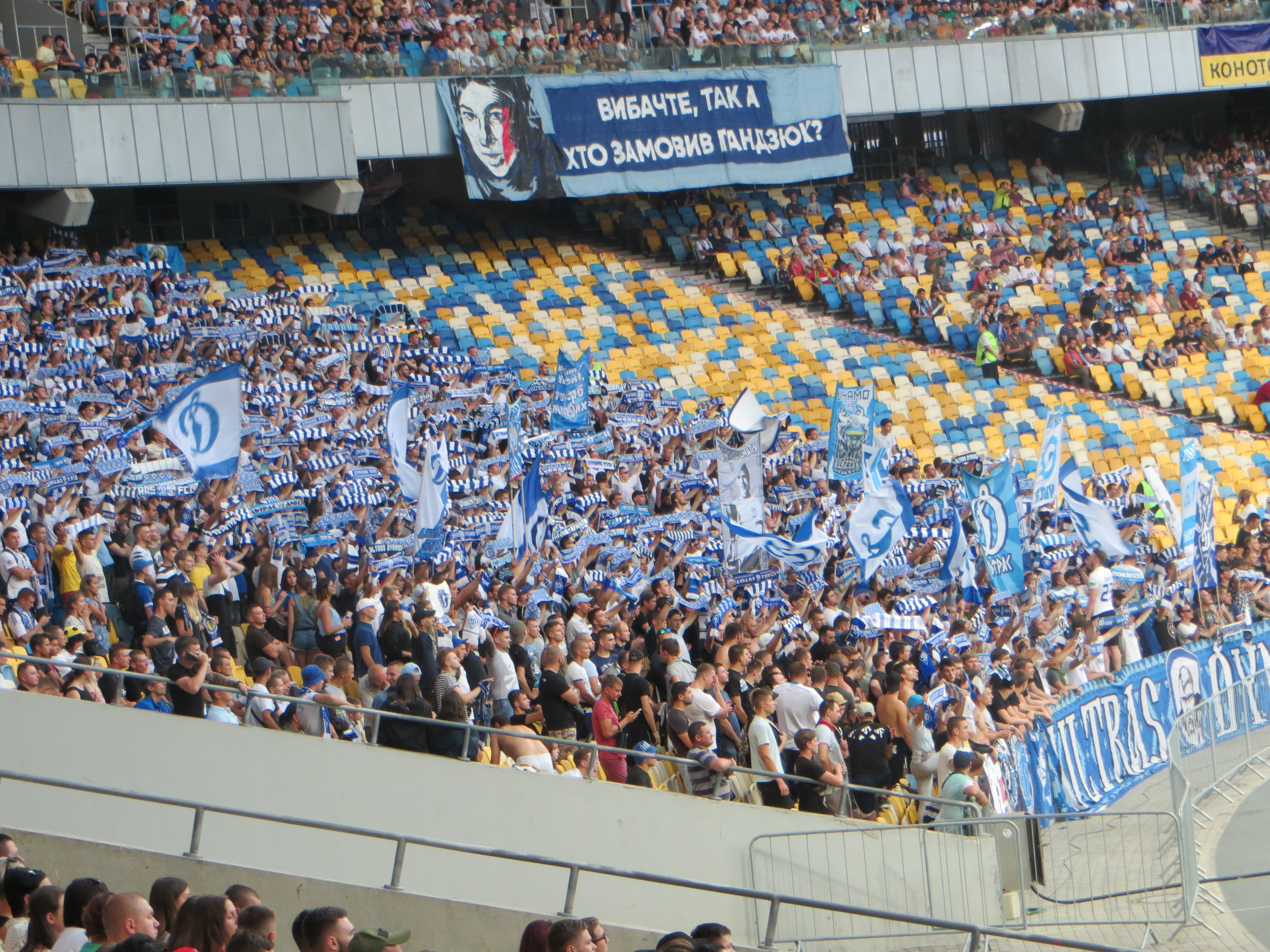
Banner asking to investigate Handziuk's attack during a football match of the FC Dynamo Kyiv in the 2018–19 UEFA Champions League in August 2018, which in Ukrainian reads, "Pardon, so who ordered [an attack on] Handziuk?"

A man threw sulfuric acid on her in front of her house on 31 July 2018 and fled. She suffered severe burns on more than 30% of her body. The Ukrainian authorities arrested five suspects. The European Commissioner for Enlargement and European Neighbourhood Policy Johannes Hahn wrote on Twitter: "Attacks on civil society activists are unacceptable. Those responsible for this insidious crime must be held accountable." Handziuk first received treatment at a local hospital but was transferred to a special medical institution in Kyiv soon afterward.

Handziuk died on 4 November 2018. The preliminary cause of death was a thrombosis. Ukrainian President Petro Poroshenko confirmed in the evening of the same day the death of Handziuk in a Kyiv hospital. He called on the police to do everything to clarify the case.

After the announcement of her death, there was a spontaneous mourning in the Ukrainian capital, in which hundreds of demonstrators moved to the Ministry of Interior and demanded the complete investigation of the murder.

Former United States Ambassador to Ukraine Marie Yovanovitch mentioned in testimony on 15 November 2019 before the United States House Permanent Select Committee on Intelligence impeachment inquiry against Donald Trump that she was honoring Kateryna Handziuk on 25 April, when she received a phone call from Washington, DC to leave Ukraine.

In June 2023 the former head of the council for Kherson Oblast, Vladyslav Manher, and his assistant, Oleksii Levin, were both found guilty of her murder. They were sentenced to 10 years in prison, and fined ₴15 million ($406,000) as victim compensation to her relatives.

== Legacy ==
In November 2022, as part of a derussification campaign, Kyiv's White Sea Street was renamed to Kateryna Handziuk Street.

== See also ==
- Serhii Sternenko
