= Secretariat of Cabinet of Ministers (Ukraine) =

Ukrainian government body

- Секретаріат Кабінету Міністрів України
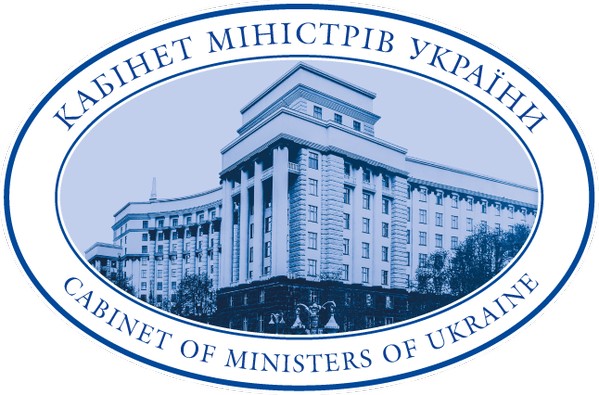

Agency overview
- Preceding agency: Ministry of Cabinet of Ministers
- Jurisdiction: Government of Ukraine
- Headquarters: Kyiv
- Employees: 1174
- Agency executive: Oleh Nemchinov, Minister
- Child agencies: Office of the Prime-Minister of Ukraine; Service of the First Vice-Prime Minister; Services of Vice-Prime Ministers; Service of the Minister of Cabinet of Ministers
- Website: Webpage at Government website

Secretariat of Cabinet of Ministers of Ukraine (Ukrainian: Секретаріат Кабінету Міністрів України, romanized: Sekretariat Kabinetu Ministriv Ukrayiny) is a constantly acting body that ensures activities of the Cabinet of Ministers of Ukraine.

== Overview ==
The main objective of the Secretariat is the organizational, expert-analytic, legal, informational, material-technical support for the Cabinet of Ministers of Ukraine, government committees, the Prime Minister of Ukraine, the First Vice-Prime Minister, Vice-Prime Ministers, the Minister of Cabinet of Ministers of Ukraine, and ministers without portfolio.

In its actions the Secretariat cooperates with the Presidential Administration of Ukraine, the Office of Verkhovna Rada, the Office of National Security and Defense Council of Ukraine, ministries and other central bodies of executive power, the Council of Ministers of Crimea and other Regional State Administrations (oblasts and cities), as well as other state institutions, bodies of a local self-government, public unions, enterprises, institutions and organizations.

== Composition ==
- Leadership
  - Minister of Cabinet of Ministers
  - First Deputy of the Minister
  - other deputies
- Patronage services
  - Office of the Prime Minister of Ukraine
  - Service of the First Vice-Prime Minister
  - Services of Vice-Prime Ministers
  - Service of the Minister of Cabinet of Ministers
- Structural divisions - bureau, departments, independent agencies and offices, and other sub-divisions
