= Valeriy Voshchevsky =

Ukrainian entrepreneur and politician (born 1956)

Valeriy Voshchevsky Валерій Вощевський
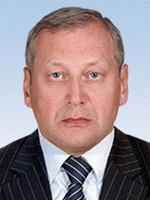

Vice Prime Minister (infrastructure, ecology, construction)
- In office 2 December 2014 – 17 September 2015
- Prime Minister: Arseniy Yatsenyuk
- Preceded by: Oleksandr Sych

Personal details
- Born: 12 June 1956 (age 70) Nizhyn Raion, Chernihiv Oblast, Ukraine
- Party: Radical Party of Oleh Lyashko (2014–present); Ukrainian Peasant Democratic Party (2000–2008)
- Education: Kyiv National Economic University; All-Russian Academy of Foreign Trade

Valeriy Mykolayovych Voshchevsky (Ukrainian: Валерій Миколайович Вощевський; born June 12, 1956) is a Ukrainian entrepreneur and politician who served as Vice Prime Minister of Ukraine from December 2014 until September 2015.

== Biography ==
Voshchevsky started his career as a Chernobyl disaster cleaner in 1991. He then had several jobs that lead to him heading in 1995 the corporation "Ahronaftoprodukt". In 2001 he became one of Agribusiness lobbyists in government, joining the Coordinating Council of the agricultural sector under the Kinakh Government. In 2002 he was appointed deputy head of the Department of internal policy of Presidential Administration Leonid Kuchma. In 2003 he held the position of First Deputy Minister of Economy and European Integration under Valery Khoroshkovsky. In 2000, Voschevsky became head of the Ukrainian Peasant Democratic Party; he held this post until 2008.

In the 2002 parliamentary elections, Voshchevsky was fifth on the election list of the electoral alliance Team of Winter Generation. The alliance won 2.0% of the popular vote and no seats. In the parliamentary elections of 2006, as a part of Lytvyn's People's Bloc", and in 2007, in the Peasants' Bloc "Agrarian Ukraine", he again failed to gain a parliamentary seat. From 2005 to 2006 and from 2008 to 2010 Voschevsky was chairman of the Board of JSC "SSC" Roads of Ukraine ". Voshchevsky headed the road construction and maintenance agency under former Ukrainian President Viktor Yanukovich in March and April 2010.

In the 2014 Ukrainian parliamentary election, he was elected to parliament at number 8 in the list of the Radical Party of Oleh Lyashko. In parliament he became deputy head of the faction. At the time he was chairman of the Supervisory Board of OJSC "Chernihiv confectionery factory" Strela ". Voshchevsky became Vice Prime Minister of Ukraine supervising national ecology, infrastructure and construction for Radical Party in the second Yatsenyuk Government on 2 December 2014.

Radical Party left the coalition on 1 September 2015 in protest over a vote in parliament involving a change to the Ukrainian Constitution that would lead to decentralization and greater powers for areas held by pro-Russian separatists. The same day Voshchevsky tendered in his resignation. Parliament accepted the resignation on 17 September 2015; after failing to pass the motion four times on 15 September 2015.

== Paradise Papers ==
Voshchevsky's showed in the Paradise Papers release as the majority shareholder of a Maltese company, Marfa Holding Ltd.

Political offices
Preceded by ?	Vice Prime Minister of Ukraine; 2014–2015	Succeeded by Oleksandr Sych
