= Yatsenyuk Government =

Yatsenyuk Government may refer to these cabinets of Ukraine headed by Arseniy Yatsenyuk as Prime Minister:

- First Yatsenyuk government, created following the aftermath of the 2014 Ukrainian revolution, active February–November 2014
- Second Yatsenyuk government, created after the conclusion of the 2014 Ukrainian parliamentary election, December 2014–April 2016
