= Ukrainian Strategy of Groysman =

Political party in Ukraine

Ukrainian Strategy of Groysman Українська стратегія Гройсмана
- Leader: Volodymyr Groysman
- Founder: Andriy Smolyaninov
- Founded: 14 January 2015
- Headquarters: Kyiv, Ukraine
- Ideology: Pro-Europeanism
- Political position: Centre to centre-left
- Verkhovna Rada: 0 / 450
- Regions: 680 / 43,122
- Vinnytsia Oblast Council: 40 / 84

Website
- strategy.ua

The Ukrainian Strategy of Groysman (Ukrainian: Українська стратегія Гройсмана, romanized: Ukrains'ka stratehiia Hroismana, USH) is a Ukrainian political party, led and conceived by former Ukrainian Prime Minister Volodymyr Groysman.

== History ==
The party was founded in January 2015 as People's Tribune (Ukrainian: Народна трибуна) and was led by Andriy Smolyaninov. In August 2015 the party was renamed and rebranded as the local party (for Vinnytsia) Vinnytsia European Strategy (Ukrainian: Вінницька європейська стратегія). At that time (from March 2006 until February 2014) Volodymyr Groysman was Mayor of Vinnytsia. Many of the deputies of the Vinnytsia City Council elected in the 2010 Ukrainian local elections for Conscience of Ukraine (Groysman himself was elected Mayor of Vinnytsia for it during the election) joined the party. In the 2015 Ukrainian local elections the party won 20 representatives to the Vinnytsia City Council (including Groysman's father). In the Vinnytsia City Council its deputies formed a coalition with representatives of Petro Poroshenko Bloc "Solidarity". Groysman had joined this party in 2014 (and was elected to parliament in the 2014 Ukrainian parliamentary election as number 8 on its party list). From 2016 to 2019, the party was called "Ukrainian Strategy". Groysman was Prime Minister of Ukraine from April 2016 to August 2019.

Groysman left the Petro Poroshenko Bloc "Solidarity" on 23 April 2019. On 24 May 2019, Groysman announced that he would take part in the 2019 Ukrainian parliamentary election with the party Ukrainian Strategy. In June 2019 "Ukrainian Strategy" changed its name to "Ukrainian Strategy of Groysman". In the 2019 parliamentary election, the party's list featured then Minister of Education and Science Lilia Hrynevych, Minister of the Cabinet of Ministers Oleksandr Saienko, Minister of Culture Yevhen Nyshchuk, Minister of Justice Pavlo Petrenko and MPs Viktor Yelensky and Andriy Teteruk (both from the People's Front faction) and Deputy Head of the Presidential Administration Serhiy Marchenko. In the election, the party failed to win any parliamentary seats, having gaining 2.41% of the total votes while the election had a 5% election threshold. The party also failed to win a constituency seat. The party was successful in Vinnytsia Oblast, where it gained 15.39% of the votes, coming second to "Servant of the People" with its 37.91%.

In the 2020 Ukrainian local elections 567 people won seats in local councils on behalf of the party, that is about 1.72% of the available seats. All these mandates were won in Vinnytsia Oblast. There the party gained an absolute majority on the Vinnytsia City Council, with 34 out of the 54 seats; the party also had regional success, winning 40 of the 84 seats in the Vinnytsia Oblast Council. Ukrainian Strategy of Groysman candidate for Mayor of Vinnytsia Serhiy Morhunov was re-elected Mayor with 66% of the total votes.

== Election results ==
=== Verkhovna Rada ===
Year	Popular vote	% of popular vote	Overall seats won	Seat change	Government
2019	352,934	2.41	0 / 450	New	Extra-parliamentary

=== Vinnytsia Oblast Council ===
Year	Popular vote	% of popular vote	Overall seats won	Change	Government
2020	197,687	47.62	40 / 84	▲40	Coalition government
