= Iryna Friz =

Ukrainian politician

- Ірина Фріз
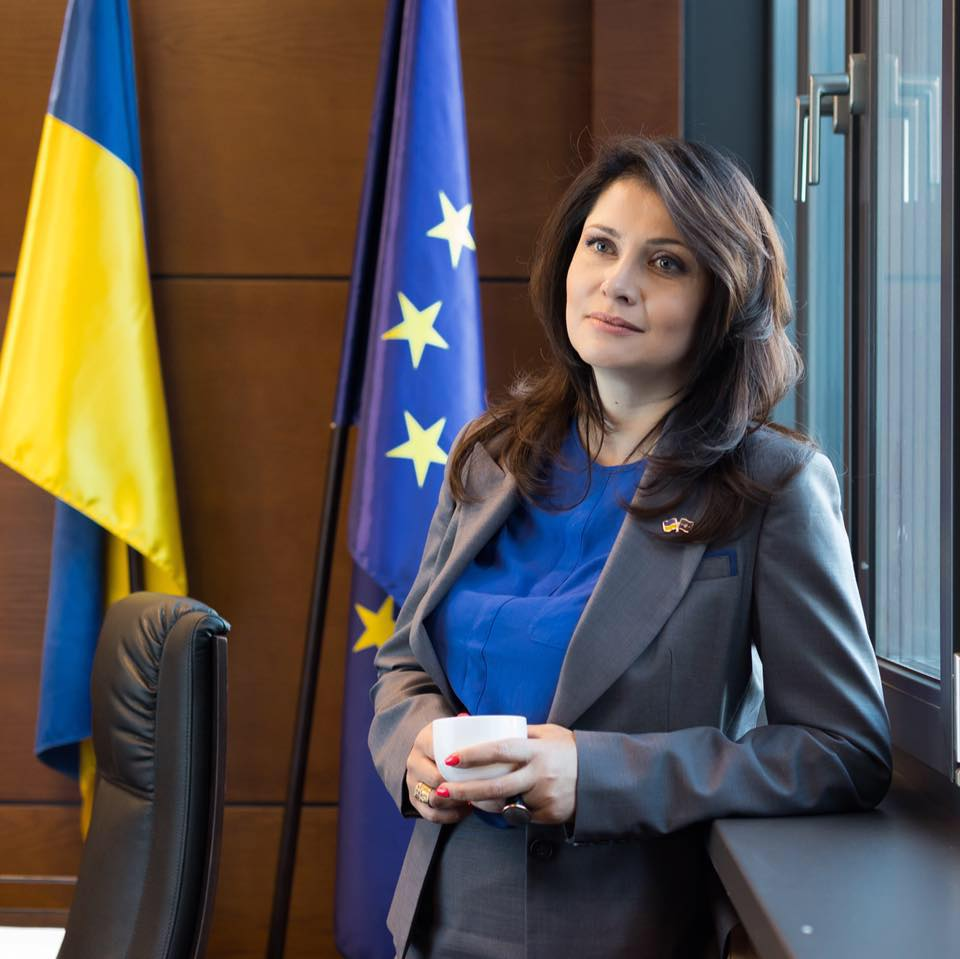

1st Minister for Veterans Affairs
- In office 22 November 2018 – 29 August 2019
- Prime Minister: Volodymyr Groysman
- Preceded by: Post created
- Succeeded by: Oksana Koliada

Personal details
- Born: September 25, 1974 (age 51) Yevpatoria, Crimea, Ukrainian SSR
- Education: National Academy of Visual Arts and Architecture (2003)

Iryna Vasylivna Friz (Ukrainian: Ірина Василівна Фріз, Russian: Ирина Васильевна Фриз, romanized: Irina Vasilyevna Friz; born 25 September 1974) is a Ukrainian politician who was Minister of the then newly created Ministry for Veterans Affairs in the Groysman government from November 2018 until August 2019. She was elected into the Ukrainian Parliament in 2014 as a member of the Petro Poroshenko Bloc and in the 2019 Ukrainian parliamentary election for European Solidarity.

== Biography ==
Friz was from May 2003 to March 2005 an assistant to then member of the Ukrainian parliament Petro Poroshenko. From March 2005 to August 2006 she was assistant secretary of the National Security and Defense Council of Ukraine and head of the press-service of the secretary of the National Security and Defense Council of Ukraine. From August 2006 until May 2008 Friz was again "Assistant-Consultant" in the Ukrainian parliament. Friz worked for the Council of the National Bank of Ukraine from May 2008 to January 2013.

In the election campaign of Petro Poroshenko during the 2014 presidential election Friz headed the information department of Poroshenko's election headquarters. Poroshenko won this election and became President of Ukraine in June 2014. Friz followed Poroshenko to the Presidential Administration of Ukraine where she was head of the Main Directorate of Public Communications and Information and head of the Main Department of Information Policy until December 2014.

During the October 2014 parliamentary elections Friz was elected into the Ukrainian parliament on the party list (30th place) of Petro Poroshenko Bloc.

On 22 November 2018 parliament appointed Friz minister of the newly created Ministry for Veterans Affairs in the Groysman government. She stayed on has minister until on 29 August 2019 the Honcharuk government was installed.

In the July 2019 Ukrainian parliamentary election Friz was elected to parliament for the party European Solidarity.

Friz is married and has two sons.

== Cooperation with NATO ==
On 9 September 2016, Iryna Friz headed the Permanent Delegation of Ukraine to the NATO Parliamentary Assembly.

On November 9, 2016, during a meeting with German Chancellor Angela Merkel, Friz presented a video on Russian troops in the Donbas, which was specially prepared by the international volunteer community InformNapalm.

At the spring session of the NATO PA in Tbilisi, Iryna Friz reported on the Russian Federation's ties to terrorist organizations in the Middle East.

In November 2016, in Brussels, during a meeting of the NATO-Ukraine Interparliamentary Council, she presented a report on Russia's subversive information and psychological operations on social networks.

In October 2017, Friz managed to organize the NATO PA for first time in Ukraine in 2020.

Friz is the author of the law on amendments to the legislation on the restoration of Ukraine's course to NATO membership.

Political offices
Preceded by Post created	Minister for Veterans Affairs; 2018–2019	Succeeded by Oksana Koliada
