= Ukrainian State Road Fund =

Trust fund within the Ukrainian state budget

Ukrainian State Road Fund is a trust fund within the special fund of the state budget of Ukraine, which accumulates funds for the construction, reconstruction, repair and maintenance of state and local roads. It was established in 2018.

== History ==
Due to chronic underfunding of the road industry in Ukraine, 95% of roads were in poor transport and operational condition, 40% of them need complete restoration as for 2018.

The bureaucratic system did not allow to achieve a better result, as most of the Ukrainian State Agency of Roads were being spent to repay previous commitments and credits.

On November 17, 2016, the Verkhovna Rada adopted three laws:

- On amendments to the Law of Ukraine "On sources of financing for the road sector of Ukraine" regarding the improvement of the mechanism for financing the road industry;
- On amendments to the Budget Code of Ukraine regarding the improvement of the mechanism of financial support for the road industry;
- On amendments to some laws of Ukraine on reforming the management system for public highways;

On December 20, 2017, the Groysman Government approved the procedure for directing funds from taxes directly to the state road fund.

=== 2018 ===
The road fund began operating on January 1, 2018.

The total funding of the road fund in 2018 amounted to ₴47 billion. Thanks to this, a record 3800 km of national and local roads have been restored.

=== 2019 ===
The special fund of the state budget of Ukraine for 2019 provided ₴50.4 billion for the State Road Fund.
