= Second Yatsenyuk Government =

Government of Ukraine

- 18th Cabinet of Ukraine (since 1990)

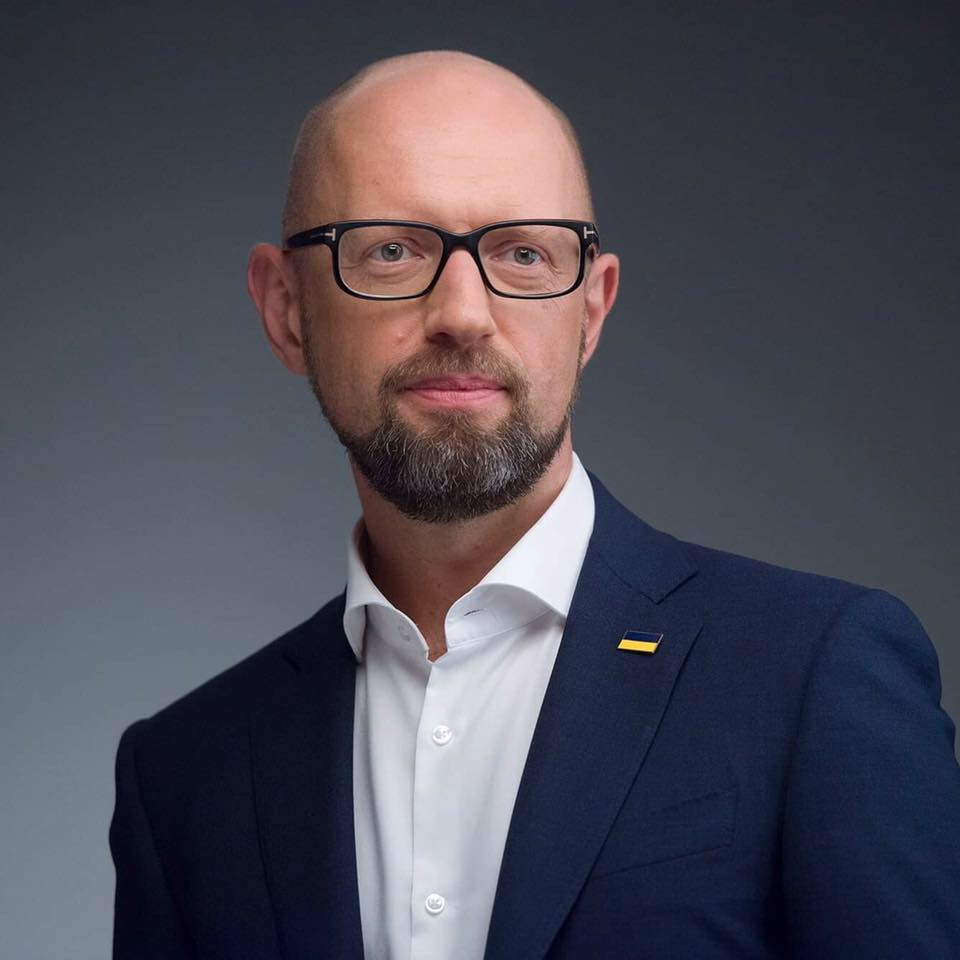
- Date formed: 2 December 2014
- Date dissolved: 14 April 2016

People and organisations
- Head of state: Petro Poroshenko
- Head of government: Arseniy Yatsenyuk
- Deputy head of government: Yuriy Zubko; Vyacheslav Kyrylenko; Valeriy Voshchevsky (until 17 September 2015)
- No. of ministers: 20
- Member parties: Petro Poroshenko Bloc "Solidarity"; People's Front; Self Reliance (until 18 February 2016); Fatherland (until 17 February 2016); Radical Party (until 1 September 2015)
- Status in legislature: Coalition
- Opposition party: Opposition Bloc
- Opposition leader: Yuriy Boyko

History
- Predecessor: First Yatsenyuk government
- Successor: Groysman government

The second Yatsenyuk government was created in Ukraine after the 2014 Ukrainian parliamentary election. On 2 December 2014, 288 members (of the 423) of the Ukrainian parliament approved the composition of the cabinet. The Government was backed by (the political parties) Petro Poroshenko Bloc, People's Front, Self Reliance, Fatherland and Radical Party.

Radical Party left the coalition on 1 September 2015.

After Fatherland and Self Reliance left the coalition on 17 and 18 February 2016 the coalition became 5 deputies short of the 226 needed. It was then disputed that Radical Party had left the coalition until on 29 March 2016 it was officially announced in parliament that on September 1, 2015, Radical Party had left the coalition.

On 10 April 2016 Prime Minister Yatsenyuk announced he resigned. On 14 April 2016 Yatsenyuk was replaced by new Prime Minister Volodymyr Groysman and thus the Groysman Government became the next cabinet of Ukraine.

== History ==
=== Formation ===
The morning after the 26 October 2014 Ukrainian parliamentary election the Petro Poroshenko Bloc and the People's Front started negotiations on forming a parliamentary coalition. 226 votes are needed to form a simple majority in the Verkhovna Rada. Late 27 October preliminary results indicated that both parties had won (together) 207 seats. By 30 October 2014 Self Reliance, Fatherland and the Radical Party were also involved in negotiations. On 31 October 2014, the Petro Poroshenko Bloc, the People's Front and Self Reliance formed "a joint trilateral group and that we will begin professional talks on our joint work, including on the drafting of a coalition agreement". According to deputy prime minister Volodymyr Groysman of the Petro Poroshenko Bloc his party was open to the possibility of Fatherland and the Radical Party joining this coalition. The same day the Petro Poroshenko Bloc stated it supported the candidacy of the People's Front's Arseniy Yatsenyuk (who was Prime Minister at the time) as Prime Minister of Ukraine.

On 21 November 2014, Petro Poroshenko Bloc, People's Front, Self Reliance, Fatherland and the Radical Party signed a coalition agreement.

On 27 November 2014, at the opening session of the new parliament, these 5 parliamentary factions formed a parliamentary coalition of 302 deputies. Following this Arseniy Yatsenyuk was confirmed as prime minister by 341 votes.

On 2 December 2014, Ukrainian president Petro Poroshenko granted citizenship to Natalie Jaresko, Alexander Kvitashvili and Aivaras Abromavičius, who were all potential ministers in the government. Later that day Jaresko, Kvitashvili and Abromavičius were confirmed as the Minister of Finance, Health and Economy.

==== Parliamentary voting ====
The approval of the composition of the government was marred by some last-minute delay and controversy when a group of deputies demanded that ministers be approved on an individual basis. This caused hours of debate, however, the government was approved in the proposed form by 288 deputies (of the 423).

For the candidacy of the prime minister of Ukraine, 341 members of parliament voted for Arseniy Yatsenyuk.

Faction	Number of members	Yes	No	Abstained	Did not vote	Absent
Petro Poroshenko Bloc	143	139	2	2	1	1
People's Front	83	83	0	0	0	0
Opposition Bloc	40	1	0	0	28	11
Non-affiliated	38	12	0	4	9	13
Self Reliance	32	32	0	0	0	0
Radical Party	22	21	0	1	0	0
People's Will	20	19	0	0	0	1
Fatherland	19	19	0	0	0	1
Economic Development	19	16	0	0	2	1
All factions	416	341	2	7	40	28

==== Additional decisions ====
Proposals	Yes	No	Abstained	Did not vote	Total
The composition of the Cabinet of Ministers of Ukraine	288	1	30	20	339
Appointment of Poltorak as Defense Minister	347	0	33	82	308
Appointment of Klimkin as Foreign Affairs Minister	351	0	0	32	383

=== Radical Party leaving coalition ===
Radical Party left the coalition on 1 September 2015 in protest over a vote in parliament involving a change to the Ukrainian Constitution that would lead to decentralization and greater powers for areas held by pro-Russian separatists. The same day Radical Party's Vice Prime Minister Valeriy Voshchevsky tendered in his resignation. Parliament accepted the resignation on 17 September 2015; after failing to pass the motion four times on 15 September 2015.

=== Fall ===
February 2016 saw the start of the fall of the cabinet after economy minister Aivaras Abromavičius announced his resignation claiming the government did not have a real commitment to fight corruption.

==== 16 February 2016 no-confidence vote and Fatherland and Self Reliance leaving the coalition ====
On 16 February 2016, president Petro Poroshenko asked Prime Minister Yatsenyuk to resign. Also on 16 February 2016 the government managed to survive a vote of no confidence from the Ukrainian parliament.

The next day Fatherland left the coalition since it believed that the previous day had shown that the government had turned into a "shadow clan-political coalition" that "doesn't want to carry out reforms". Fatherland would have liked the next government to be a technocratic government. Self Reliance then (also on 17 February 2016) issued an official statement on its Facebook page in which it argued "A cynical coup has occurred in Ukraine, with the help of the president, the prime minister, the kleptocratic part of the coalition, and the oligarch bloc" that led to the second Yatsenyuk government being an "illegitimate government". The next day Self Reliance left the coalition; meaning that the coalition became 5 deputies short of the 226 needed. Under Ukrainian law parliament has 30 days to form a new coalition after a Government coalition collapses; if it can not produce a new coalition new elections are needed. But on 19 February 2016 First Deputy Chairman of parliament Andriy Parubiy stated that since the Parliamentary Speaker had not officially announced in parliament that Radical Party had left the coalition this party was still a part of the parliamentary coalition. Also on 19 February 2016 Radical Party leader Oleh Lyashko stated in parliament that the Parliamentary Chairman had received a letter that announced that the Radical Party had left the coalition. It was officially announced in parliament that on 31 September 2015 Radical Party had left the coalition on 29 March 2016.

===== Vote of no confidence results =====
Faction	Number of members	Yes	No	Abstained	Did not vote	Absent
Petro Poroshenko Bloc	136	97	0	10	10	19
People's Front	81	0	1	0	2	78
Non-affiliated	51	28	0	2	1	20
Opposition Bloc	43	9	0	0	1	33
Self Reliance	26	25	0	0	1	0
Revival	23	0	0	0	11	12
Radical Party	21	15	0	0	0	6
People's Will	20	6	0	0	1	13
Fatherland	19	15	0	0	1	3
All factions	420	195	1	12	28	184

==== Final days of cabinet ====
On 10 April 2016 Yatsenyuk announced that he would resign as Prime Minister and would ask parliament to fire him on 12 April 2016. He added that his own party (People's Front) "remains in the coalition because today it is the only way to defend the state." On 25 March 2016 Parliamentary Speaker Volodymyr Groysman had been nominated by coalition partner Petro Poroshenko Bloc to replace Yatsenyuk. On 12 April parliament did not held a vote on Yatsenyuk's resignation, because (Yatsenyuk's party) People's Front and Petro Poroshenko Bloc could not agree on the forming of a new government. On 14 April 2016 parliament did hold a vote on his resignation resulting in Yatsenyuk being replaced by new Prime Minister Groysman and his Groysman Government.

== Composition ==
Under the Constitution of Ukraine the Ukrainian president submits nominations to parliament for the post of Minister of Foreign Affairs and minister of defense. On 2 December 2014, President Petro Poroshenko proposed that the Verkhovna Rada reappoint Pavlo Klimkin and Stepan Poltorak for these posts. The same day Poltorak was reappointed as Minister of Defense by 347 People's Deputies of Ukraine and Klimkin as Minister of Foreign Affairs by 351 votes. A few hours later 288 Deputies (of the 423) approved the composition of other ministers in one vote.

The Ministry of Information is a new ministry which oversees the information policy related to the 2014 pro-Russian unrest in Ukraine; according to its Minister Yuriy Stets one of its goals is "active counteraction to the Russian information aggression". Reporters Without Borders firmly opposed the creation of such a ministry, stating "the media should not be regulated by the government".

When Radical Party left the coalition on 1 September 2015 Radical Party's Vice Prime Minister Valeriy Voshchevsky tendered in his resignation.

On 2 July 2015, the Minister of Ecology Ihor Shevchenko was fired by parliament because "[the ministry] doesn't fulfill its basic functions and obligations".

During the lifespan of the second Yatsenyuk Government the Cabinet Ministers of agriculture, health and information Oleksiy Pavlenko, Alexander Kvitashvili and Yuriy Stets all announced and later withdrew their resignations.

On 11 December 2015 infrastructure minister Andriy Pyvovarsky resigned. Pyvovarsk was never formally dismissed by parliament.

On 4 February 2016 leader of Self Reliance parliamentary faction Oleh Berezyuk stated that Pavlenko no longer represented his party in the second Yatsenyuk Government.

When Fatherland left the Yatsenyuk Government on 17 February 2016 its minister Ihor Zhdanov refused to resign and hence was expelled from Fatherland.

Economy minister Aivaras Abromavičius announced his resignation on 3 February 2016 claiming the government did not have a real commitment to fight corruption. Just like Pyvovarsky, Abromavičius was never formally dismissed by parliament.

Nominating party key	Petro Poroshenko Bloc "Solidarity"
Nominating party key	People's Front
Nominating party key	Self Reliance
Nominating party key	Radical Party of Oleh Lyashko
Nominating party key	Fatherland
Presidential nominations	President Petro Poroshenko

Logo	Office	Incumbent
	Prime Minister	Arseniy Yatsenyuk
	Vice Prime Minister (communal housing and regional policy)	Hennadiy Zubko
	Minister of Regional Development, Construction and Communal Living	Hennadiy Zubko
	Vice Prime Minister (humanitarian policy)	Vyacheslav Kyrylenko
	Minister of Culture	Vyacheslav Kyrylenko
	Vice Prime Minister (infrastructure, ecology, and construction)	Valeriy Voshchevsky (until 17 September 2015)
	Vice Prime Minister (infrastructure, ecology, and construction)	vacant (no new appointment)
	Minister of Internal Affairs	Arsen Avakov
	Minister of Foreign Affairs	Pavlo Klimkin
	Minister of Finance	Natalie Jaresko
	Minister of Defense	Stepan Poltorak
	Minister of Social Policy	Pavlo Rozenko
	Minister of Justice	Pavlo Petrenko
	Minister of Health	Alexander Kvitashvili
	Minister of Education and Science	Serhiy Kvit
	Minister of Economy and Trade	Aivaras Abromavičius
	Ministry of Fuel and Energy	Volodymyr Demchyshyn
	Minister of Infrastructure of Ukraine	Andriy Pyvovarsky
	Minister of Information Policy	Yuriy Stets
	Minister of Agriculture	Oleksiy Pavlenko (before 4 February 2016 Pavlenko represented Self Reliance)
	Minister of Ecology and Natural Resources of Ukraine	Ihor Shevchenko (until 2 July 2015)
	Minister of Ecology and Natural Resources of Ukraine	Serhiy Kurykin (acting, from 12 August 2015)
	Minister of Ecology and Natural Resources of Ukraine	Anna Vronsky (acting, from 5 February 2016)
	Ministry of Youth and Sports	Ihor Zhdanov (Before 17 February 2016 Zhdanov represented Fatherland)
	Minister of the Cabinet of Ministers	Hanna Onyschenko
