= Serhiy Kvit =

Ukrainian journalist, educator, and activist

- Сергій Квіт
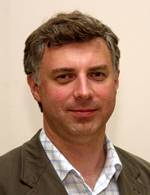

Minister of Education and Science of Ukraine
- In office February 27, 2014 – 14 April 2016
- Prime Minister: Arseniy Yatsenyuk
- Deputy: Maksym Strikha
- Preceded by: Dmytro Tabachnyk
- Succeeded by: Liliya Hrynevych

Personal details
- Born: November 26, 1965 (age 60) Uzhhorod, USSR
- Party: unaffiliated
- Education: Taras Shevchenko National University of Kyiv

Serhiy Myronovych Kvit (Ukrainian: Сергій Миронович Квіт; born 26 November 1965), is a Ukrainian literary critic, journalist, educator and social activist. Former champion of Ukraine in fencing (1984). Kvit has served as Rector (President) of the National University of Kyiv-Mohyla Academy from 2007 until 2014 and again since 2022. He occupied the position of Minister of Education and Science of Ukraine in 2014-2016 when the progressive Laws on Higher Education (2014) and On Science and Research (2015) were adopted. In 2015, Kvit signed an agreement that allowed Ukrainian scientists and businesses to fully participate in Horizon 2020 (H2020), the European Union’s flagship research program.

== Childhood and education ==
Serhiy Kvit was born in the Ukrainian city of Uzhhorod, Zakarpattia region. In 1982, Kvit graduated from high school No 17 in Lviv. In 1983–1985, in connection with military service, Serhiy served in the 29th separate sports company of the Prykarpattia Military District, Soviet Army.

After military service he entered the preparatory department of the Faculty of Journalism of the Taras Shevchenko Kyiv State University, graduating in 1991. At the same time, during his student years, Serhiy Kvit started working as a journalist. In 1990 he became a founding member of the New Literature Association.

In 1986-1991 he studied at the faculty of journalism at the Taras Shevchenko National University.

Kvit obtained a Ph.D. from the Ukrainian Free University in Munich (2001) and also holds a doctorate in philology from the Taras Shevchenko National University (2002). He subsequently held Fulbright scholarships at Ohio University and Stanford University (USA), a Kennan Institute scholarship at the Woodrow Wilson International Centre in Washington DC and a DAAD (German Academic Exchange Service) scholarship at the University of Cologne.

== Media activities ==
After graduating from the university, in the same year, he began working in the specialty as an editor of the department in the journal "Word and Time", Taras Shevchenko Institute of Literature of the National Academy of Sciences of Ukraine. In 1993, Kvit became the editor-in-chief of the journal Ukrainian Problems, and two years later he became a member of the Mykola Mikhnovsky Scientific Society.

In 1999, Kvit headed the press and book publishing department of the State Committee for Information Policy, Television and Radio Broadcasting of Ukraine.

Serhiy Kvit is a prominent commentator on educational and mass media issues. In 2002-07 he was Dean of the National University of Kyiv-Mohyla Academy's social studies faculty. He founded the Kyiv-Mohyla School of Journalism in 2001 and became President of the Media Reform Centre, set up to initiate open debate and promote more transparent media and government. In 2005-2011 he served as chairman of the Consortium of University Autonomy. Dr. Kvit's research focuses on educational and media reforms, mass communications, and philosophical hermeneutics; he has published several books and numerous articles. In the university, in addition to teaching, he also graduated from the Kyiv-Mohyla Business School, in 2004 he passed the module "Strategy in conditions of turbulence", in 2005 "Mastery of human resources management", in 2011 "Adizes Problem Solving", and in 2021 Program "School for Strategy Architects".

== Ministership ==
After the Revolution of Dignity, Kvit was appointed Minister of Education and Science of Ukraine by the first Yatsenyuk Government on 27 February 2014 and continued to hold the post under the second Yatsenyuk Government. On July 1, 2014, the Verkhovna Rada of Ukraine adopted the Law on Higher Education, and on July 31, it was signed by President Petro Poroshenko.

In the October 2014 parliamentary election, Kvit was elected to Ukraine's parliament Verkhovna Rada on the Petro Poroshenko Bloc electoral list (placed 11th on this list). The Verkhovna Rada terminated his powers as a People's Deputy when he was re-appointed to the Cabinet of Ministers of Ukraine on 2 December 2014.

On November 26, 2015, the Verkhovna Rada of Ukraine approved the Law "On Scientific and Scientific-Technical Activity (On Science and Research) Reform of higher education during the term of Serhiy Kvit was carried out through the implementation of the concept of comprehensive university autonomy. On November 27, 2015, he was awarded among Best Ukraine’s reformers on the 20th anniversary of the Kyiv Post Gala.

He did not retain his post in the Groysman Government that was installed on 14 April 2016. Serhiy Kvit is a Honoris Causa of Transcarpathian Academy of Arts, Uzhhorod (2017).

== Post-ministership ==
In 2019-2021, Serhiy Kvit was the Head of the National Agency for Higher Education Quality Assurance and a professor of Kyiv-Mohyla School of Journalism.

He again headed the National University of Kyiv-Mohyla Academy in 2022.

== Political activities ==
Kvit was a member of the Ukrainian paramilitary organization the Stepan Bandera All-Ukrainian Organization «Tryzub». Tryzub became the basis for the formation of the right-wing coalition Right Sector, an organization that played a significant role in the 2014 Ukrainian revolution, and Tryzub's leader, Dmytro Yarosh, became the leader of Right Sector. Serhiy Kvit is a friend of Dmytro Yarosh.

== Research activities ==
Serhiy Kvit's scientific interests, first of all, concern philosophical hermeneutics, mass communications, university management. He is the author of the scientific monograph "Hermeneutics of Style", which was published by the Publishing House "Kyiv-Mohyla Academy" in 2011.

== Selected works ==
- Kvit, Serhiy (2018). Mass Communications. – Kyiv, PH "Kyiv-Mohyla Academy". – 350 p.: https://kvit.ukma.edu.ua/wp-content/uploads/2019/02/Mass-Communications-2018.pdf
- Kvit, Serhiy (2018). A roadmap to higher education reform via autonomy // University World News. - 16 March 2018 Issue No:497: https://www.universityworldnews.com/article.php?story=20180316092127837
- Kvit, Serhiy (2011). The Hermeneutics of Style. – Kyiv, PH "Kyiv-Mohyla Academy". – 125 p.: https://ekmair.ukma.edu.ua/bitstream/handle/123456789/1086/Kvit_Hermeneutics%20of%20Style.pdf;jsessionid=E8A41C0F64096232AE683E1A2A2C3CCF?sequence=1
