= Aivaras Abromavičius =

Lithuanian-Ukrainian investor and politician

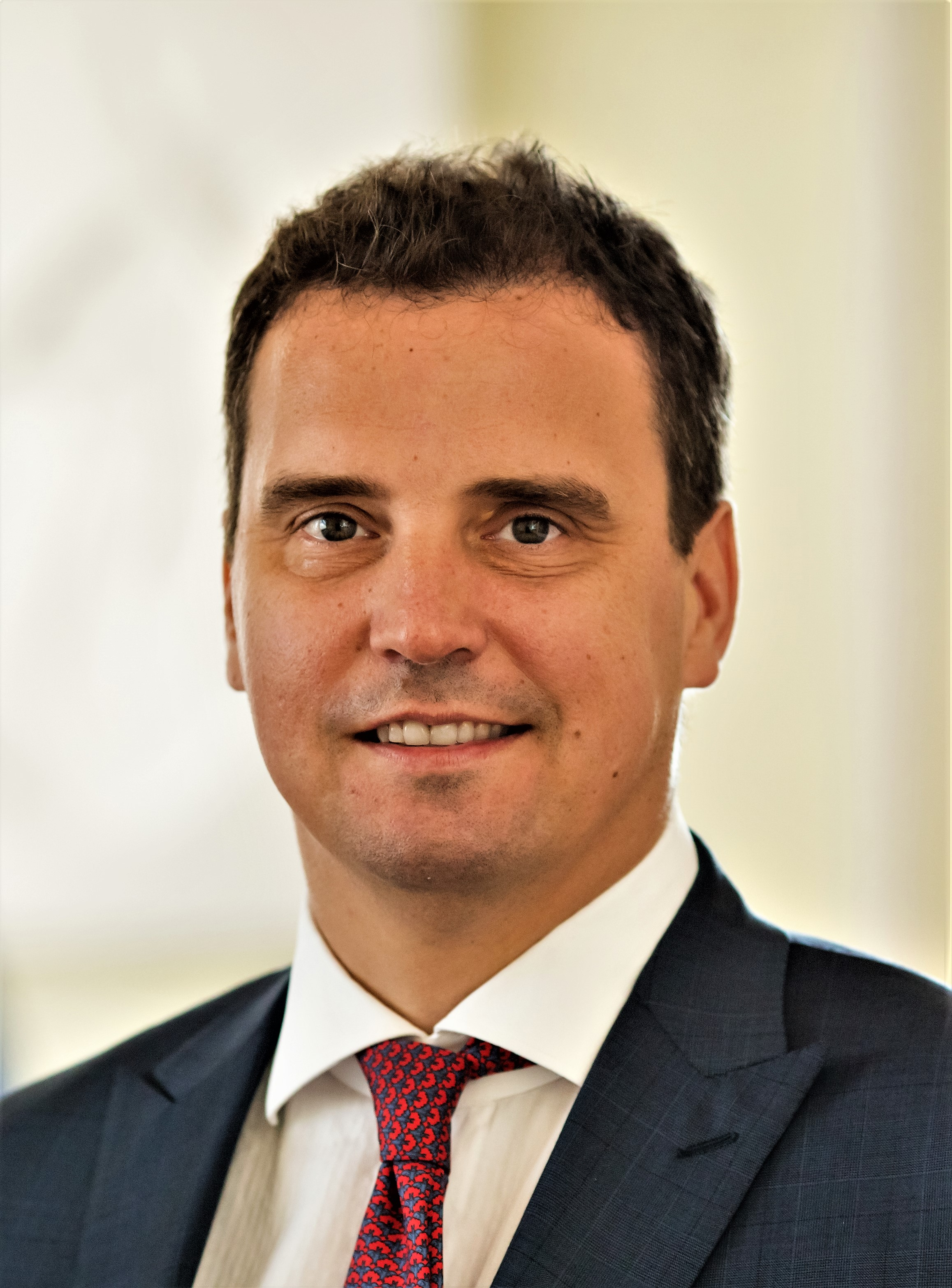

Director General of Ukroboronprom
- In office 31 August 2019 – 6 October 2020
- Preceded by: Pavlo Bukin
- Succeeded by: Ihor Fomenko

5th Minister of Economical Development and Trade
- In office 2 December 2014 – 14 April 2016
- Prime Minister: Arseniy Yatsenyuk
- Preceded by: Pavlo Sheremeta
- Succeeded by: Stepan Kubiv

Personal details
- Born: 21 January 1976 (age 50) Vilnius, Lithuania (then USSR)
- Education: Concordia International University Estonia; Concordia University Wisconsin; PhD in Economics and Trade from Wisconsin International University in Ukraine

Aivaras Abromavičius (Ukrainian: Айварас Абромавичус, born 21 January 1976) is a Lithuanian-born investor and politician. He was Ukraine's Minister of Economy and Trade starting in December 2014 (Abromavičius announced his resignation on 3 February 2016). He did not retain his post in the Groysman Government that was installed on 14 April 2016. Abromavičius was Director General of Ukroboronprom, Ukraine's largest defense industry enterprise, from 31 August 2019 until 6 October 2020. He was a majority shareholder of Ukrainian agricultural company Agro Region until the sale in January 2026 to Kernel-related Enselco

== Biography ==
Abromavičius was born in Vilnius, Lithuania, but lived in Estonia, Sweden, USA, Russia, UK and Ukraine for many years. He was educated in Lithuania later obtaining a BA in international business from Concordia International University Estonia and Concordia University Wisconsin. He started his career in finance in 1996 at the then Hansabank (now part of Swedbank). During 2002–2014, he co-owned and was at the core of building a Stockholm-based investment company East Capital, one of the largest and most reputable Investment companies from western Europe investing in eastern Europe.

In 2004 Abromavičius married a Ukrainian woman from Donetsk and in 2008 they settled in Kyiv, where their three children were born.

After the 2014 Ukrainian revolution Abromavičius, a Lithuanian citizen, was asked to serve as Minister of Economic Development and Trade of Ukraine. Ukrainian President Petro Poroshenko granted citizenship to Abromavičius, Natalie Jaresko and Alexander Kvitashvili on 2 December 2014 to allow them to serve as ministers in the Second Yatsenyuk Government. Abromavičius speaks Ukrainian, Lithuanian, English and Russian.

Under his leadership a completely new Electronic Public Procurement System Prozorro was launched, which received multiple international awards and recognition and saved billions of Hryvnias. He also kick started a major State Owned Enterprise reform that included totally new CEO selection process and helped form a new and first truly independent Board of Directors at Naftogaz. He also helped start a Better Regulation Delivery Office with substantial EU funding to improve business climate in Ukraine.

On 3 February 2016, Abromavičius announced his resignation, he claimed that the key reason was a conflict with Ihor Kononenko, who was the deputy head of the Bloc of Petro Poroshenko parliamentary faction. According to Abromavičius, Kononenko was trying to install a new deputy in the economy ministry to further his own interests. On the same day, Kononenko stated he was ready to give up his parliamentary mandate should his faction would ask him to do so. Abromavičius also stated that Ukrainian politicians insisted that he appointed at state companies people he did not want to and resisted the economic reforms. He also mentioned that corruption in Ukraine was too strong, and he was not willing to serve cover for corruption. Nine Western ambassadors signed a statement (published on the official website of the Embassy of Sweden) on 3 February 2016 that stated they were "deeply disappointed by the resignation" because Abromavičius delivered real reform results for Ukraine. He was finally relieved from his post when the Groysman Government was installed in 14 April 2016.

In 2019 Abromavičius returned to the political arena of Ukraine, when he set up meetings for presidential candidate Volodymyr Zelenskyy. On June 12, 2019, President of Ukraine Zelenskyy appointed Abromavičius to serve as a Member of the Supervisory Board at Ukroboronprom. On 31 August 2019 President Zelenskyy appointed Abromavičius as the Director General of Ukroboronprom. He was dismissed from this post (at his own request) by a decree of President Zelenskyy on 6 October 2020.

Currently Aivaras holds positions of Chairman of the Board in Agro Region, Ukrainian Corporate Governance Academy as well as PN Project in Riga. He is also a co-founder and board member of Goindex, a pension fund management company in Lithuania.

Abromavičius is a proponent of austerity, advocating "radical spending cuts" as well as deregulation and privatisation.
