= Groysman Government =

Government of Ukraine

- 19th Cabinet of Ukraine (since 1990)

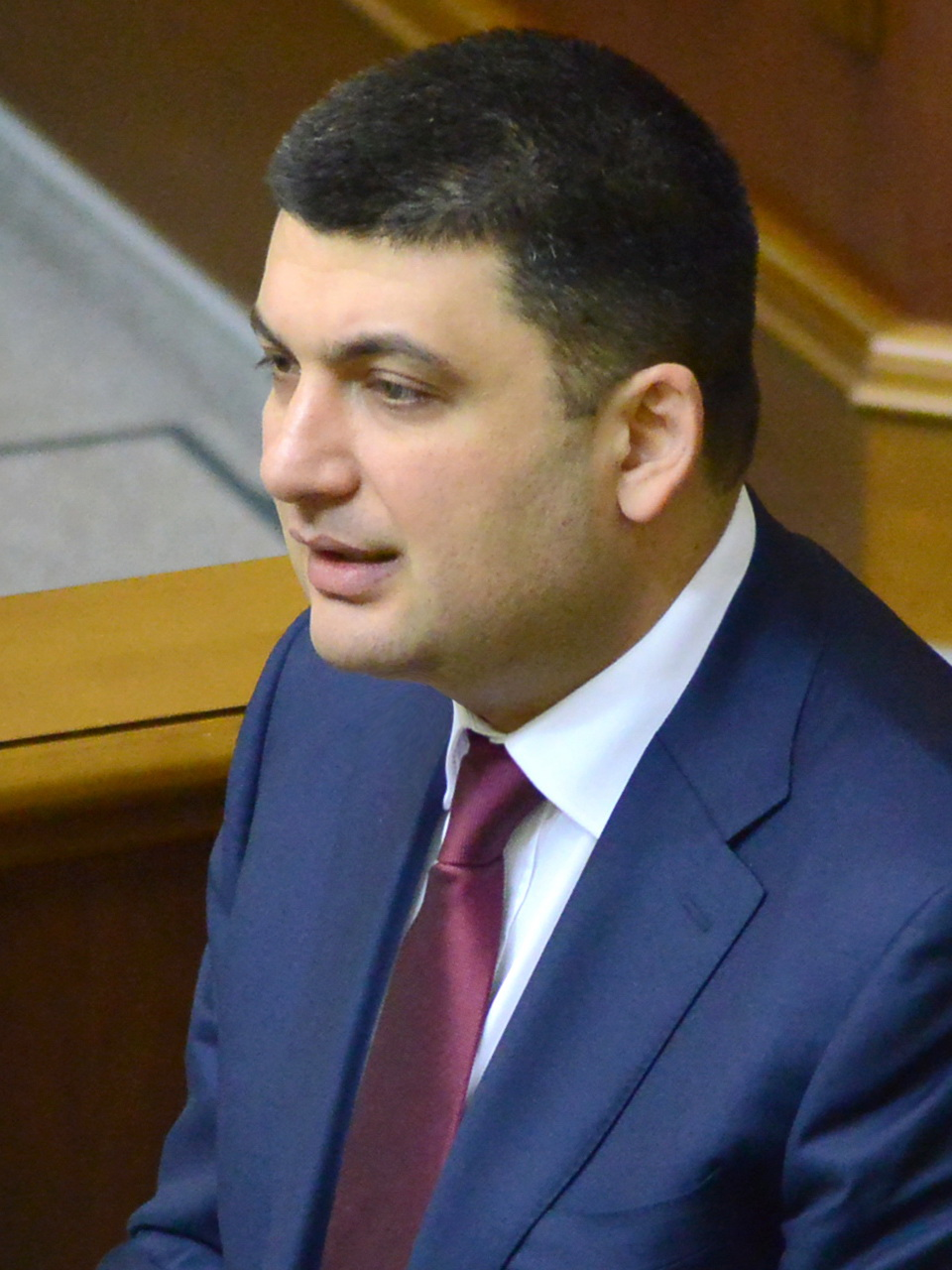
- Date formed: 14 April 2016
- Date dissolved: 29 August 2019

People and organisations
- Head of state: Petro Poroshenko; Volodymyr Zelenskyy
- Head of government: Volodymyr Groysman
- Deputy head of government: Stepan Kubiv; Volodymyr Kistion; Ivanna Klympush-Tsintsadze; Pavlo Rozenko; Vyacheslav Kyrylenko; Hennadiy Zubko
- No. of ministers: 24
- Member parties: Petro Poroshenko Bloc; People's Front
- Status in legislature: Coalition
- Opposition parties: Opposition Bloc; Batkivshchyna; Self Reliance; Radical Party
- Opposition leaders: Yuriy Boyko; Yulia Tymoshenko, Andriy Sadovyi; Oleh Lyashko

History
- Predecessor: Second Yatsenyuk government
- Successor: Honcharuk government

The Groysman government was formed on 14 April 2016, led by Volodymyr Groysman. It was the third Ukrainian cabinet formed since the 2014 Ukrainian revolution, following on from the first and second Yatsenyuk governments.

== History ==
=== Formation ===
On 10 April 2016, Arseniy Yatsenyuk announced that he would resign as Prime Minister and would ask parliament to fire him on 12 April 2016. On 25 March 2016, Parliamentary Speaker Volodymyr Groysman had been nominated by coalition partner Petro Poroshenko Bloc to replace Yatsenyuk. On 12 April parliament did not hold a vote on Yatsenyuk's resignation, because (Yatsenyuk's party) People's Front and Petro Poroshenko Bloc could not agree on the forming of a new government. On 14 April Groysman was confirmed by the Verkhovna Rada (Ukraine's parliament) as Prime Minister.

As Petro Poroshenko Bloc and People's Front together lacked a parliamentary majority (and a couple of both parties' parliamentarians voted "against" the Groysman government) the government creation became possible because almost all MP's of Revival and People's Will voted for the establishment of the coalition.

==== Parliamentary voting ====
Faction	Number of members	Yes	No	Abstained	Did not vote	Absent
Petro Poroshenko Bloc	146	131	4	3	1	7
People's Front	81	75	0	2	1	3
Opposition Bloc	43	0	34	0	3	6
Non-affiliated	42	13	8	8	5	8
Self Reliance	26	0	2	22	0	2
Revival	23	23	0	0	0	0
Radical Party	21	1	1	0	19	0
People's Will	19	16	0	0	2	1
Fatherland	19	0	1	13	2	3
All factions	420	259	50	48	33	30

==== Additional decisions ====
Proposals	Yes	No	Abstained	Did not vote	Total
The composition of the Cabinet of Ministers of Ukraine	240	48	39	20	367

== Composition ==
Under the Constitution of Ukraine the Ukrainian President submits nominations to parliament for the post of Minister of Foreign Affairs and Minister of Defense. When the Groysman Government was installed Pavlo Klimkin was reappointed as Foreign minister and Stepan Poltorak was reappointed as Minister of Defence.

The post of Minister of Health is vacant since the Groysman Government was formed (on 14 April 2016). Naturalised Ukrainian American Ulana Suprun was appointed acting Minister on 27 July 2016. On 11 July 2015, President Petro Poroshenko had granted Suprun Ukrainian citizenship.

After a conflict with Prime Minister Groysman the Verkhovna Rada on 7 June 2018 dismissed Finance Minister Oleksandr Danylyuk, the next day Oksana Markarova was appointed acting Finance Minister. On 22 November 2018, parliament appointed her as Finance Minister. The same day Iryna Friz was appointed to the new post of Minister of Veterans Affairs. On 27 February 2018, parliament adopted an appeal to the Cabinet of Ministers on the creation of this Ministry for Veterans Affairs.

Agriculture Minister Taras Kutovy was dismissed by parliament on 22 November 2018, on 7 December 2018 Maxim Martynyuk was appointed acting Minister of Agriculture.(in Ukrainian)

Nominating party key	Petro Poroshenko Bloc "Solidarity"
Nominating party key	People's Front
Presidential nominations	President Petro Poroshenko

Logo	Office	Incumbent
	Prime Minister	Volodymyr Groysman
	First Vice Prime Minister	Stepan Kubiv
	Minister of Economic Development and Trade	Stepan Kubiv
	Vice Prime Minister (European and EuroAtlantic integration)	Ivanna Klympush-Tsintsadze
	Vice Prime Minister	Hennadiy Zubko
	Minister of Regional Development	Hennadiy Zubko
	Vice Prime Minister (humanitarian policy)	Vyacheslav Kyrylenko
	Vice Prime Minister (infrastructure, fuel/energy complex, ecology)	Volodymyr Kistion
	Vice Prime Minister	Pavlo Rozenko
	Minister of Internal Affairs	Arsen Avakov
	Minister of Foreign Affairs	Pavlo Klimkin
	Minister of Finance	Oleksandr Danylyuk; Oksana Markarova
	Minister of Defence	Stepan Poltorak
	Minister of Social Policy	Andriy Reva
	Minister of Temporarily Occupied Territories and IDPs	Vadym Chernysh
	Minister of Justice	Pavlo Petrenko
	Minister of Health	Oleksandra Pavlenko (acting); Viktor Shafransky (acting); Ulana Suprun (acting)
	Minister of Education and Science	Liliya Hrynevych
	Ministry of Fuel and Energy	Ihor Nasalyk
	Minister of Infrastructure	Volodymyr Omelyan
	Minister of Information Policy	Yuriy Stets
	Minister of Agriculture	Taras Kutovy; Maxim Martynyuk (acting)
	Minister of Ecology and Natural Resources of Ukraine	Ostap Semerak
	Minister of Culture	Yevhen Nyshchuk
	Minister of Veterans Affairs	Iryna Friz
	Minister of Youth and Sports	Ihor Zhdanov
	Minister of the Cabinet of Ministers	Oleksandr Sayenko
