= First Yatsenyuk government =

Government of Ukraine

- 17th Cabinet of Ukraine (since 1990)

- Date formed: 27 February 2014
- Date dissolved: 27 November 2014

People and organisations
- Head of state: Oleksandr Turchynov (acting); Petro Poroshenko
- Head of government: Arseniy Yatsenyuk
- Deputy head of government: Oleksandr Sych; Volodymyr Groysman
- No. of ministers: 20
- Member party: Batkivshchyna; Svoboda
- Status in legislature: Coalition
- Opposition party: Party of Regions; Communist Party of Ukraine
- Opposition leader: Oleksandr Yefremov; Petro Symonenko

History
- Predecessor: Second Azarov government
- Successor: Second Yatsenyuk government

The first government headed by Arseniy Yatsenyuk was created in Ukraine on 27 February 2014 in the aftermath of the Revolution of Dignity. The cabinet was formed as a coalition of the Batkivschyna, UDAR and Svoboda political parties, the Economic Development and Sovereign European Ukraine parliamentary factions, and several unaffiliated MPs. On 24 July 2014, UDAR, Svoboda and 19 independent MPs exited the coalition to pave the way for the early parliamentary elections of late October 2014. Prime Minister Yatsenyuk announced his resignation the same day, but the Verkhovna Rada declined his resignation on 31 July 2014.

After the 26 October 2014 Ukrainian parliamentary election, the second Yatsenyuk government was formed.

== Creation ==
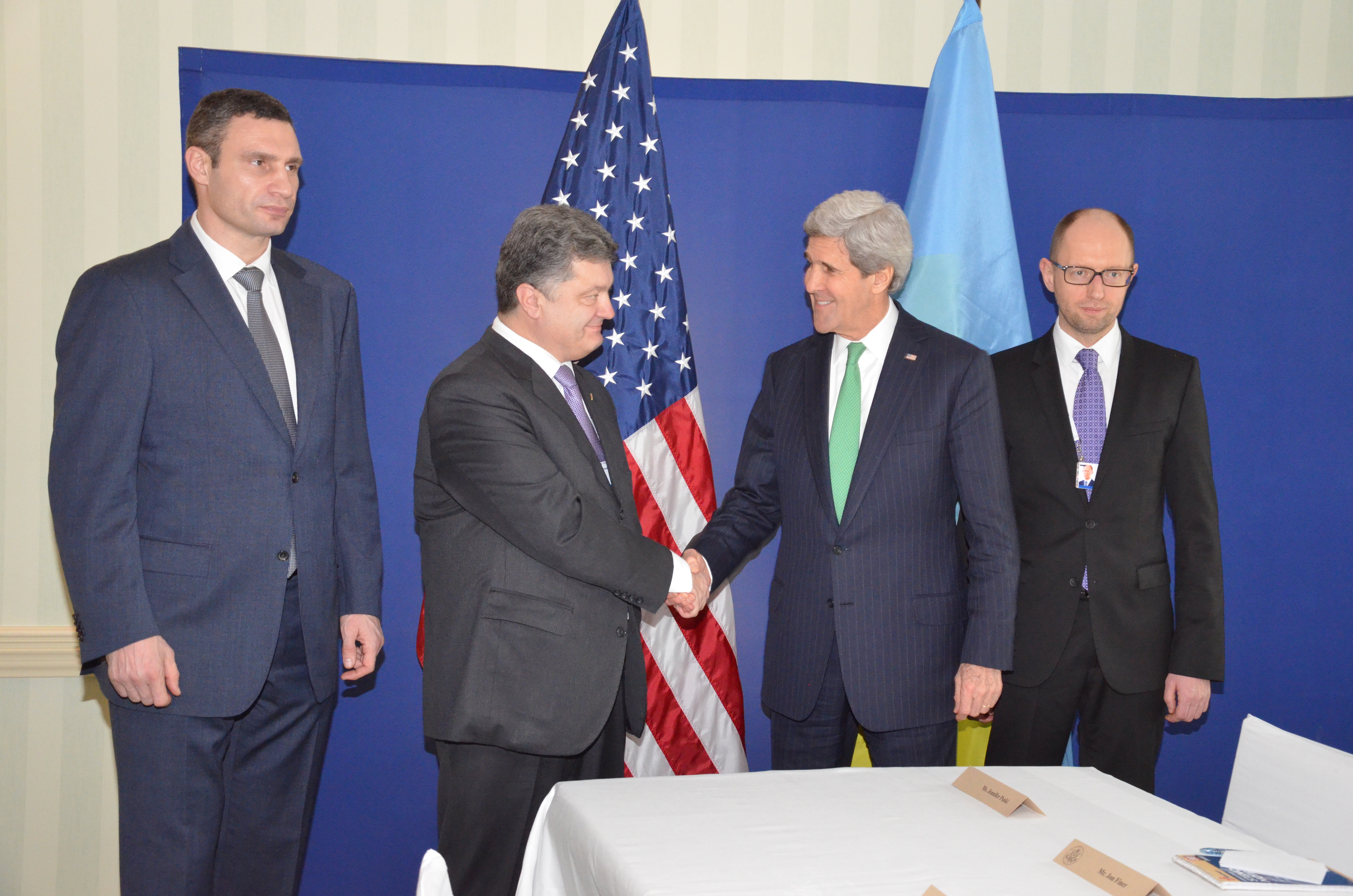
Euromaidan leaders Vitali Klitschko, Petro Poroshenko (second left) and Arseniy Yatsenyuk (right) with U.S. Secretary of State John Kerry, 30 January 2014

The Yatsenyuk government took office in the wake of the anti-government Euromaidan protests that began in 2013 and culminated in the 22 February 2014 dismissal of President Viktor Yanukovych. The government was first presented at Kyiv's main Euromaidan protest camp at Maidan Nezalezhnosti on 26 February 2014. The Verkhovna Rada then voted on the government on 27 February 2014. There were no government posts for the UDAR party, led by one of the Euromaidan leaders, Vitali Klitschko. UDAR declined offers to participate in the new government.

On its first day 250 MPs joined the coalition, including Batkivshchyna, UDAR, Svoboda, Economic Development and Sovereign European Ukraine.

=== Parliamentary voting ===
371 members of parliament voted to elect Arseniy Yatsenyuk as Prime Minister of Ukraine, only two votes short of the record-high 373 votes won by Yulia Tymoshenko in 2005.

Faction	Number of members	Yes	No	Abstained	Did not vote	Absent
Party of Regions	123	94	1	0	8	20
Batkivshchyna – United Opposition	88	85	0	0	0	3
UDAR	42	40	0	0	0	2
Svoboda	36	36	0	0	0	0
Communist Party of Ukraine	32	0	0	0	32	0
Not affiliated	59	51	0	2	2	4
Sovereign European Ukraine (group)	37	34	0	0	1	2
Economic Development (group)	32	31	0	0	0	1
All factions	450	371	1	2	43	33

==== Additional decisions ====
Proposals	Yes	No	Abstained	Did not vote	Total
The composition of the Cabinet of Ministers of Ukraine	331	1	2	43	417
Appointment of Deshchytsia as acting Foreign Affairs Minister	322	0	0	86	408
Appointment of Tenyukh the acting Defense Minister	326	0	0	82	408
Appointment of Klimkin as Foreign Affairs Minister	335	1	0	75	411
Resignation of Yatsenyuk as Prime Minister	16	109	2	184	311

== Changes in composition ==
=== Offices ===
On 1 March 2014, the Ministry of Revenues and Duties was liquidated. Its agencies were transferred to the Ministry of Finance. On 23 March 2014, the Ministry of Industrial Policy was merged with the Ministry of Economy and Trade.

=== Ministers ===
On 19 June 2014, First Vice Prime Minister Vitaly Yarema was appointed General Prosecutor of Ukraine. The same day, Pavlo Klimkin was appointed as Ukrainian foreign minister, replacing Andrii Deshchytsia.

On 2 September 2014, the Verkhovna Rada accepted the 21 August 2014 resignation of Pavlo Sheremeta, until then Minister of Economic Development and Trade.

== July 2014 coalition collapse ==
On 24 July 2014, the coalition supporting the Yatsenyuk government collapsed after UDAR and Svoboda announced that they had left the coalition to pave the way for early parliamentary elections. UDAR faction leader Vitaliy Kovalchuk explained his party's actions with his observation that "the Verkhovna Rada is not set for constructive work in accordance with the will of the Ukrainian people". In addition, 15 independent deputies and eight Batkivschyna deputies also quit the coalition, soon followed by four more independent deputies. Prime Minister Arseniy Yatsenyuk announced his resignation in the late afternoon on 24 July 2014. During his announcement of resignation in parliament Yatsenyuk hinted that the coalition had collapsed because politicians did not want to be seen involved in making budget cuts and had thus placed "political interest above the fate of the country"; according to him, this was "a moral and an ethical crime". Yatsenyuk's resignation had to be officially accepted by the parliament and it did not do this the next day; parliament's next chance to accept his resignation would be at its following session on 31 July 2014.

UDAR faction leader Vitaliy Kovalchuk stated that since Yatsenyuk had not written a letter of resignation ("and in accordance with the Constitution, Yatsenyuk had to file the verbal statement"), parliament could not accept his resignation; Kovalchuk argued that hence Yatsenyuk was still Prime Minister. Nevertheless, (also on 25 June 2014) the Yatsenyuk government appointed Deputy Prime Minister of Ukraine for Regional Policy – Minister of Regional Development, Construction and Housing and Communal Services of Ukraine Volodymyr Groysman as its acting Prime Minister. In the evening of 25 July, the parliamentary press service stated that the body had "received the statement of the Prime Minister of Ukraine of his resignation". The Verkhovna Rada declined his resignation on 31 July 2014, with only 16 out of 450 MPs voted for his resignation.

== Policy ==
In March 2014, the government stated that it did not intend to make Ukraine a member of NATO.

In early August 2014, the Yatsenyuk government introduced draft tax reform legislation that would reduce the number of taxes and fees from 22 to 9.

The government drew criticism over the repeal of a law that protected the official use of the Russian language in Ukraine.

== Composition ==
Party key	Batkivshchyna	6
Party key	Svoboda	3
Party key	Non-partisan/Undisclosed	9

Office	Incumbent
Prime Minister of Ukraine	Arseniy Yatsenyuk
First Vice Prime Minister (Law enforcement and power bloc)	Vitaly Yarema (until 19 June 2014)
First Vice Prime Minister (Law enforcement and power bloc)	Post vacant (from 19 June 2014)
Vice Prime Minister (Humanitarian Policy)	Oleksandr Sych
Vice Prime Minister (Regional Policy)	Volodymyr Groysman
Minister of Regional Development, Construction and Communal Living	Volodymyr Groysman
Minister of Justice	Pavlo Petrenko
Minister of Foreign Affairs	Andrii Deshchytsia (acting) (to 19 June 2014)
Minister of Foreign Affairs	Pavlo Klimkin (19 June 2014 --)
Minister of Finance	Oleksandr Shlapak
Minister of Social Policy	Lyudmyla Denisova
Minister of Health	Oleh Musiy (until 1 October 2014)
Minister of Health	Post vacant (from 1 October 2014)
Minister of Economy and Trade	Pavlo Sheremeta (until 2 September 2014)
Minister of Economy and Trade	Anatoliy Maksyuta (acting) from 3 September 2014)
Minister of Education and Science	Serhiy Kvit
Minister of Culture	Yevhen Nyshchuk
Minister of Defense	Ihor Tenyukh (acting) (until 25 March 2014)
Minister of Defense	Mykhailo Koval (acting) (from 25 March 2014 until 3 July 2014)
Minister of Defense	Valeriy Heletey (from 3 July 2014 until 14 October 2014)
Minister of Defense	Stepan Poltorak (from 14 October 2014)
Minister of Internal Affairs	Arsen Avakov
Minister of Agrarian Policy and Food	Ihor Shvaika
Ministry of Fuel and Energy	Yuriy Prodan
Minister of Ecology and Natural Resources of Ukraine	Andriy Mokhnyk
Minister of Infrastructure of Ukraine	Maksym Burbak
Ministry of Youth and Sports	Dmytro Bulatov
Minister of the Cabinet of Ministers	Ostap Semerak
Minister of Revenues and Duties	(office liquidated on 1 March 2014)
Minister of Industrial Policy	(office reorganized)

On 12 November 2014, the ministers of Svoboda resigned and became acting ministers until the formation of a new government.

== International response ==
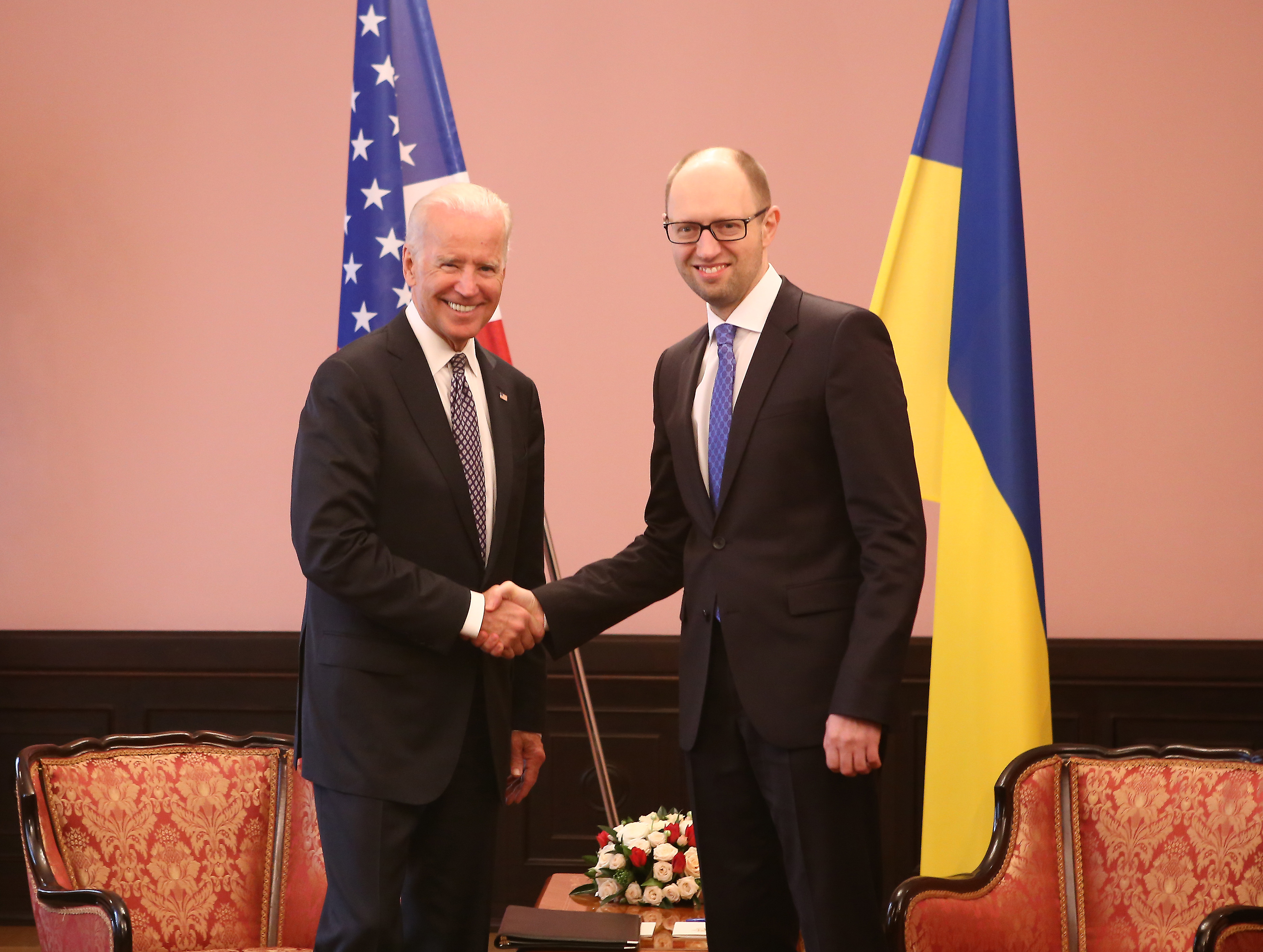
Arseniy Yatsenyuk and U.S. Vice President Joe Biden in Kyiv, Ukraine, 22 April 2014

A majority of the west recognized the government, including German Chancellor Angela Merkel, Prime Minister of Latvia Laimdota Straujuma, President of Belarus Alexander Lukashenko, and Prime Minister of Lithuania Algirdas Butkevičius. On 27 February 2014, U.S. Vice President Joe Biden told Yatsenyuk that his interim government had the full support of the United States.

A few days later, the United States Secretary of State John Kerry visited the Ukrainian capital of Kyiv on 4 March 2014 and met with Yatsenyuk. He was followed by members of the European Union, who met with members of his government prior to a EU summit on 6 March 2014.

Russia, however, denounced the events that led to the previous government's ouster as an illegitimate coup and considered the Yatsenyuk government illegitimate. (Note: Gumuchian; Morgan; Chance (2014) "Moscow has denounced the events that led to Yanukovych's ouster as an illegitimate coup and has refused to recognize the new Ukrainian authorities, putting the two countries on a collision course over control of Crimea, which has longstanding ties to Russia and has thousands of Russian troops stationed there.") (Note: Dawber (2014) "Vladimir Putin has given a confident performance in front of the media, insisting that the events of the last 10 days in Ukraine amounted to nothing less than a coup d'état.") (Note: The Washington Post (2014) "[Putin says:] Are the current authorities legitimate? The Parliament is partially, but all the others are not. The current Acting President is definitely not legitimate. There is only one legitimate President, from a legal standpoint. Clearly, he has no power. However, as I have already said, and will repeat: Yanukovych is the only undoubtedly legitimate President.") (Note: BBC News (2014) "But Crimea's First Deputy PM Rustam Temirgaliev dismissed the suggestion, saying Crimea views the new authorities in Kiev as illegitimate.")
