= Pavlo Sheremeta =

Ukrainian economist

- Павло Шеремета
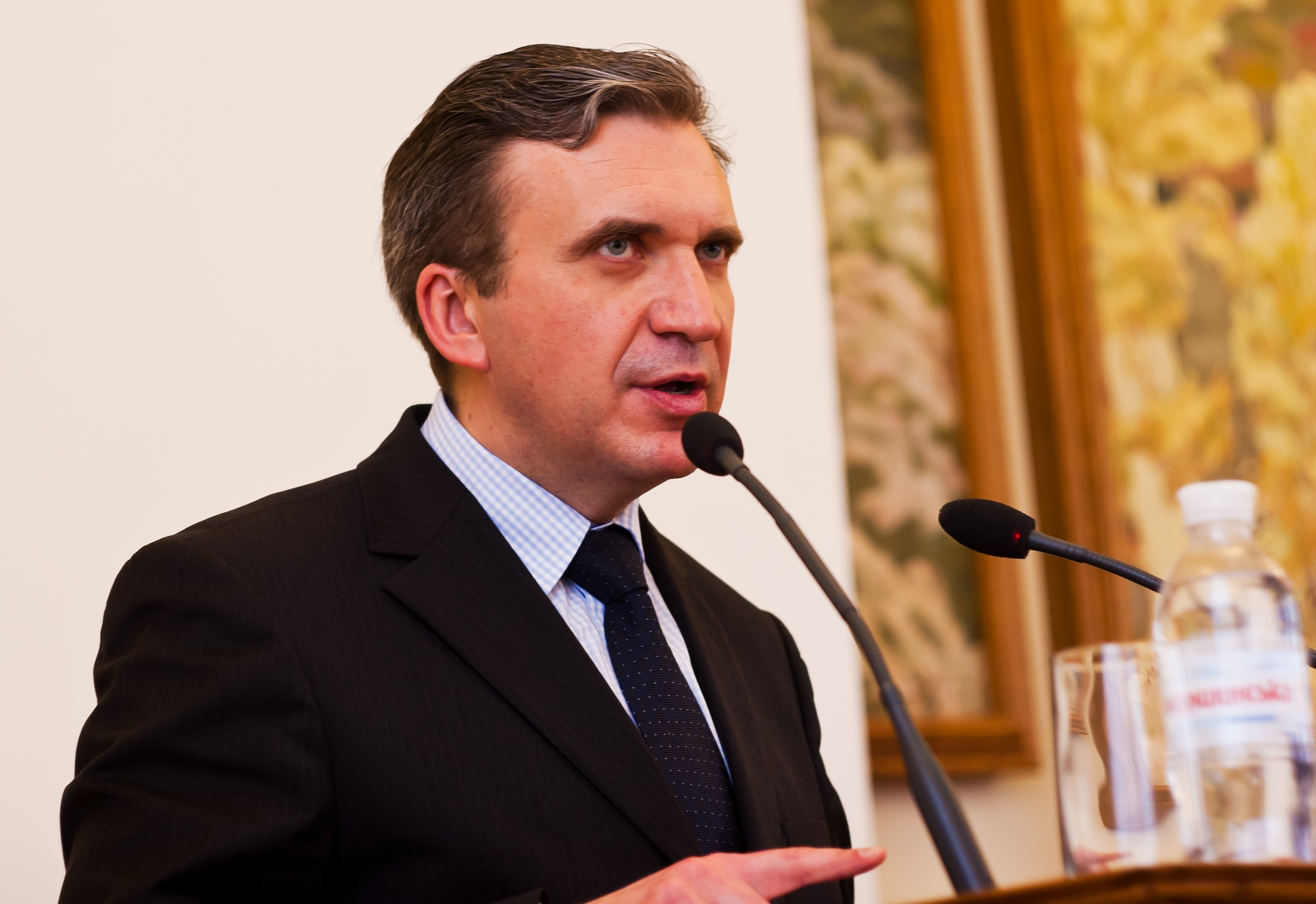
- Sheremeta in 2014

4th Minister of Economical Development and Trade
- In office February 27, 2014 – September 2, 2014
- Prime Minister: Arseniy Yatsenyuk
- Preceded by: Ihor Prasolov
- Succeeded by: Aivaras Abromavičius

Personal details
- Born: May 23, 1971 (age 55) Lviv, Ukraine
- Party: unaffiliated
- Spouse: Oksana Sheremeta
- Education: Lviv University; Emory University

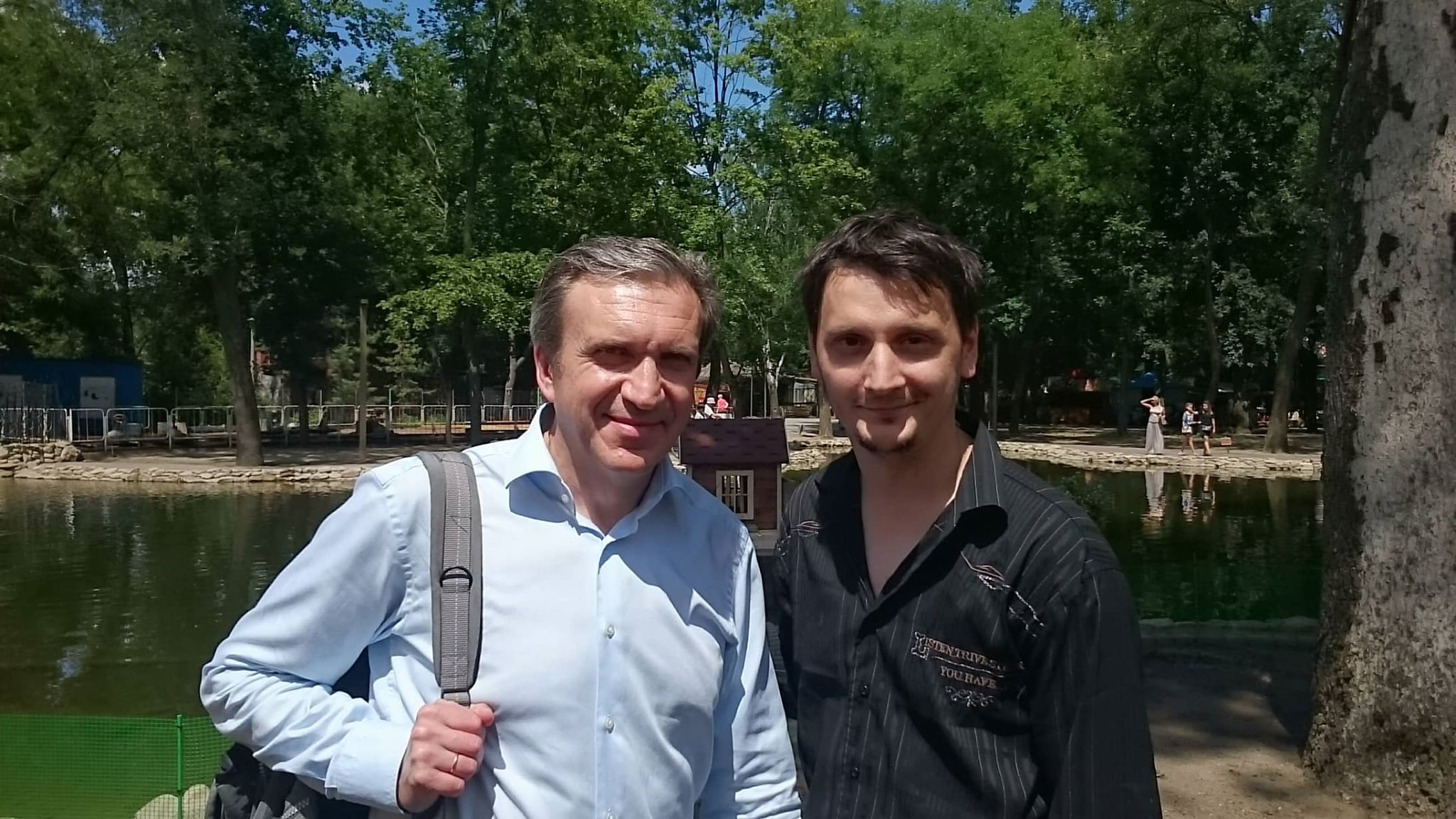

Pavlo Mykhaylovych Sheremeta (Ukrainian: Павло Михайлович Шеремета) is a Ukrainian economist and a former Minister of Economical Development and Trade of his country.

== Biography ==
Sheremeta was born on May 23, 1971, in Lviv, Ukraine. He earned his undergraduate degree in economics at the Lviv University and an MBA degree at Emory University in Atlanta, USA. He completed a number of management development programs at the Harvard Business School, the INSEAD Blue Ocean Strategy Institute, and the China Europe International Business School.

In 1999, Sheremeta founded the Kyiv Mohyla Business School, and became its first dean. From 2006–2010, he was Vice-President of the Central and East European Management Development Association. During 2008 to 2011, he was part of the team of the "Blue Ocean Strategy Institute" of Malaysia, which advised the Malaysian government on economic reforms. From November 2012 until February 2014 he was the President of the Kyiv School of Economics.

On February 27, 2014 Sheremeta became Minister of Economical Development and Trade of Ukraine in the Yatsenyuk Government. After it had already rumored (and denied by him then) Sheremeta confirmed his decision to resign as Minister on August 21, 2014. He had written his letter of resignation the day before and then it was sent to the Verkhovna Rada (Ukraine's parliament). Sheremeta explained his resignation as being due to the appointment of Valery Pyatnitsky to lead the (newly created) Institution of Trade Representative in Ukraine without his consent; and added he could not work anymore with "yesterday's people". He then stayed on as an acting Minister till September 2, when the Verkhovna Rada accepted Sheremeta resignation.

He has a reputation of being a radical privatizer and deregulator.
