= Hennadiy Temnyk =

Ukrainian engineer and politician

- Геннадій Темник
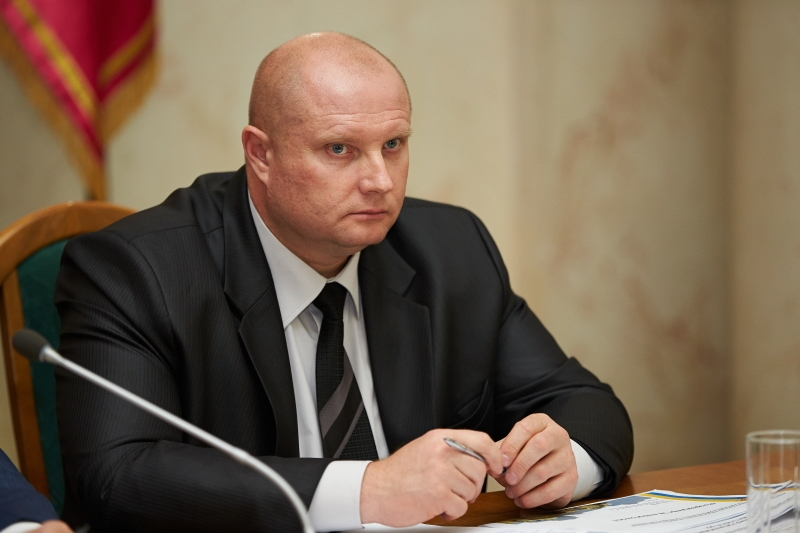
- Temnyk in 2013

Minister of Regional Development, Construction and Communal Living
- In office December 24, 2012 – February 27, 2014
- Prime Minister: Mykola Azarov
- Preceded by: Anatoliy Blyznyuk
- Succeeded by: Volodymyr Hroysman

Personal details
- Born: June 9, 1970 (age 56) Hurivka, Dolynska Raion, Kirovohrad Oblast, Ukraine SSR, Soviet Union
- Education: Voronezh Higher Military Aviation Engineering College

Hennadiy Temnyk is a Ukrainian politician, former Minister of Regional Development, Construction and Communal Living.

Temnyk was born on June 9, 1970, in a village of Hurivka, Dolynska Raion, Kirovohrad Oblast. In 1992 he graduated from the Voronezh Higher Military Aviation Engineering College as a meteorologist.

In 1993-94 Temnyk work in militsiya of Kryvyi Rih fighting organized crime. After that and until 2006 he worked for number of private and community companies in the region.

In 2006-2012 Temnyk became a politician for the Dnipropetrovsk regional government working as a mayor deputy of Kryvyi Rih and governor deputy of Dnipropetrovsk Oblast.

On December 24, 2012, he was appointed the minister of Regional Development, Construction and Communal Living.
