= Volodymyr Groysman =

Prime Minister of Ukraine from 2016 to 2019

- Володимир Гройсман
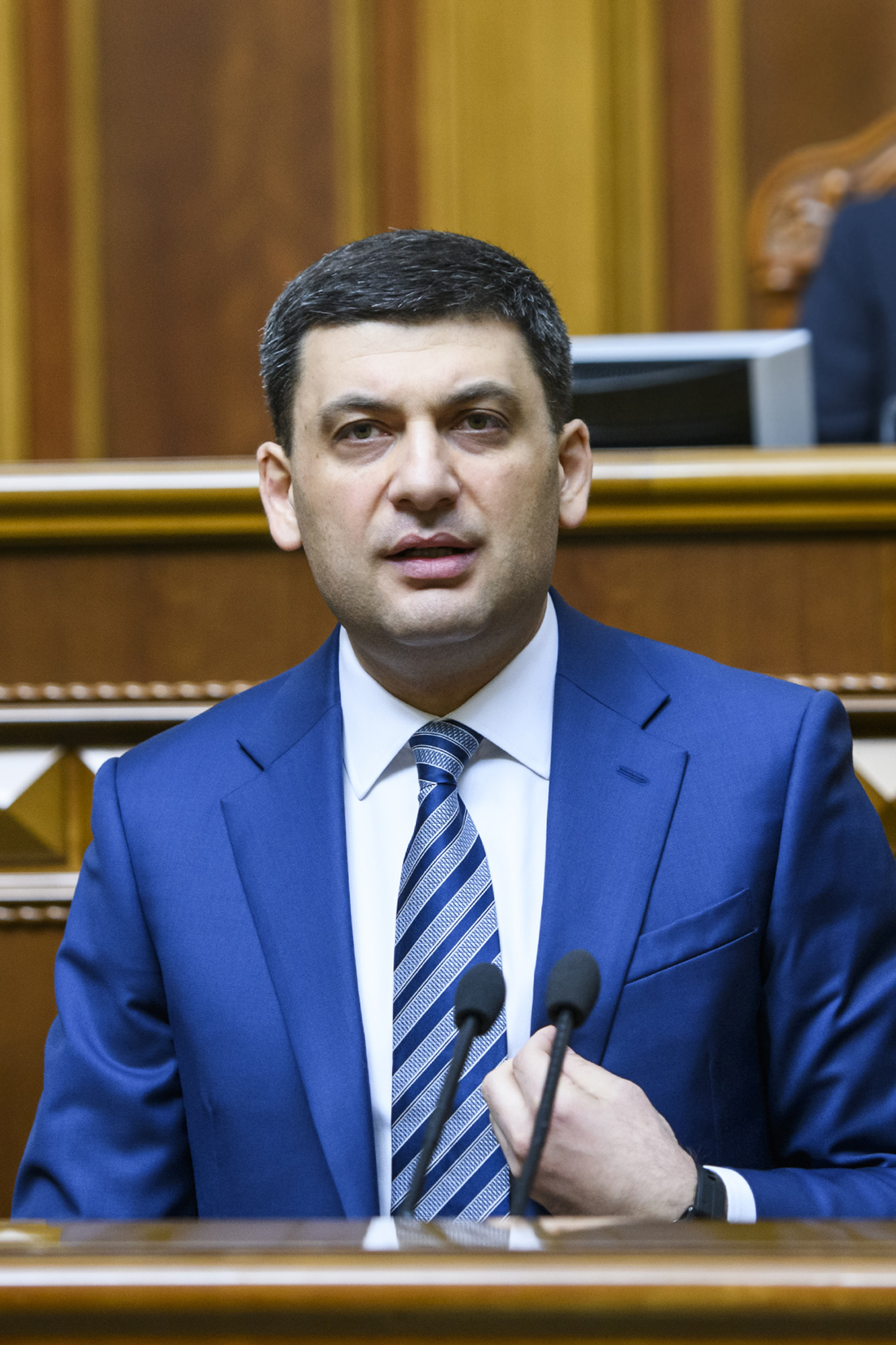
- Groysman in 2019

16th Prime Minister of Ukraine
- In office 14 April 2016 – 29 August 2019
- President: Petro Poroshenko; Volodymyr Zelenskyy
- Deputy: Stepan Kubiv
- Preceded by: Arseniy Yatsenyuk
- Succeeded by: Oleksiy Honcharuk
- Acting; 25 July 2014 – 31 July 2014
- President: Petro Poroshenko
- Preceded by: Arseniy Yatsenyuk
- Succeeded by: Arseniy Yatsenyuk

Chairman of the Verkhovna Rada
- In office 27 November 2014 – 14 April 2016
- President: Petro Poroshenko
- Preceded by: Oleksandr Turchynov
- Succeeded by: Andriy Parubiy

Minister of Regional Development, Construction and Communal Living
- In office 27 February 2014 – 27 November 2014
- Prime Minister: Arseniy Yatsenyuk
- Preceded by: Hennadiy Temnyk
- Succeeded by: Hennadiy Zubko

Mayor of Vinnytsia
- In office 28 March 2006 – 27 February 2014
- Preceded by: Oleksandr Dombrovskyi
- Succeeded by: Serhiy Morhunov

Personal details
- Born: 20 January 1978 (age 48) Vinnytsia, Ukrainian SSR, Soviet Union
- Party: Our Ukraine (2004–2010); Conscience of Ukraine (2010–2014); Petro Poroshenko Bloc (2014–2019); Ukrainian Strategy of Groysman (from 2019)
- Education: Interregional Academy of Personnel Management; National Academy for Public Administration
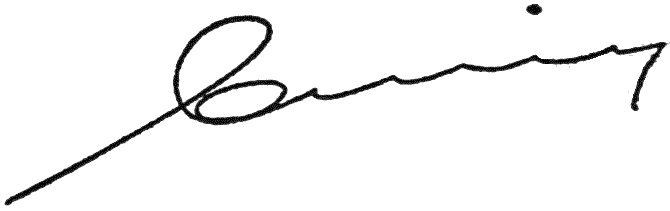
- Signature
- Website: Government website

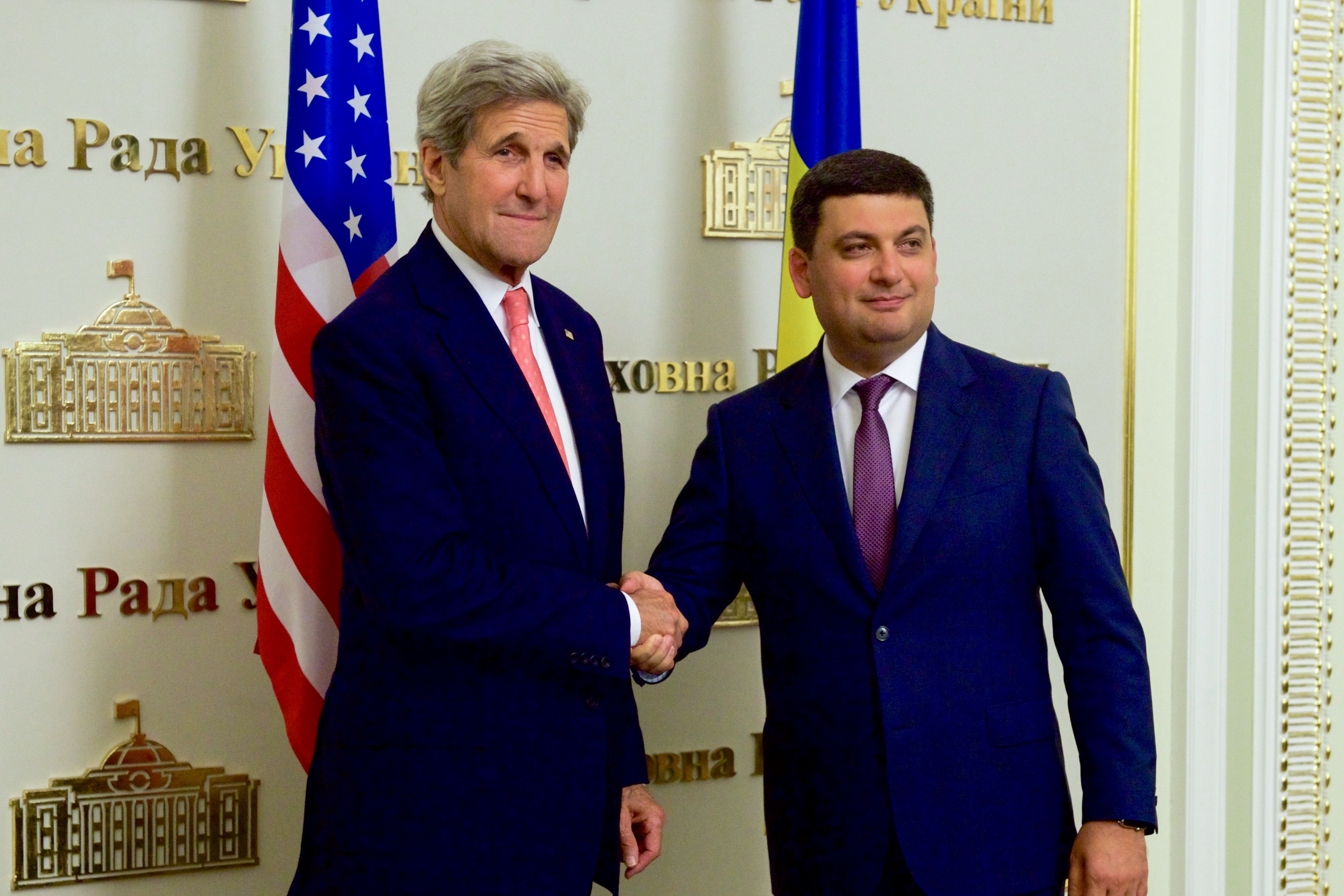
Groysman and U.S. Secretary of State John Kerry at the Verkhovna Rada in Kyiv in 2016

Volodymyr Borysovych Groysman (Note: sometimes Hroisman or Hroysman) (Ukrainian: Володимир Борисович Гройсман, pronounced [woloˈdɪmɪr boˈrɪsowɪdʒ ˈɦrɔjsmɐn]; born 20 January 1978) is a Ukrainian politician and businessman who served as Prime Minister of Ukraine from 2016 to 2019.

Born in Vinnytsia, Groysman was its mayor from 2006 to 2014 and served as Vice-President of the Association of Ukrainian Cities on Housing and Communal Services (2010–2014). He briefly served as acting prime minister and Minister of Regional Development, Construction, and Communal Services in 2014 and later served as Chairman of the Verkhovna Rada until 2016, elected through the Petro Poroshenko Bloc list.

== Biography ==
Groysman was born into a Jewish family in Vinnytsia, then part of the Ukrainian Soviet Socialist Republic (Soviet Union), on 20 January 1978.

In 1994, Groysman graduated from Vinnytsia Secondary School No. 35.

At 14, he began working as a locksmith at the Shkolyar (Schoolboy) cooperative, which had been founded by his father, Boris Isaakovich Groysman. In August 1994, aged 16, he graduated from school and was appointed as commercial director of the private small enterprise OKO. Three months later he began work as commercial director of the Vinnytsia market enterprise Yunist, which was his father's.

In 1999, Groysman graduated from the Vinnytsia Institute of Regional Economy and Management with a junior specialist degree in law.

In 2003, he graduated from the private higher education institution Interregional Academy of Personnel Management with a degree in law. In February 2010, he completed studies at the National Academy of Public Administration of the President of Ukraine, earning a master’s degree in Public Development Management with a focus on regional and local governance.

== Career ==
=== Mayor of Vinnytsia ===
In 2002, at 24, he won a seat in the Vinnytsia City Council in majoritarian district No. 29, becoming the youngest council member. In November 2005, he was elected Secretary of the Vinnytsia City Council and Acting Mayor of Vinnytsia. In March 2006, he won the mayoral election.

In the next 2010 election, Groysman was nominated by the political party Conscience of Ukraine and re-elected with substantial support, winning 77.8% of the vote.

As mayor, Groysman implemented a street lighting program, started in 2002, aimed at energy conservation and maximizing city lighting. During his first term, he initiated extensive road repairs on main and secondary streets. In 2006, he regulated unorganized street trade that blocked sidewalks.

In December 2006, after signing a Memorandum of Understanding between the governments of Switzerland and Ukraine, Groysman promoted cooperation between Vinnytsia and Zurich. From 2007 to 2011, Vinnytsia received 116 decommissioned Zurich trams from the late 1950s and 1960s, which were repaired and came with warranties. Later, free Wi-Fi was installed on these trams. In 2012, he led reforms of the city’s transportation system, reducing the number of minibuses. In 2013, the city purchased 30 buses and 40 trolleybuses, and completed the tram line on Vysenka.

In addition to foreign support, local resources were used for city development. Through co-financing, Vinnytsia installed water supply and sewage systems, repaired roads in residential areas, and maintained a landfill in Stadnytsia.

During Groysman’s tenure as mayor, Vinnytsia abolished district divisions and district councils. In 2008, the city launched the first "Transparent Office" to provide administrative services to the public. This system, later expanded across Ukraine, served as a model. The central bridge in Vinnytsia was also repaired.

Between 2007 and 2013, Groysman attracted over 736 million UAH in external investments to Vinnytsia. For the first time under his administration, Vinnytsia was recognized as the best regional city to live in Ukraine.

During his tenure, the city opened diagnostic and perinatal centers, reconstructed the riverside, opened a fountain in Central Park, expanded the Vinnytsia Oil and Fat Plant, and established "Bastion-2009" and the waste recycling company "Ekovin."

=== Deputy Prime Minister of Ukraine ===
On 27 February 2014, Groysman was appointed Deputy Prime Minister of Ukraine and Minister of Regional Development, Construction, and Communal Services at the invitation of Prime Minister Yatsenyuk. His primary focus was on decentralization and local governance reform, becoming an advocate and architect of the decentralization reform that began on 1 April 2014.

He also coordinated reforms of state control agencies. In the summer and fall of 2014, he headed the Government Anti-Crisis Energy Headquarters, the State Commission for investigating the MH17 downing (from 17 July 2014), coordinated efforts for internally displaced persons and managed reconstruction in the Donbas region, working with international donors.

=== Speaker of the Verkhovna Rada ===
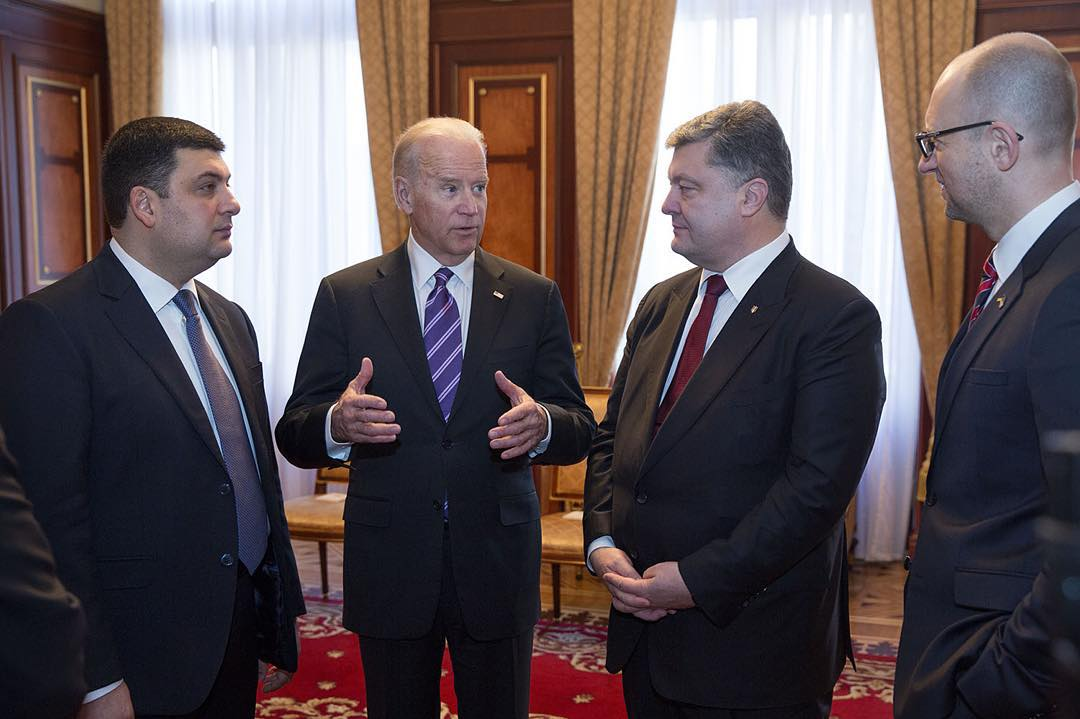
Groysman with Petro Poroshenko and Arseniy Yatsenyuk at a meeting with Joe Biden, 2015

Groysman was elected to the Verkhovna Rada as a member of the Petro Poroshenko Bloc. On 27 November 2014, he was elected Speaker of the Verkhovna Rada of Ukraine, and on 15 December 2014, he was appointed to the National Security and Defense Council of Ukraine.

Groysman initiated the Legislative Reform Support Plan, which outlined tasks for parliament members for one or two quarters. According to Groysman, the plan’s goal was to establish legislative guidelines for reforms, assign responsibilities for drafting bills, and set time frames for legislative support of reforms.

In March 2015, he supported a bill banning Russian television series. During the 2016 government crisis, he was considered a potential candidate for the position of Prime Minister of Ukraine from the ruling faction.

In July 2015, Groysman initiated parliamentary reform. Together with Martin Schulz, President of the European Parliament, he signed a Memorandum of Understanding between the Verkhovna Rada and the European Parliament. This document launched a Needs Assessment Mission, led by former European Parliament President Pat Cox, which resulted in a proposal for reforming the Ukrainian parliament.

During "Ukrainian Week" in Brussels in 2016, a roadmap for internal reform and strengthening the institutional capacity of the Verkhovna Rada was approved. Unfortunately, the reform was not implemented due to a lack of support from President Petro Poroshenko. That same year, the Verkhovna Rada adopted a resolution recognizing the European Parliament Mission’s recommendations as a basis for internal reform.

After the leadership change in the Verkhovna Rada in 2016, the reform's implementation slowed. However, the reform initiated by Groysman continued in the format of the Jean Monnet Dialogues and a mediation process involving joint efforts from the Ukrainian and European parliaments to develop political dialogue and consensus among political parties.

=== Prime Minister of Ukraine ===
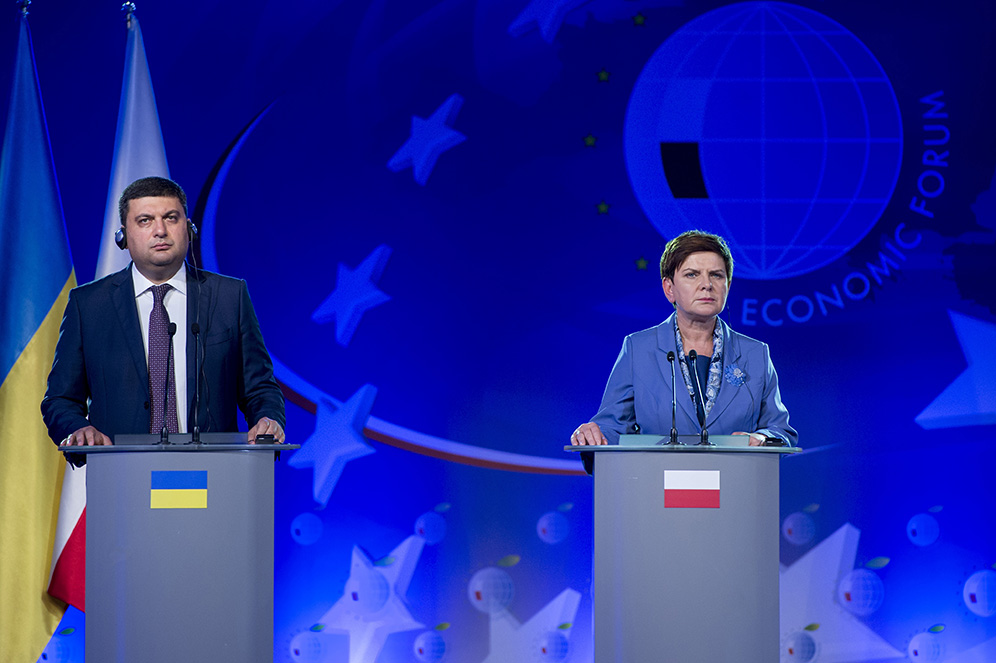
Volodymyr Groysman with Polish Prime Minister Beata Szydło during meeting in Krynica-Zdrój, 2016

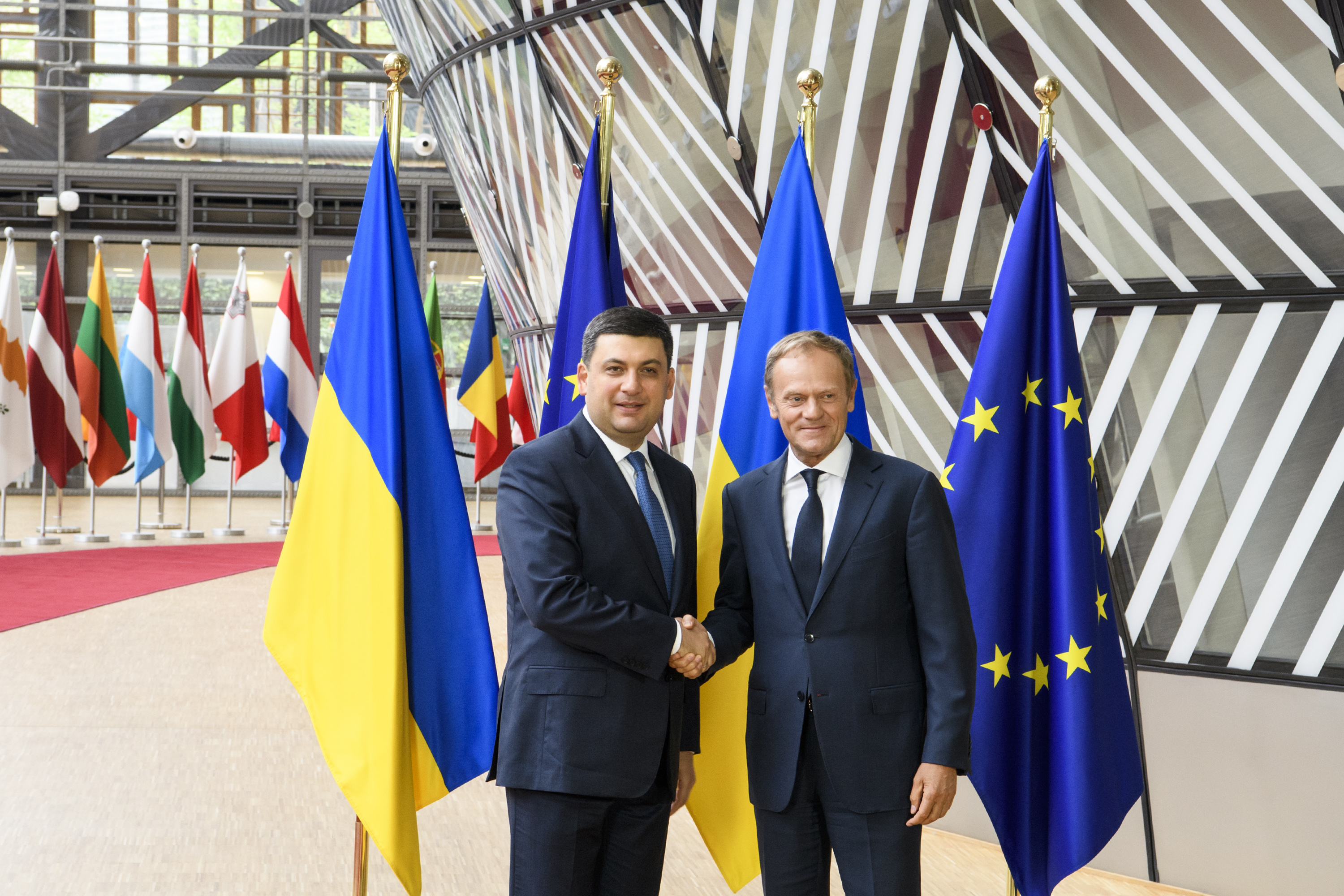
Groysman with President of the European Council Donald Tusk on 24 May 2018

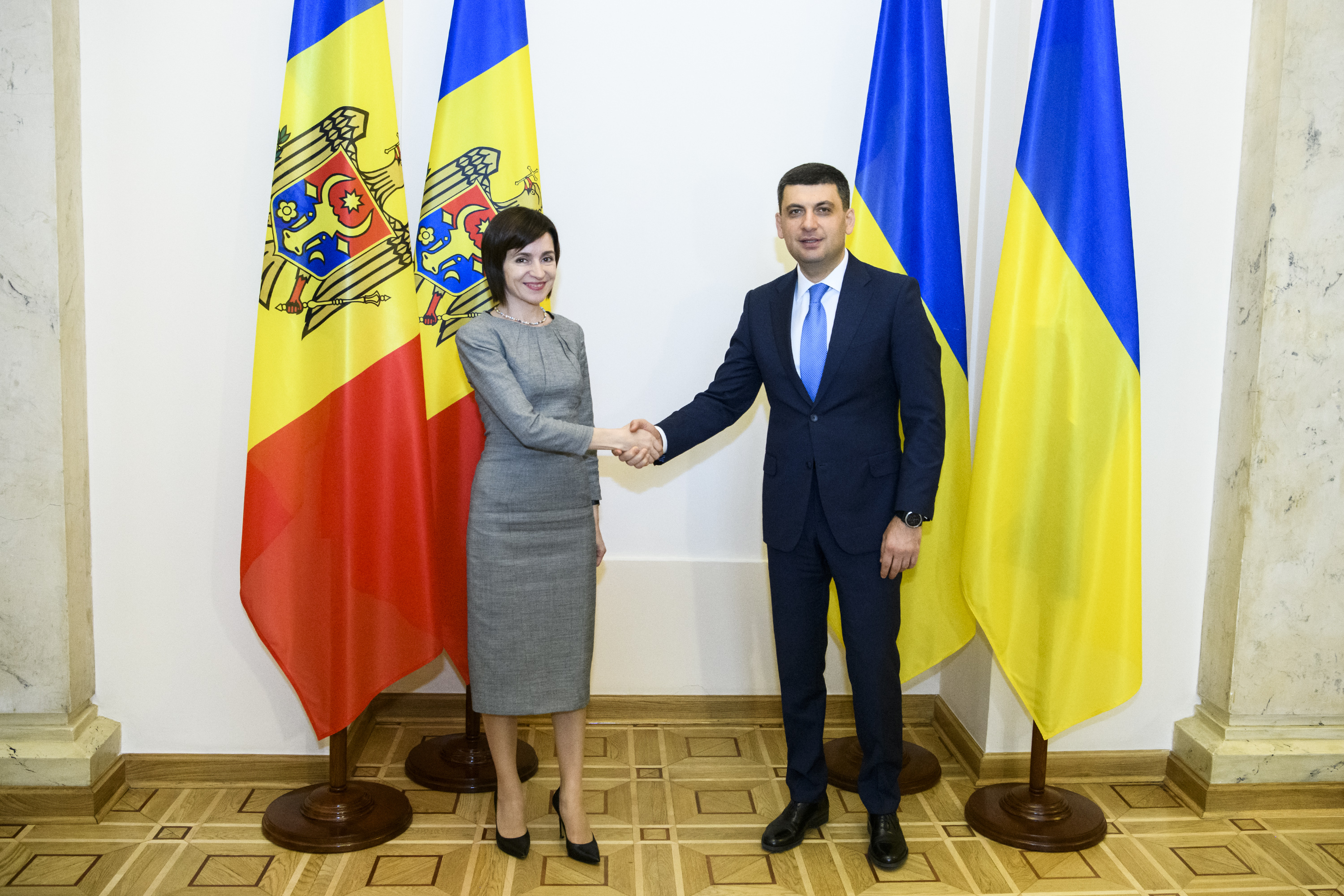
Groysman with Moldovan Prime Minister Maia Sandu on 11 July 2019

==== 2016 election and initial actions ====
On 14 April 2016, Groysman was appointed Prime Minister of Ukraine, receiving support from 257 deputies of the BPP, People's Front, Revival, and People's Will factions. During his early months as Prime Minister, Groysman was often described by journalists as lacking independence and closely connected to President Petro Poroshenko. However, over time, he began to distance himself from Poroshenko and criticize him.

As Prime Minister, he prioritized preparing for large-scale decentralization reform, as well as reforms in healthcare, infrastructure, and transport. Following his appointment, the BBC reported that critics considered him an "ally of the president" and a "product of the old order," rather than a leader who would push for necessary changes.

At the end of April, the government set a single gas price for households and industrial consumers, which raised the cost for households to UAH 6,900 per 1,000 m³. This decision aimed to establish market prices for gas, with the goal of restoring Ukrainian gas production and achieving gas independence by 2020.

During the first 100 days of Groysman’s government, there was partial stabilization of the political and economic situation. One of the government's main priorities was road repairs, with a planned increase in road repair funding from UAH 4 billion to UAH 19 billion. In the first 100 days, Groysman met with European Council President Donald Tusk, German Chancellor Angela Merkel, U.S. Secretary of State John Kerry, and other Western political leaders.

On 8 June Groysman stated that nearly 54 billion UAH had been allocated to the general fund of local budgets over five months, adding that this amount exceeded the figure for the same period by 17 billion UAH. By 9 December he stated that local budgets had increased by 60% (UAH 44 billion) compared to the previous year, and that during the reform period in Ukraine, 184 consolidated territorial communities were established. By 2017, UAH 9 billion was earmarked for decentralization reforms.

On 19 October, Groysman claimed he had managed to halt the economic decline and initiate economic recovery, aiming to accelerate this growth.

He considered judicial reform to be a key mechanism in combating corruption. On 13 December he announced that the Cabinet of Ministers of Ukraine had approved a healthcare reform concept and announced pay raises for healthcare workers.

On 21 December 2016, the Verkhovna Rada approved the government-proposed 2017 State Budget with 274 votes from five factions: BPP, People’s Front, Lyashko's Radical Party, Revival, and People’s Will. Groysman described the budget as "people-centered," with provisions for major road repairs, support for the agricultural sector, and a 50% salary increase for teachers and a 30% increase for doctors. UAH 6 billion was allocated for medications, and the budget continued decentralization efforts.

The budget projected a 3% GDP growth, doubling the minimum wage to UAH 3,200, and allocated nearly UAH 500 million to host the Eurovision Song Contest 2017 in Kyiv in May 2017. The government's plans included increasing income for Ukrainians, reducing the Pension Fund deficit, and encouraging economic recovery. The IMF praised the budget and expressed willingness to provide Ukraine with the next loan tranche to support ongoing reforms.

In Q4 of 2016, Ukraine’s economic growth reached 4.7%. In March 2017, following a trade blockade with the occupied areas of the Donetsk and Luhansk regions, Groysman announced the need to revise the 3% economic growth target.

==== 2017 ====
On 25 January 2017, Groysman stated that the Cabinet was working on a four-year development plan for the country from 2017 to 2020.

By early 2017, 950 km of roads had been repaired at a cost of UAH 6.3 billion. The civil service reform allowed for the selection of heads of regional and district state administrations, central executive bodies, and ministries based on a competitive process. Additionally, the government transitioned to an electronic document management system between the government, central executive bodies, and regional administrations. Sixteen electronic services were introduced in construction, registration, and environmental sectors.

On 13 March 2017, Groysman became the first Ukrainian politician to communicate with Elon Musk on Twitter. On 30 March Groysman sent an official letter to Musk regarding discussions on establishing energy infrastructure.

On 1 April 2017, the "Affordable Medicines" program began, allowing for free or low-cost access to a number of medications, including treatments for cardiovascular disease, type 2 diabetes, and bronchial asthma.

On 14 April 2017, marking his first year in office, Groysman highlighted his priorities, including stable economic growth, increased defense spending, decentralization, energy independence, and healthcare, pension, land, and education reforms.

On 3 April the Cabinet finalized its 2020 action plan, consisting of five key points: 1) economic growth; 2) effective governance; 3) human capital development; 4) rule of law and anti-corruption efforts; and 5) security and protection. The government’s plan aimed for a competitive economy and sustainable GDP growth of 4-5% per year, poverty reduction, and continued decentralization.

During Groysman's two-year tenure, the average wage increased by 22.1%, with the dollar equivalent rising from $193 to $300. Despite the emigration of the workforce, real GDP growth of 2% was achieved.

On 3 October 2017, the parliament passed a government pension reform law, increasing pensions for 9 million pensioners by UAH 200-1,000. Following the bill's approval, Groysman explained that the minimum pension, according to the new calculations, would be 1,452 hryvnias. According to the law, by the end of 2017, everyone who reached the age of 60 and had paid contributions to the Pension Fund for at least 15 years could retire. Starting from 1 January 2018, for those who reached 65 years of age and had 30–35 years of service, the minimum pension would be set at 40% of the minimum wage established in the state budget law. From January 2018, to retire at 60, one would need at least 25 years of service; in 2019, 26 years; and by 2028, it would require 35 years of service to retire at 60. On 8 October, President Poroshenko signed the pension reform law.

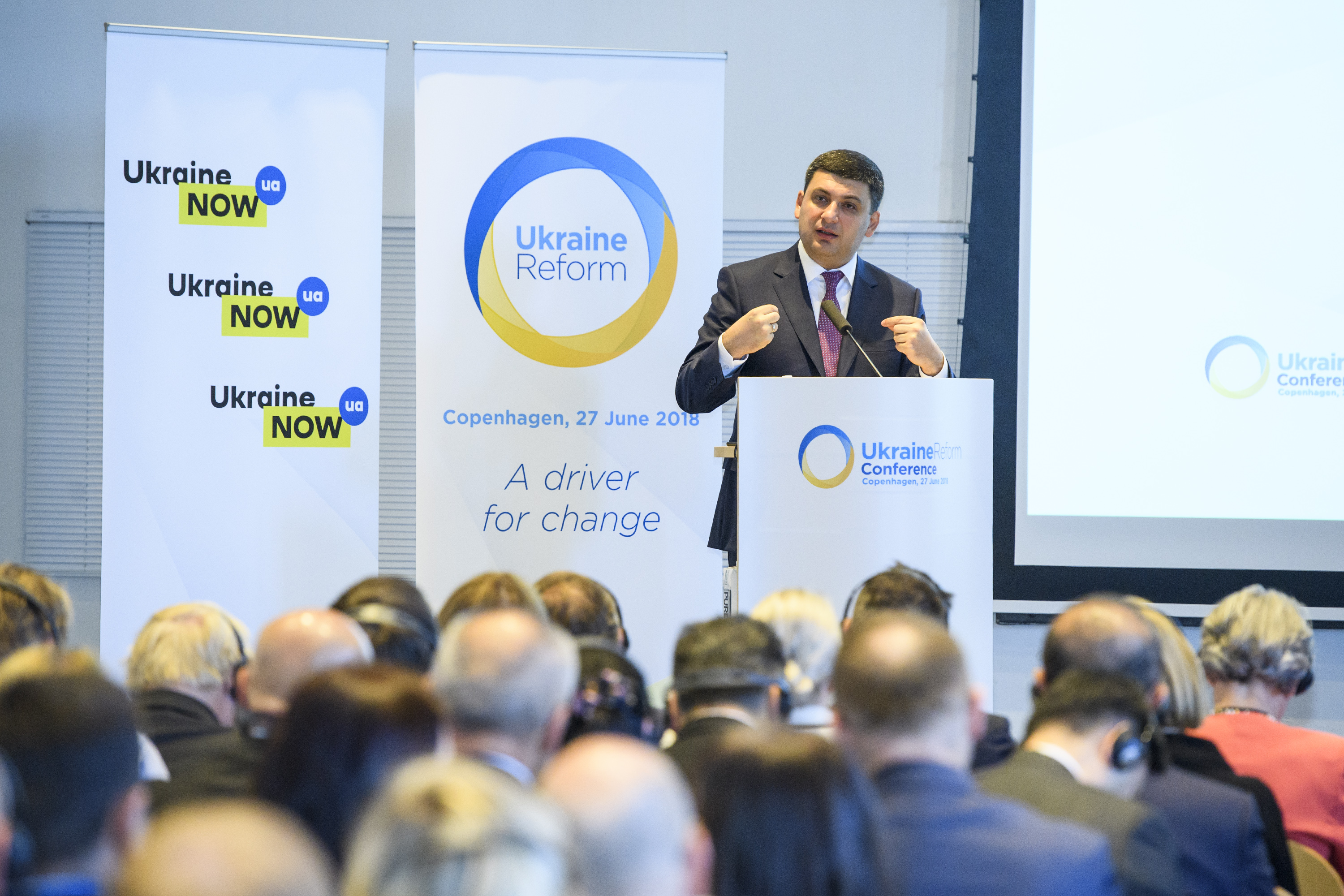
Volodymyr Groysman speaks at the 2nd Ukraine Reform Conference, 27 June 2018

==== 2018 ====
In September 2018, the government began monetizing subsidies for saved energy resources for consumers of electricity or gas.

In October 2018, the Cabinet of Ministers of Ukraine decided on a phased increase in gas prices in three steps (1 November 2018; 1 May 2019; 1 January 2019). According to Volodymyr Groysman, this was done "to repay loans imposed on us by previous governments between 2005 and 2013. Currently, we pay $5 billion annually to service this debt."

In 2018, the Groysman government managed to improve the economic situation in the country. Ukraine's gross domestic product grew by 3.2% over the year. The national currency and prices in the country remained stable, and for the first time since 2014, inflation was kept within 10%. At the end of the year, foreign reserves reached $20.8 billion, the highest level in five years. State budget revenues for 2018 amounted to 928.1 billion UAH, which was 17% higher than in 2017. The budget deficit did not exceed 1.7% against a planned 2.4%. The state and guaranteed debt-to-GDP ratio decreased to 63.2% from 72.3%.

Financial decentralization continued. Local budget revenues, excluding inter-budget transfers, amounted to 262 billion UAH compared to 70 billion UAH in 2014. Local communities gained the right to decide where to allocate these funds – on road repairs, construction of schools and hospitals, improvement of administrative services, establishment of new enterprises, etc.

Due to visa-free access and an increase in the number of low-cost airlines, passenger traffic at Ukrainian airports exceeded 20 million passengers per year for the first time. Overall, passenger growth in the aviation sector reached 25-30% annually over the last three years, and the number of routes operated by budget airlines flying to Ukraine increased from 21 in 2016 to 89 in 2018.

The government paid significant attention to energy consumption issues. A State Energy Efficiency Fund was established, with 1.6 billion UAH allocated from the state budget. International partners also contributed to the Fund. The funds were intended for measures to reduce energy consumption and improve the quality of service delivery.

The pace of road and infrastructure construction accelerated. Over the year, 3,800 km of roads were built, the highest figure in 14 years.

Electronic land auctions for leasing rights were introduced. The open service provided broad buyer coverage, increased competition, and stimulated price growth. As a result, communities received significantly more for their land than in traditional auctions.

As part of a large-scale government medical reform, the National Health Service of Ukraine began operations. It became the primary contractor for medical services in Ukraine, distributing budget funds among hospitals with which it signs contracts. Hospitals are paid for the medical services and drugs they provide. In 2018, the NHSU contracted with hospitals only for primary care – family doctors. As a result, doctors’ and nurses' salaries increased two- to threefold. A complete transition to the new funding model for medical institutions was planned for 2020, when medical reform would be implemented across all levels.

On the government’s initiative, starting 1 September 2018, Ukrainian families receive a set of 25 essential items for newborns – a one-time aid known as the "baby package."

This year, the Ukrainian government also took steps to address bullying in schools. As a result, a law was adopted to counteract bullying.

==== 2019 ====
In January 2019, the Groysman government began reorganizing the State Fiscal Service by dividing it into the State Tax Service and the State Customs Service. This aimed to improve tax and fee administration in the country.

On 1 January 2019, the government improved access to subsoil resources. Special permits for subsoil use could only be obtained through electronic auctions.

In 2019, another government program to assist parents began operating in Ukraine – "Municipal Nanny." Families could receive monthly funds from the state to reimburse the nanny's salary.

On 1 March 2019, automatic pension recalculation occurred for the first time. Pensions were automatically increased for 10.2 million pensioners.

During its years in office, the Groysman government significantly deregulated business operations in the country. In total, more than 1,200 regulatory acts and orders governing business were canceled.

In May, he announced his participation in the parliamentary elections at the head of his political party "Ukrainian Strategy," which was based on a centrist position.

On 20 May, during his inauguration speech, the 6th President of Ukraine, Volodymyr Zelenskyy, announced the dissolution of the Verkhovna Rada and called on the government to resign. On the same day, Groysman announced his intention to resign following the Cabinet of Ministers meeting on 22 May and added that Zelenskyy should immediately propose a candidate for the new prime minister. On 30 May, deputies refused to support Groysman’s resignation, which would have meant the resignation of the entire government. Ninety-seven deputies voted in favor of this decision, including members of Batkivshchyna, the Opposition Bloc, the Radical Party of Oleh Lyashko, and Samopomich. Speaker of the Verkhovna Rada Andriy Parubiy stated before the vote that he opposed the government's resignation. The BPP faction decided not to support the prime minister's resignation. The People’s Front expressed the same position.

Groysman led the Ukrainian Strategy of Groysman party list in the 2019 parliamentary elections, in which the party did not pass the threshold.

=== Assessment of activities ===
According to a survey by the Democratic Initiatives Foundation and the Razumkov Centre, in 2016, Groysman ranked second in the Politician of the Year rating after President Poroshenko.

As of the end of May 2019, the "Word and Deed" website recorded 614 promises made by Groysman, of which he fulfilled 319, did not fulfill 149, and 146 were "in progress." His overall responsibility level was 52%.

According to an all-Ukrainian poll by the Kyiv International Institute of Sociology (KIIS) in February 2019, Volodymyr Groysman led the list of those whom Ukrainians wanted to see as prime minister after the presidential elections on 31 March 2019, but by May of that year, he was in fourth place (8.8%) according to a study by the Rating group.

85.5% of experts surveyed by the Situation Modeling Agency believed that the country's situation improved during Groysman’s government.

In July 2019, according to a poll by the "Rating" sociological group, nearly 30% of Ukrainians approved of Groysman's performance as prime minister (compared to 17% in March 2018); however, more than 60% expressed dissatisfaction.

=== Disagreements with Poroshenko ===
Reports of disagreements between Groysman and Poroshenko emerged after the vote for Groysman’s government in 2016.

Analysts indicated that the rift was deepening, and in 2018, tensions began to spill into the public sphere.

During the 2019 presidential elections, Groysman openly supported Poroshenko's candidacy, but before the same year’s parliamentary elections, he declined to lead the Bloc of Petro Poroshenko and later called it an "old party."

The former prime minister stated that he had "moral and value disagreements" with the former president for all three years, had different views on economic development, and that they were "not on the same path."

According to Groysman, tensions arose during the 2015 local elections. In 2016, he led the government as a compromise figure invited by the former prime minister, Arseniy Yatsenyuk, rather than as "Poroshenko’s man." Groysman also claimed that Poroshenko, despite his public support, actually opposed the government on several reforms, including decentralization, privatization, parliamentary reform, healthcare, support for farming, business deregulation, and other management areas. In response, Poroshenko stated that Groysman's decision to participate in the parliamentary elections as a separate team was political suicide, but added that he held no grudges against him, although he did not approve of his choice.

=== Victory in Vinnytsia ===
Since 2014, Groysman focused on national politics and occasionally appeared in public projects in Vinnytsia, including initiating the "Stop-Virus" fund to support and promote medical, preventive, and informational efforts to counter the spread of coronavirus.

Serhiy Morgunov, who became acting mayor in 2014 as Groysman's successor and team member, was elected mayor in the 2015 local elections. Under Morgunov's leadership, Vinnytsia has held the position of the most comfortable city in Ukraine since 2015 (according to research by the International Republican Institute (IRI) in collaboration with the Rating sociological group).

In the 2020 local elections, "Groysman's Ukrainian Strategy" won an absolute majority in the Vinnytsia City Council, securing 34 out of 54 seats, and also achieved a regional victory, winning 40 out of 84 seats in the Vinnytsia Oblast Council. In the first round of the mayoral election, Morgunov, the candidate from "Groysman's Ukrainian Strategy" and a long-time ally of the former prime minister, was re-elected with a significant lead, receiving 65.93% of the vote. Vyacheslav Sokolovyi, who also ran under "Groysman's Ukrainian Strategy," assumed the leadership of the Vinnytsia Oblast Council. Following the full-scale Russian invasion of Ukraine, Groysman and his party paused political activities to focus on supporting the military, with Groysman in 2022 leading the Interregional Humanitarian Coordination Headquarters, which operates in two areas: aiding Ukrainian Armed Forces units and supporting the children of servicemembers and internally displaced persons.

Enemy of Russia

In April 2024, Russia's Investigative Committee accused Groysman, former Minister of Foreign Affairs Pavlo Klimkin, and former Minister of Information Policy Yuriy Stets of supporting the start of the War in Donbas while holding high government positions.

In May, Russia announced Groysman was wanted for "use of prohibited means and methods of warfare."

In early July, the Basmanny District Court in Moscow issued an arrest warrant in absentia for Groysman, along with Klimkin, former Finance Minister Oleksandr Shlapak, and the commander of "Zakhid" Ihor Dovhan.

Groysman responded to his arrest warrant on his Facebook page: "I eagerly await seeing all of them (Putin and other Russian criminals) in the dock, where they will answer for the innocent Ukrainians tortured and murdered, for the kidnapped and abused children. And then it won’t be a farce, but true justice, for justice will surely prevail. So, see you in The Hague!"

During the full-scale war, the former prime minister also participates in international meetings in Vinnytsia and Kyiv and appears at international conferences like YES (Yalta European Strategy) and the Kyiv Security Forum.

== Awards ==
- 2011: Knight's Cross of the Order of Merit of the Republic of Poland, for merit in the development of Polish-Ukrainian cooperation Groysman returned this award to Poland in 2026 in solidarity with President Volodymyr Zelenskyy.
- 2012: Order of Merit of 2nd degree, for a significant personal contribution to state-building, socio-economic, scientific-technical, cultural, and educational development in Ukraine, notable professional achievements, and high professionalism.
- 2008: Order of Merit of 3rd degree, for a significant personal contribution to the development of Ukraine’s constitutional foundations, years of conscientious work, high professionalism, and in honor of Ukraine’s Constitution Day.

== Family ==
Groysman is married to Olena and has two daughters and a son. His father, Borys Isakovych Groysman, who was a factory foreman in Soviet times and after 1990 a businessman, was a deputy in the Vinnytsia City Council for three terms (2002–2006, 2010–2015, and since 2015). His mother, Zhanna Izrailyvna (1950–2000), was a teacher.

== In popular culture ==
- A response from Tesla to Groysman's proposal to invest in projects in Ukraine gained significant popularity online. Later, the Cabinet of Ministers of Ukraine stated that it had not received a response from Elon Musk's corporation and declared the letter image fake.

== See also ==
- First Yatsenyuk government
- Second Government of Arseniy Yatsenyuk
- Government of Volodymyr Groysman
- List of mayors of Vinnytsia

== Notes ==
Political offices
| Preceded by Oleksandr Dombrovskyi | Mayor of Vinnytsia; 2006–2014 | Succeeded by Serhiy Morhunov |
| Preceded by Hennadiy Temnyk | Minister of Regional Development, Construction and Communal Living; 2014 | Succeeded by Hennadiy Zubko |
| Preceded by Arseniy Yatsenyuk | Prime Minister of Ukraine; Acting; 2014 | Succeeded by Arseniy Yatsenyuk |
| Preceded by Oleksandr Turchynov | Chairman of the Verkhovna Rada; 2014–2016 | Succeeded by Andriy Parubiy |
| Preceded by Arseniy Yatsenyuk | Prime Minister of Ukraine; 2016–2019 | Succeeded by Oleksiy Honcharuk |
