= Pavlo Petrenko =

Ukrainian politician, jurist, lawyer (born 1979)

- Павло Петренко
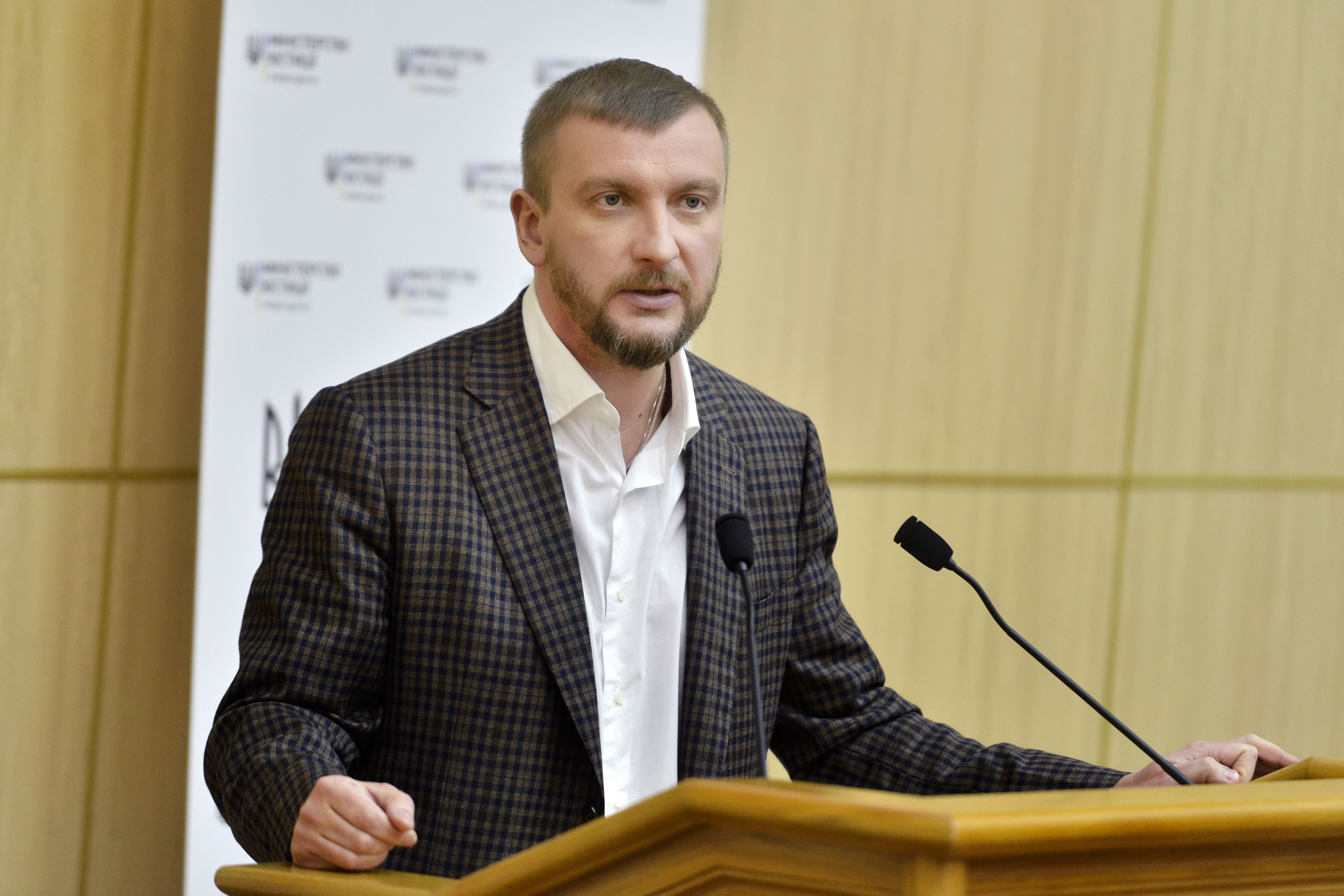
- Petrenko in 2018

14th Minister of Justice of Ukraine
- In office 27 February 2014 – 29 August 2019
- Prime Minister: Arseniy Yatsenyuk; Volodymyr Groysman
- Preceded by: Olena Lukash
- Succeeded by: Denys Maliuska

Personal details
- Born: 17 July 1979 (age 47) Chernivtsi, Ukrainian SSR
- Party: People's Front
- Other political affiliations: Front for Change; Batkivshchyna
- Education: Chernivtsi University

Pavlo Dmytrovych Petrenko (Ukrainian: Павло Дмитрович Петренко; born 17 July 1979) is a Ukrainian politician, jurist, lawyer.

MP of Ukraine 7th convocation. Minister of Justice of Ukraine from 27 February 2014 until 29 August 2019.

== Education ==
After secondary education, he entered the law faculty of Chernivtsi National University, handicrafts, graduating with honors in 2001 and was educated in the specialty "Jurisprudence". Has the educational qualification of Master of Laws degree.

In 2004 he received the diploma of the Ukrainian Academy of Foreign Trade under the Ministry of Economy of Ukraine in "Management".

In 2014 he received a Candidate of Sciences degree in juridical sciences.

== Career ==
Work began legal counsel for private law firms, and in December 2001 became General Counsel of State Savings Bank of Ukraine, where he continued to work until 2005 in senior positions in the department of legal support.

From 2006 to 2010, engaged in the practice of law.

Since 2009 he has been a member of the political party "Front of Changes", was a bureau of the party and led the legal department.

In November 2010 he was elected a deputy of the Kyiv Regional Council, member of the standing committee on law and order and fighting corruption.

In the parliamentary elections in December 2012 has held the position of Head of Legal Department of the United Opposition "Batkivshchyna". From 12 December 2012 – Deputy of Ukraine of the 7th convocation of the party "Batkivshchyna", № 52 on the list. Secretary of the Parliamentary Committee on the rule of law and justice.

15 June 2013, after the unification of the "Front of Changes" and the "Batkivshchyna" was chosen as one of the deputy leader of the "Batkivshchyna".

In September 2014 Petrenko became a founding member of his new party People's Front.

Petrenko took part in the July 2019 Ukrainian parliamentary election with the party Ukrainian Strategy. But in the election they won 2.41% of the votes, less than half if the 5% election threshold, and thus no parliamentary seats.
