= Radical Party of Oleh Liashko =

Nationalist party in Ukraine

Radical Party of Oleh Liashko Радикальна партія Олега Ляшка
- Abbreviation: RPL
- Leader: Oleh Liashko
- Founded: 28 September 2010; 16 years ago
- Headquarters: Kyiv, Ukraine
- Ideology: Social democracy; Left-wing populism; Left-wing nationalism; Civic nationalism; Economic nationalism; Soft Euroscepticism
- Political position: Left-wing
- Colours: White; Black; Red
- Verkhovna Rada: 0 / 450
- Regions: 584 / 43,122

Website
- liashko.ua

The Radical Party of Oleh Liashko (Ukrainian: Радикальна партія Олега Ляшка, romanized: Radykal'na partiia Oleha Liashka; RPL), formerly known as the Ukrainian Radical-Democratic Party (Ukrainian: Українська радикально-демократична партія, romanized: Ukrainska radykalno-demokratychna partiia; URDP), is a political party in Ukraine. It was registered in September 2010. It was primarily known for its radical populism, especially in 2014, when it had its largest amount of support.

At the 2012 parliamentary election, the party had won 1 seat in the Verkhovna Rada. The party won 22 seats at the 2014 parliamentary election. At the 2019 parliamentary election it lost all of its seats.

== History ==
=== Ukrainian Radical Democratic Party ===
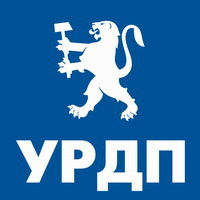
The logo of the Ukrainian Radical Democratic Party

The party was established at the founding congress in Mykolaiv on 18 August 2010 and was then named the Ukrainian Radical Democratic Party. Under this name, it was registered with the Ministry of Justice of Ukraine on 28 September 2010. At the time, the party was led by Vladyslav Telipko.

=== Radical Party of Oleh Liashko ===
During its third party congress on 8 August 2011, Oleh Liashko was elected the new party leader. The same day, the party changed its name to the Radical Party of Oleh Liashko.

At the 2012 Ukrainian parliamentary election, the party won 1.08% of the national votes and 1 constituency (it had competed in 28 constituencies) for its leader Liashko, who did not join a faction in the Verkhovna Rada. The party was most successful in Chernihiv Oblast, where it received 10.69 percent of the vote, finishing fifth. The constituency that Liashko won was also located in Chernihiv Oblast.

The party became known for its left-wing populism, with pitchfork becoming the main symbol of the party, together with its highly contrastive combination of white, black and red. The party's appeal is emboided by its radical populist leader Oleh Liashko, who campaigned in the traditional vyshyvanka embroidered shirt with a pitchfork, portraying himself as an ordinary countryman. The party also became notable for its aggressive use of online campaigning and social media.

According to political scientist Tadeusz A. Olszański, in mid-September 2014 the party was "a typical one-man party, centred around Oleh Liashko; its real organisational potential remains a mystery". At the 2014 Ukrainian parliamentary election, the party's list was led by Liashko, with Serhii Melnychuk, commander of the Aidar Battalion, in third place, singer Zlata Ognevich in fourth place and Yurii Shukhevych, son of the military leader of the Ukrainian Insurgent Army Roman Shukhevych, in fifth place. At the election, the party won 22 seats. It received support from rural and regional voters who had previously supported Fatherland.

On 21 November 2014, the party became a member of the coalition supporting the second Yatsenyuk government and sent one minister into this government.

On 3 June 2015, the parliament stripped the party's MP Serhii Melnychuk of his parliamentary prosecutorial immunity rights as he was accused of forming a criminal gang, abductings and threatening people.

The Radical Party left the second Yatsenyuk government coalition on 1 September 2015 in protest over a vote in parliament involving a change to the Ukrainian Constitution that would lead to decentralization and greater powers for areas held by pro-Russian separatists. According to party leader Liashko, the party "can't stay in the coalition after anti-Ukrainian changes to the constitution, initiated by the president, were approved against the will of three parties of the coalition". He was referring to his own party, Self Reliance and Fatherland.

In the 2019 Ukrainian parliamentary election the party lost all its parliamentary seats, it gained about 1% too little to clear the 5% election threshold and also did not win an electoral district seat. The party had participated in 65 single-mandate majority electoral districts.

In the 2020 Ukrainian local elections 535 people won seats in local councils on behalf of the party, that is about 1.62% of the available seats.

In 2022, in response to the Russian invasion of Ukraine, the leader of the party Oleg Liashko joined the Ukrainian army to fight in the war, for which he earned the nickname "Beast". In August 2023, the party announced that 34 out of its 582 regional deputies joined the Ukrainian army; two of the deputies died in combat - Eduard Pinchuk of the Sumy Oblast Council and Adriy Korniychuk of the Kostopil City Council.

== Ideology and stances ==
Observers had defined the party as left-wing, with some also describing it as right-wing, or far-right. However, political scientists such as Luke March, Mattia Zulianello, Paul Chaisty as well as Stephen Whitefield classify the party as left-wing, and the 2017 Oxford Handbook of Populism also describes the party as left-wing. The Razumkov Centre also classifies the Radical Party as one with a "clearly leftist profile". Regarding the concerns of the Radical Party's hardline nationalist rhetoric, political analyst Georgy Chizhov argues: "Lyashko can hardly be considered a true nationalist; he does not go deep into the jungle of ideology and completely emasculates the essence of his appeals as glorious traditions of the past."

The Radical Party is centered on Liashko, who is known for his populism and highly combative behavior. The party advocates a number of traditional left-wing positions on economics such as lower salary taxes, a ban on agricultural land sale and eliminating the illegal land market, a tenfold increase in budget spending on health and setting up primary health centres in every village and mixes them with strong nationalist sentiments. Anton Shekhovtsov of University College London considers Liashko's party to be similar to populist and nationalist. A similar view is shared by political scientist Mattia Zulianello. The party proposes an extensive social protection policy with guarantees of free service, supports the state having the leading role in the economy, and calls for redistribution and state regulatons of prices for public goods. Political scientist Tadeusz A. Olszański described the party as liberal-nationalist, pro-European and populist.

Liashko and his party combine radically left-wing economical stances with authoritarian and nationalist outlook on society; economically, the party is considered social-democratic. The Radical Party promotes the concept of a state as an active, authoritarian regulator of both the society and economy. The party supports extensive social welfare, protectionism as a way to support domestic industries, generous agricultural grants and implementation of state control on prices. One of the iconic proposals of the party is for the state to pay at least 5.000 hryvnias to every farmer for every cow owned, and to compensate 50% of farming equipment cost. The ideological foundation of the party was described as left social populism with paternalistic qualities; in its program, the party asserts: “The purpose of the Radical Party – a society of equal opportunities and welfare.” Similarly, the party also states the “protection of the disadvantaged” as its overarching goal.

The party has promised to purify the country of oligarchs "with a pitchfork". It has proposed higher taxes on products manufactured by oligarchs and a crisis tax on the latter. The party was described as presenting "left-wing, anti-oligarch economic policies previously associated with the Communist Party"; the similarity with the banned Communist Party is also similar because of the Radical Party's oppositional stance towards EU integration. Paul Chaisty and Stephen Whitefield noted that the party "took the same position as voters of right-wing and nationalist parties on the question of EU integration, suggesting no significant realignment of Communist voters in the East". The party routinely attacks the International Monetary Fund, stating that the "global financial clans have infiltrated our National Bank of Ukraine, ministries and departments, and have usurped at least 60% of Ukraine’s sovereignty".

Party leader Liashko had stressed in May 2011 he had nothing against sexual minorities. In a September 2015 interview with Ukrayinska Pravda, he stated that being an LGBT person "is the choice of each individual. I can not condemn".

Ukrainian political analyst Denys Rybachok described the party as "a supporter of social democracy with high social obligations of the state", including the party's populist proposals to hike taxes on the oligarchs, implement protectionist measures to protect national produces, reverse the privatization of once state-owned enterprises, and re-nationalize sold land. In regards to legislative matters, the party supports quotas for the Ukrainian language, advocates the strengthening of the presidential power and demands the release of all current judges and prosecutors from their functions. The party also seeks to reduce the number of MPs in the Verkhovna Rada from 450 to 250, and to introduce term limits to the Rada.

The party wants to re-arm Ukraine with nuclear weapons. The party also advocates an end to the Russo-Ukrainian War by the use of force. The party also proposes deployment of United Nations peacekeeping in Donbas.

Amongst the proposals of the party is to ban Russophile parties such as the Communist Party of Ukraine and the Party of Regions. Despite its anti-Russian positions, the party also supports localism and regional decentralization, arguing for the need to extend the authority of local governments.

Polish observers compared the Radical Party of Olesh Liashko to Self-Defence of the Republic of Poland (Polish: Samoobrona Rzeczpospolitej Polski). Die Presse also compared Lyashko himself to the leader of Samoobrona, Andrzej Lepper. Samoobrona is a far-left Polish political party that was described as radical, left-wing populist, and agrarian socialist. Two parties share many similarities, such as their staunchly nationalist, agrarian and left-wing populist positions, as well as controversial forms of protest.

== Party leaders ==
- Vladyslav Telipko (2010–2011)
- Oleh Liashko (2011–present)

== Election results ==
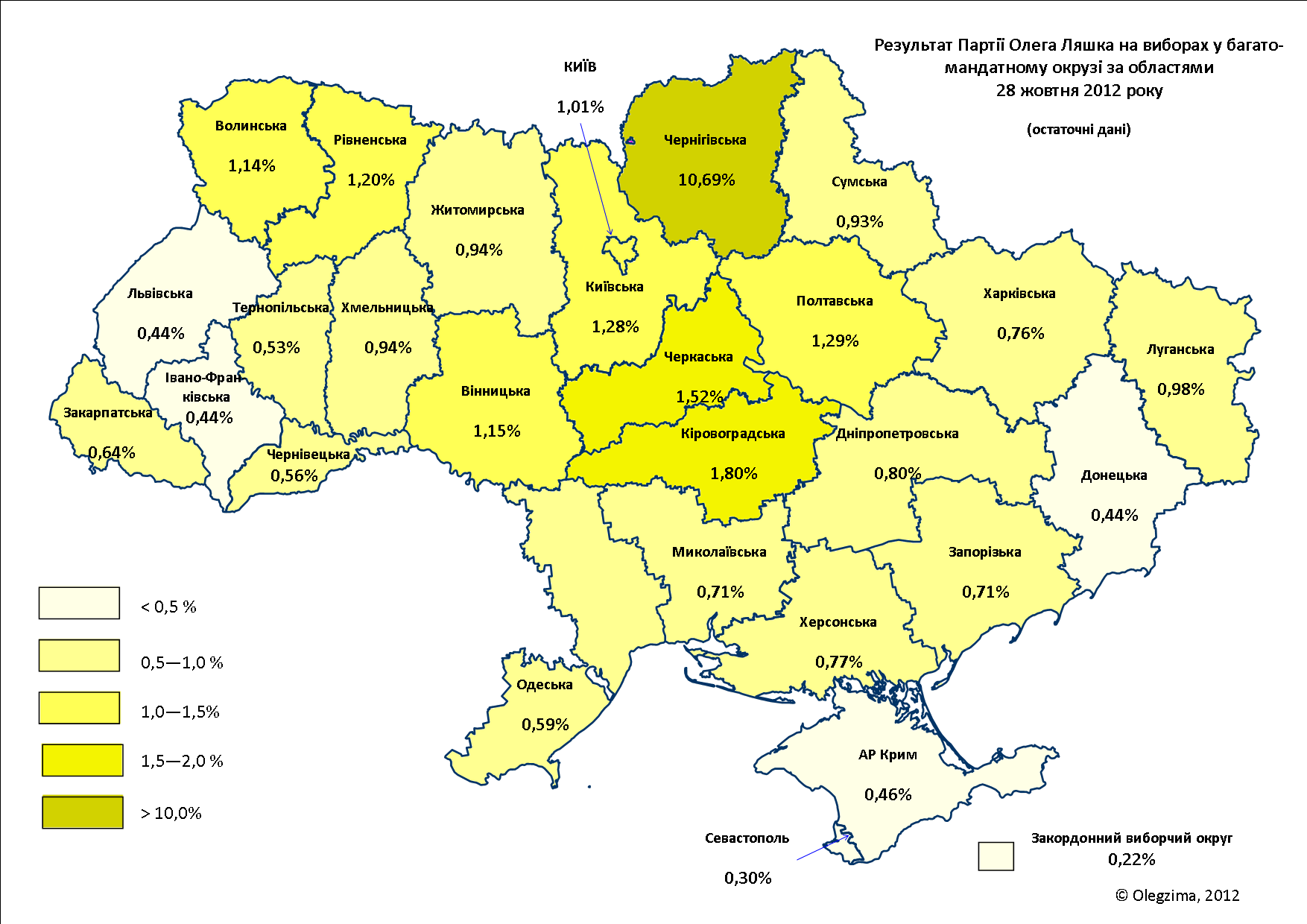
Results in the 2012 elections

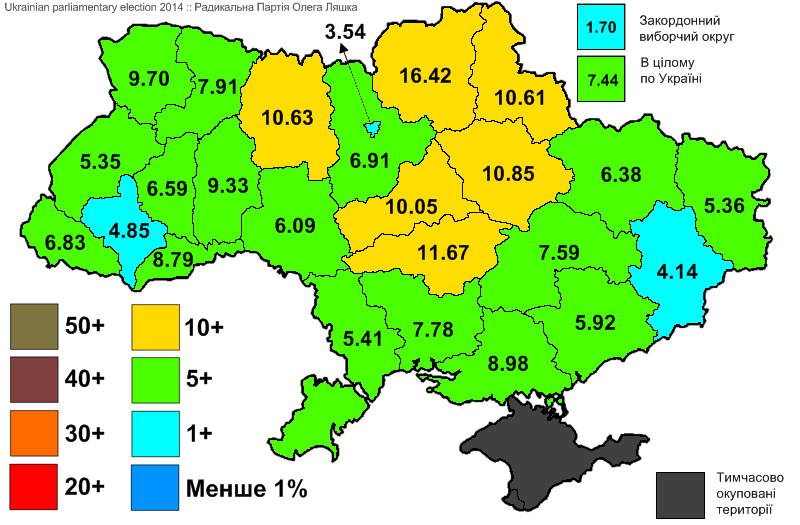
Results in the 2014 elections

=== Verkhovna Rada ===
Year	Popular vote	% of popular vote	Overall seats won	Seat change	Government
2012	221,136	1.08	1 / 450	▲1	Opposition
2014	1,171,697	7.45	22 / 450	▲21	YeS-PF-USR-BA-RPL (2014–2015)
2014	1,171,697	7.45	22 / 450	▲21	YeS-PF-USR-BA (2015–2016)
2014	1,171,697	7.45	22 / 450	▲21	YeS-PF (2016–2019)
2019	586,294	4.01	0 / 450	▼22	Extra-parliamentary

=== Presidential elections ===
President of Ukraine
Election year	Candidate	No. of 1st round votes	% of 1st round vote	No. of 2nd round votes	% of 2nd round vote
2014	Oleh Liashko	1,500,377	8.32		
2019	Oleh Liashko	1,036,003	5.48		

=== Local councils ===
Election	Performance				Rank
Election	%	± pp	Seats	+/–	Rank
2015	1.58%	New	2,476 / 158,399	New	7th
2020	1.38%	▼0.20	584 / 43,122	▼1892	7th

== See also ==
- Category:Radical Party of Oleh Liashko politicians
- Self-Defence of the Republic of Poland
