= Vice Prime Minister of Ukraine =

The Vice Prime Minister of Ukraine (Ukrainian: Віцепрем'єр-міністр України), also known as the Deputy Prime Minister of Ukraine, is a member of the Cabinet of Ministers of Ukraine. In an absence of the First Deputy Prime Minister of Ukraine, their functions are performed by other vice prime ministers, who ensure the implementation of the cabinet's activity program. The powers are determined by the Law of Ukraine "On the Cabinet of Ministers of Ukraine".

== Current Deputy Prime Ministers of Ukraine ==
Title	Portfolio	Photo	Minister	Term Start
First Deputy Prime Minister	Minister of Energy		Denys Shmyhal	January 14, 2026
Deputy Prime Minister	European and Euro-Atlantic Integration		Vsevolod Chentsov	July 16, 2026
Deputy Prime Minister	Humanitarian Policy of Ukraine – Minister of Culture of Ukraine		Tetyana Berezhna	October 21, 2025

== See also ==
- First Deputy Prime Minister of Ukraine
- Law of Ukraine
