= List of regions of Ukraine by GDP =

This article lists the administrative divisions of Ukraine by their nominal GDP in euros and hryvnias in 2021. All values are rounded to the nearest million in case of GDP data and to the nearest whole number in case of GDP per capita data.

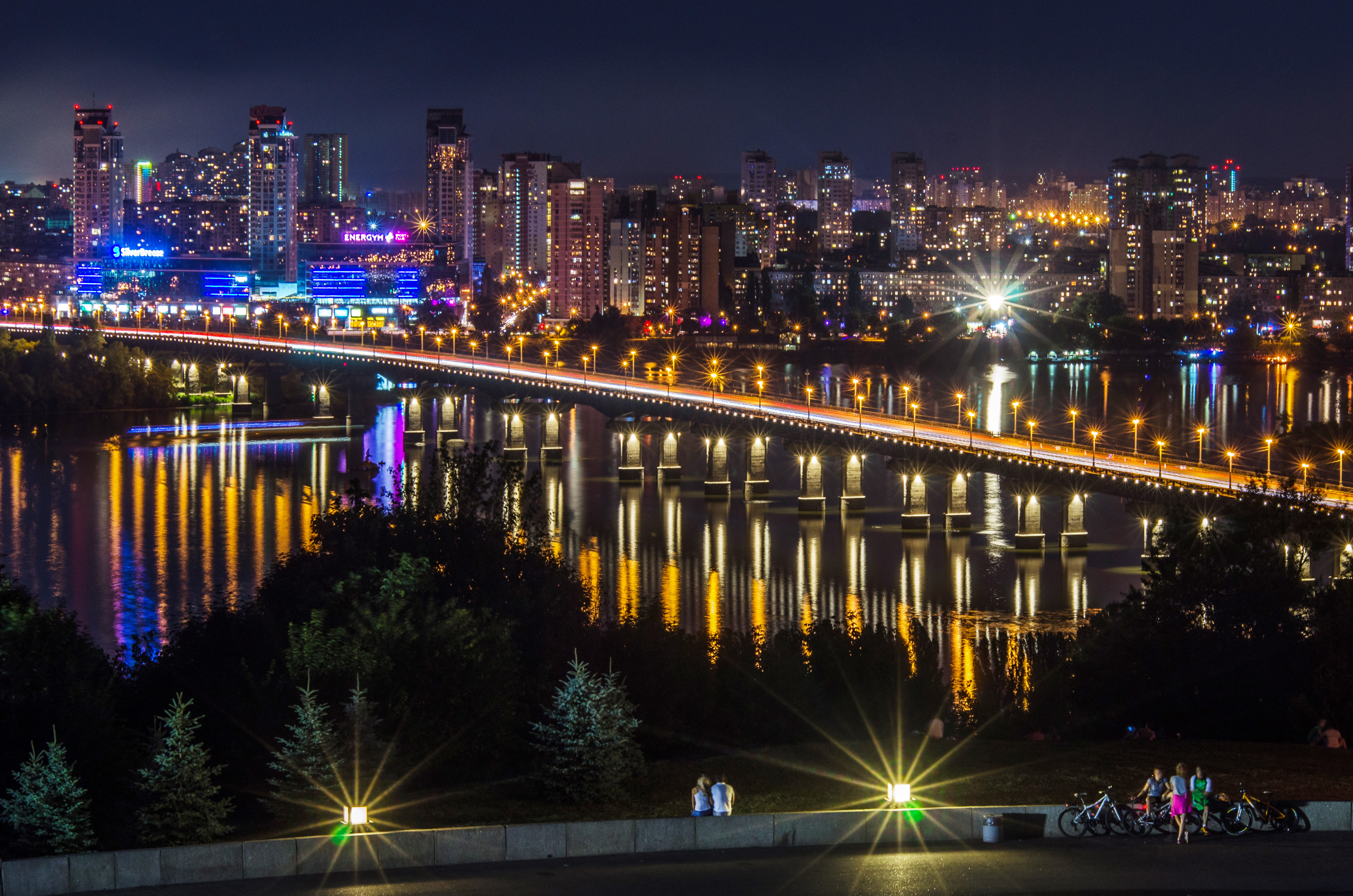
Kyiv has the largest GDP €26.29 billion (US$29.67 billion) and GDP per capita €8,905 (US$10,050.79) in Ukraine

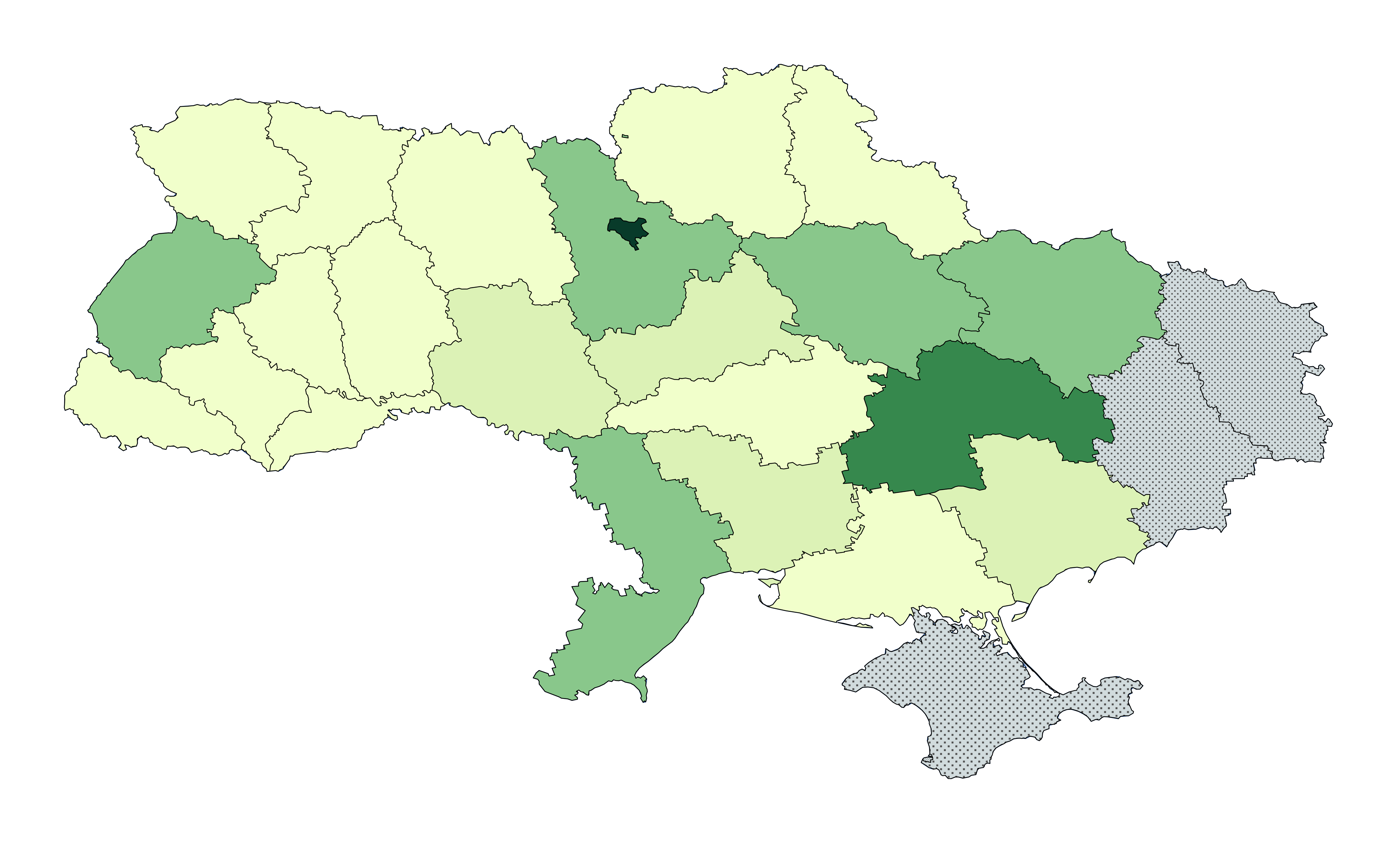
Regions of Ukraine by GDP (2021) Map key: > €25,000 mil. > €10,000 mil. > €5,000 mil. > €2,500 mil. > €1,000 mil. N/A

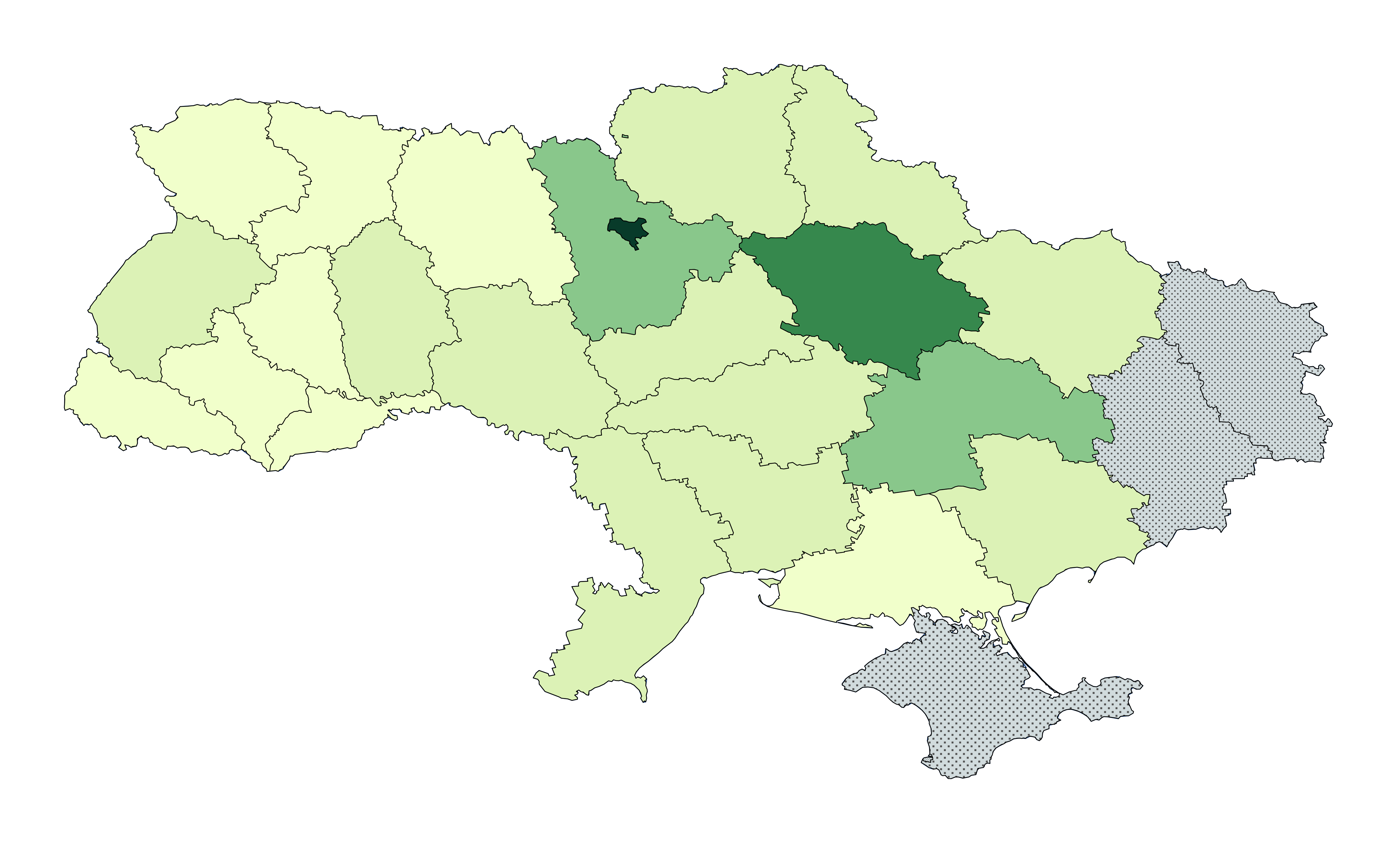
Regions of Ukraine by GDP per capita (2021) Map key: > €8,000 > €4,000 > €3,000 > €2,000 > €1,000 N/A

The values were calculated based on the 2021 population and GDP data, using the exchange rate of 0.0205972374985067 euro (EUR) per hryvnia (UAH). The values are given in both EUR and UAH.

All administrative divisions, except Kyiv, Sevastopol and Autonomous Republic of Crimea, are oblasts of Ukraine.

Administrative division	GDP		Population	GDP per capita	
Administrative division	mil. EUR	mil. UAH	Population	EUR	UAH
Kyiv	26,290	1,276,376	2,952,301	8,905	432,333
Dnipropetrovsk Oblast	11,995	582,363	3,096,485	3,874	188,072
Kharkiv Oblast	6,587	319,796	2,598,961	2,534	123,048
Lviv Oblast	6,101	296,182	2,478,133	2,462	119,518
Kyiv Oblast	6,004	291,519	1,795,079	3,345	162,399
Odesa Oblast	5,596	271,669	2,351,392	2,380	115,535
Poltava Oblast	5,493	266,694	1,352,283	4,062	197,218
Zaporizhzhia Oblast	4,715	228,906	1,638,462	2,878	139,708
Vinnytsia Oblast	3,574	173,531	1,509,515	2,368	114,958
Cherkasy Oblast	2,701	131,154	1,160,744	2,327	112,991
Mykolaiv Oblast	2,557	124,162	1,091,821	2,342	113,720
Khmelnytskyi Oblast	2,469	119,876	1,228,829	2,009	97,553
Ivano-Frankivsk Oblast	2,465	119,680	1,351,822	1,824	88,532
Zhytomyr Oblast	2,346	113,919	1,179,032	1,990	96,621
Chernihiv Oblast	2,337	113,474	959,315	2,436	118,286
Sumy Oblast	2,168	105,254	1,035,772	2,093	101,619
Kirovohrad Oblast	2,051	99,564	903,712	2,269	110,172
Volyn Oblast	1,906	92,535	1,021,356	1,866	90,600
Rivne Oblast	1,830	88,859	1,141,784	1,603	77,825
Kherson Oblast	1,816	88,182	1,001,598	1,813	88,041
Ternopil Oblast	1,678	81,485	1,021,713	1,643	79,753
Zakarpattia Oblast	1,558	75,626	1,244,476	1,252	60,769
Chernivtsi Oblast	1,124	54,582	890,457	1,263	61,297
Donetsk Oblast	N/A	N/A	N/A	N/A	N/A
Luhansk Oblast	N/A	N/A	N/A	N/A	N/A
Sevastopol	N/A	N/A	N/A	N/A	N/A
Autonomous Republic of Crimea	N/A	N/A	N/A	N/A	N/A

== See also ==
- List of Ukrainian oblasts and territories by salary
- List of Ukrainian regions by Human Development Index
