= Vasyl Nadraha =

Ukrainian politician

- Василь Надрага
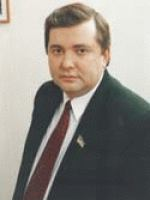
- Nadraha in 2010

8th Minister of Labor and Social Policy
- In office 11 March 2010 – 9 December 2010
- President: Viktor Yushchenko
- Prime Minister: Viktor Yanukovych
- Preceded by: Lyudmyla Denisova
- Succeeded by: Serhiy Tihipko

Personal details
- Born: 19 August 1958 (age 68) Kamensk, Kebansky, Buryatia ASSR, Soviet Union
- Spouse: Yevgenia Vsevoludavna
- Children: Kateryna
- Parent(s): Ivan Ivanovich (father); Tamara Vasylivna (mother)
- Education: Taras Shevchenko National University of Luhansk
- Profession: Politician

Military service
- Allegiance: Soviet Union
- Branch/service: Soviet Army
- Years of service: 1982–1984

Vasyl Ivanovich Nadraha (Ukrainian: Василь Іванович Надрага; born 19 August 1958) is a Ukrainian politician who became the eighth Minister of Labor and Social Policy in 2010.

== Biography ==
=== Early life and education ===
Vasyl is born on 19 August 1958 in the village of Kamensk, Buryatia ASSR, and graduated from the history faculty of the Luhansk State Pedagogical Institute in 1981, and the Luhansk Regional Institute of Management of the National Academy of Public Administration under the President of Ukraine in 1995.

=== Career ===
In October 1975, Vasyl was an apprentice locksmith at the Talovska mine in the city of Molodohvardiisk; the deputy secretary of the Komsomol Committee of the Luhansk State Pedagogical Institute in July 1981; in October 1982, he began serving in the Soviet Army; an engineer with the deputy secretary of the Komsomol Committee of the Luhansk Machine-Building Plant in July 1984; the second secretary of the Leninsky District Committee of the Luhansk State University of Luhansk in May 1985; the deputy director of secondary school No.17 in the city of Luhansk in July 1987.

Additionally, Vasyl became the artistic director of the Youth Center Panorama in the city of Luhansk in March 1990; an engineer at the Center for Scientific and Technical Creativity of Youth Soyuz in the city of Luhansk in May 1990; the deputy director of the Technopromtek Research and Production Enterprise in September 1990; the head of the economic division of the Leninsky District department of public education in the city of Luhansk in November 1992; a consultant on the work of the Luhansk City Council in August 1993; the head of the department of the Luhansk City Executive Committee in December 1993; the deputy chairman and chairman of the Kamianobrid District Council of the city of Luhansk in February 1995; the deputy chairman for political and legal issues of the Luhansk Regional State Administration in May 1998; the Head of the Luhansk Regional Department of the Pension Fund of Ukraine from December 1999 to 2002.

People's Deputy of Ukraine 4th convocation from April 2002 to April 2006, election district No.104; the 2005 presidential elections, confidant of the leader of the Party of Regions, Viktor Yanukovych; the first deputy general director of the Federation of Employers of Ukraine in September 2006; the chairman of the Board of the Social Insurance Fund for Temporary Disability in March 2009; the general director of the Federation of Employers of Ukraine in June 2009. Vasyl was appointed as the Minister of Labor and Social Policy of Ukraine from 11 March to 9 December 2010. He was present when the Trade Union of Education and Science Workers of Ukraine's 7th Congress was held on 17 November 2010. Trade Union of Education and Science Workers of Ukraine's regional organization in Kyiv On 20 August 2012, he was dismissed from the post of First Deputy Minister by decree of President Viktor Yanukovych.

== Personal life ==
Vasyl is married and has a daughter. His hobbies consisted of reading, fishing and billiards.

== Honours ==
Throughout his career, he has been awarded the following honours;

- Order of Merit Third Class (August 2003)
- Honorary Diploma of the Cabinet of Ministers of Ukraine (July 2003)

Political offices
Preceded by Lyudmyla Denisova	8th Minister of Labor and Social Policy; 11 March 2010 – 9 December 2010	Succeeded by Serhiy Tihipko
