= 2021 Kharkiv fire =

Incident in Ukraine

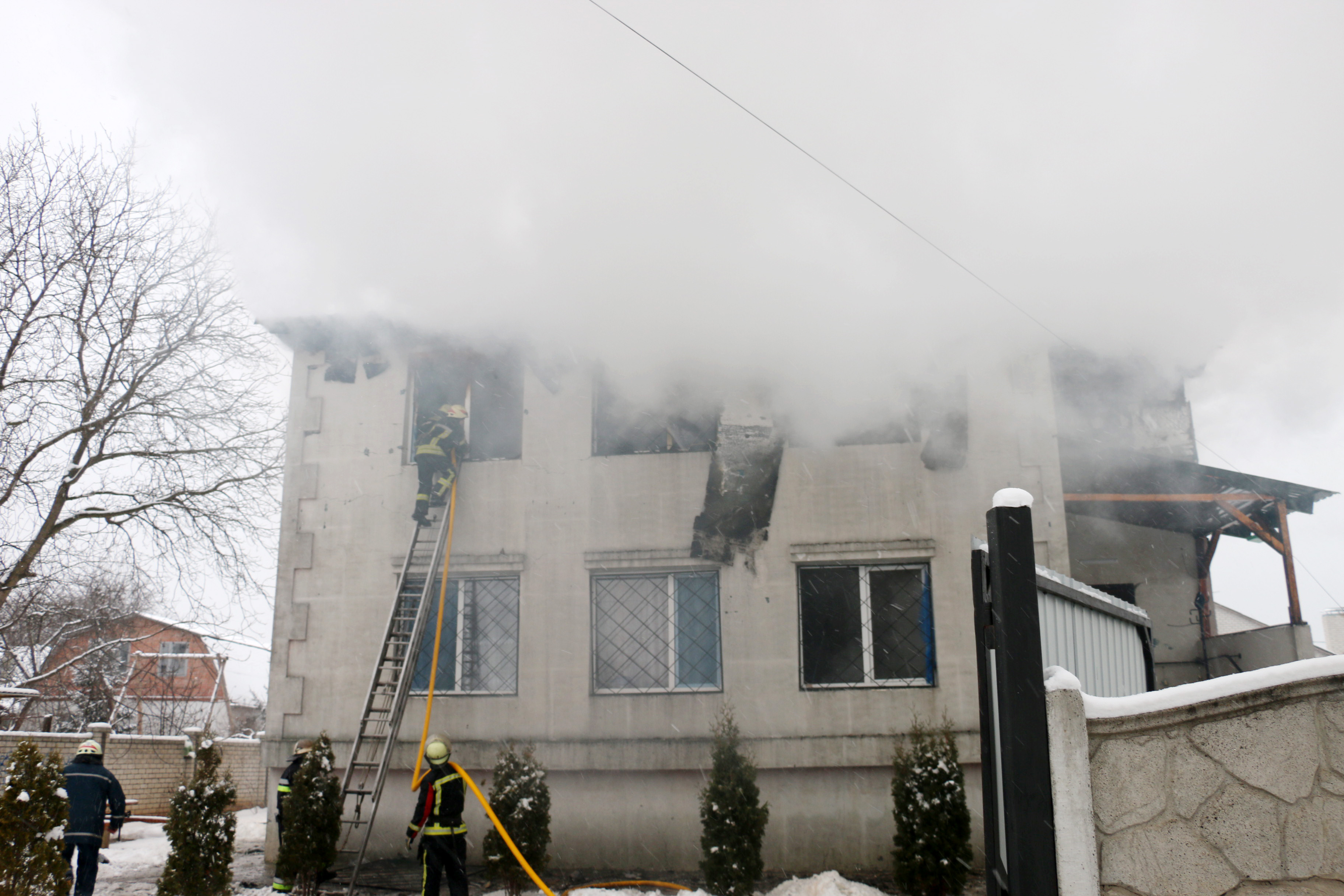
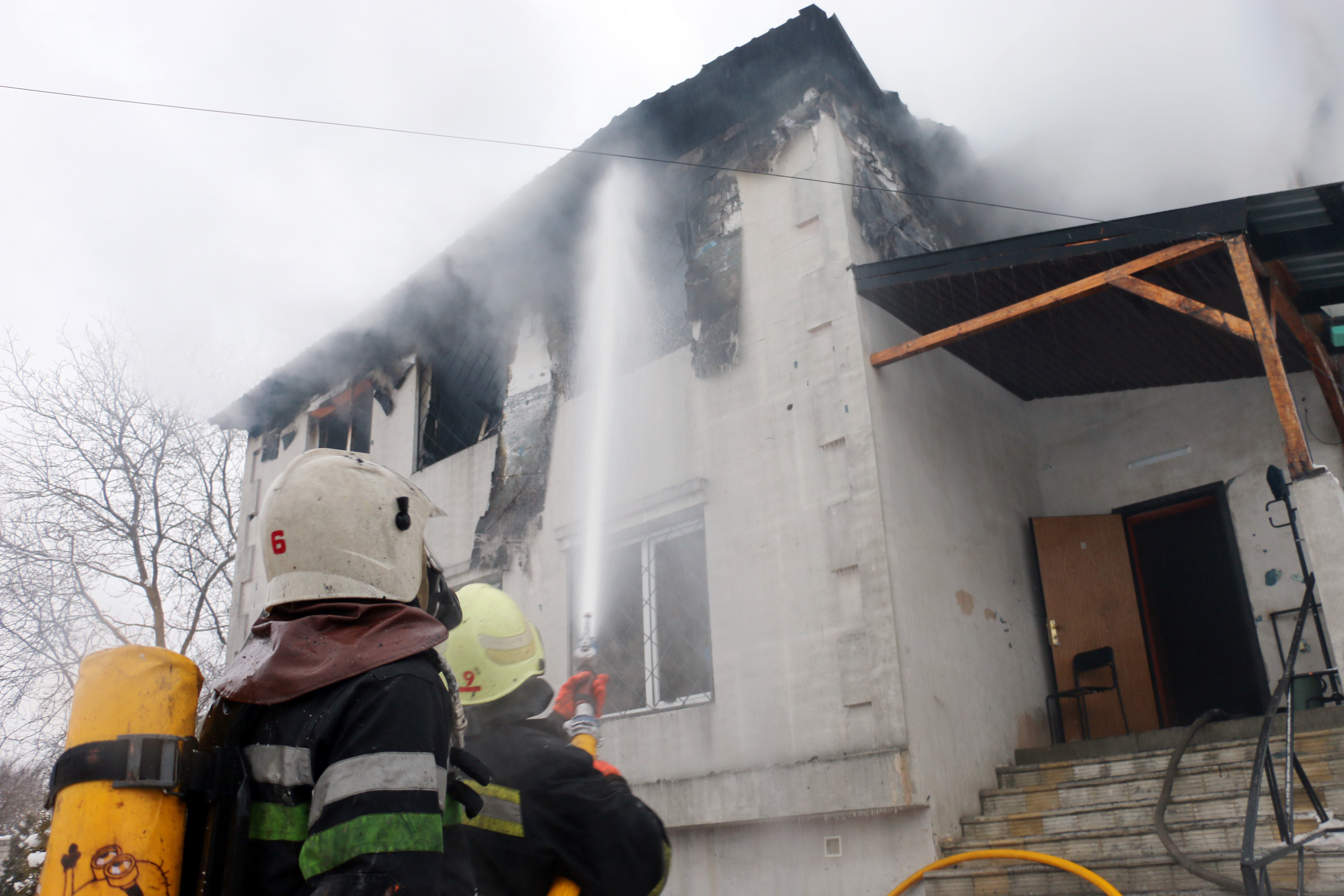
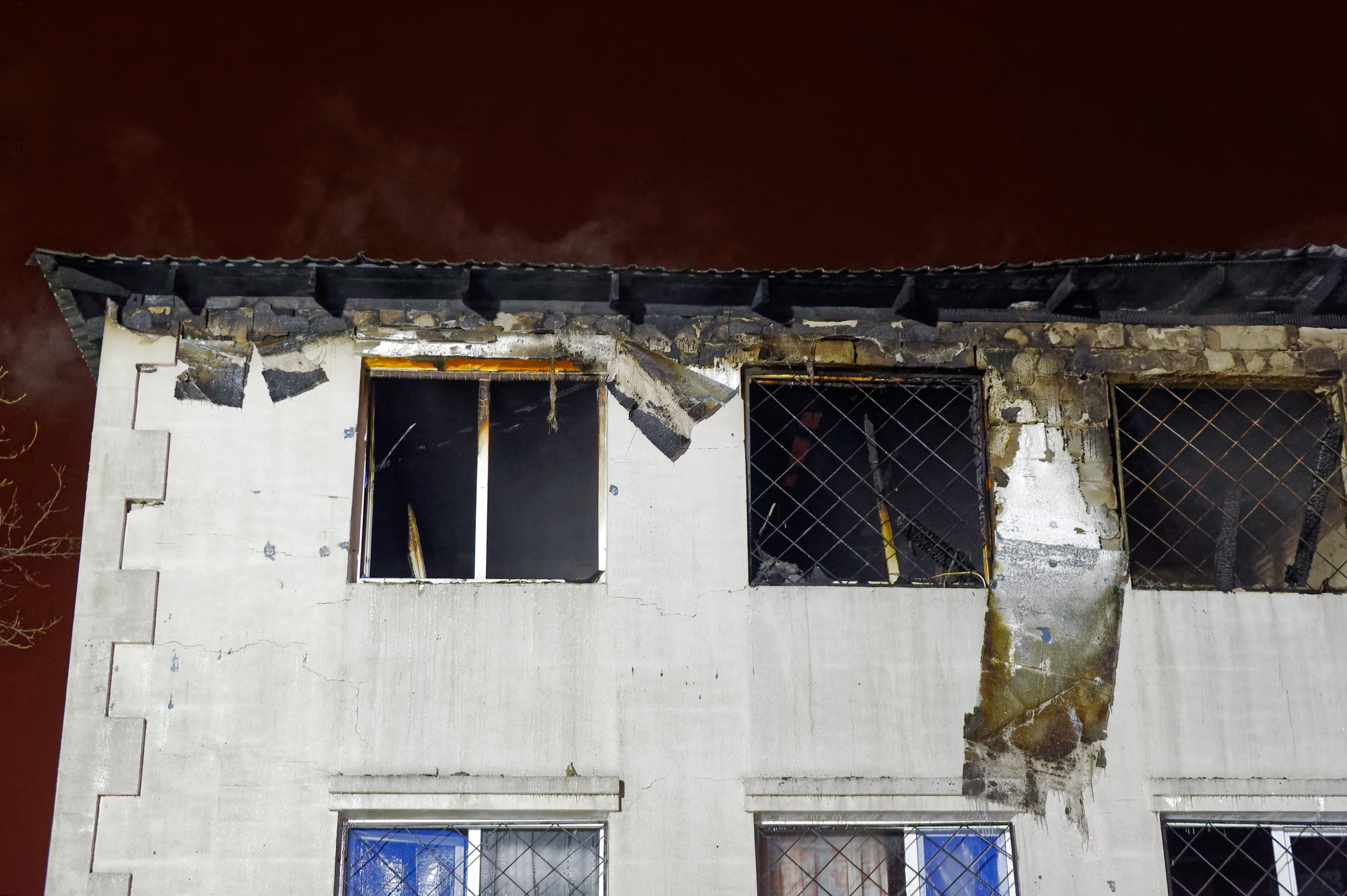
- Date: 21 January 2021
- Location: Kharkiv, Kharkiv Oblast, Ukraine; 49°59′43″N 36°09′48″E
- Deaths: 15
- Injuries: 11

On 21 January 2021, a fire broke out at an unregistered nursing home in Kharkiv, Ukraine. The fire killed 15 people and injured 11 others. Nine people were rescued and sent to the hospital.

== Background ==
According to residents of nearby houses, the Golden Time (Ukrainian: Золотий час, romanized: Zolotyi chas) nursing home had operated for about a year at the time of the fire. The building formerly was a drug rehabilitation centre, then it was rented by Baptists and then a porn studio. The nursing home advertised five meals a day, caregivers, placement in 1-5 person wards, and monthly analysis. A daughter of one of the victims said that she paid ₴6,500 monthly for the care of her father with dementia. The nursing home housed terminally ill patients.

== Fire ==
The fire was declared an oblast-level emergency.

Neighbours rushed to the burning building to save trapped residents after the noticed the smoke.

According to Prosecutor General of Ukraine Iryna Venediktova, the fire was caused by carelessness with electrical heaters. Electric heaters are considered unsafe in Kharkiv due to the inadequate design of electrical infrastructure in that area.

The nursing home had wooden floors and no fire-fighting mechanisms, which contributed to the rapid spread of the fire. A relative of one of the victims said that there was no fire extinguisher in the ground floor lobby, but she did not see the heaters that caused the fire. The prosecutor, Oleksandr Dobroskok, said that there were no fire extinguishers in the building.

The fifteen people that died had apparently been trapped on the second floor, where there were bars on the windows. The victims were suffocated by the smoke. The house was heavily damaged, with much of the second floor apparently gutted. According to Viktor Starovir, one of the survivors, the roof was on fire and some people had to be carried out of the burning building.

== Investigation and trial ==
Investigators initially considered three possibilities for the cause of the fire: arson, recklessness with fire and electrical appliances, and an electrical short circuit. Iryna Venediktova, the prosecutor general of Ukraine, declared the preliminary cause of the fire was the "careless handling of electric heating devices".

The police chief of Kharkiv, Andrii Rubel, declared that the owner of the nursing home, Slavik Akopian, was remanded to a pre-trial detention centre and that the six other nursing homes that Akopian owned were closed. Akopian appealed to be released under house arrest, citing his age (he was 67 at the time of the trial) and large family (he had four children). The prosecutor, Oleksandr Dobroskok denied his request because Rubel's neglect of fire safety led to a "terrible traged[y]". As of January 2024, all four defendants in the trial were released on bail.

== Responses ==
Kharkiv's acting mayor Ihor Terekhov declared 22 January 2021 a day of mourning.

The Minister of Social Policy, Maryna Lazebna, said that the nursing home did not "operate within the legal framework".

President Volodymyr Zelenskyy announced an investigation into unregistered care facilities in Kharkiv Oblast, which was conducted by police officers and local officials. It found that 32 more unlicensed nursing homes and drug rehabilitation centres were operating illegally in Kharkiv Oblast.

The Verkhovna Rada approved a bill to increase fines for fire code violations in January 2021 as result of the fire.

Each victim's family received ₴10,000 from the Kharkiv City Council, and they also covered all burial and medical costs of the victims.

On 20 February 2024, the Kharkiv Regional Prosecutor's Office declared that the nursing home would be demolished because they determined that it was built illegally on land that was not leased.
