= MTB BANK =

Ukrainian bank

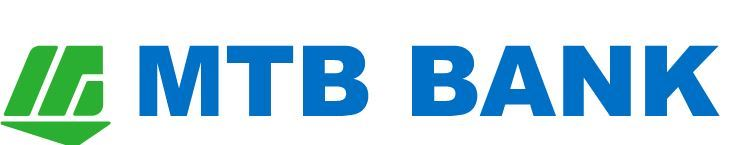

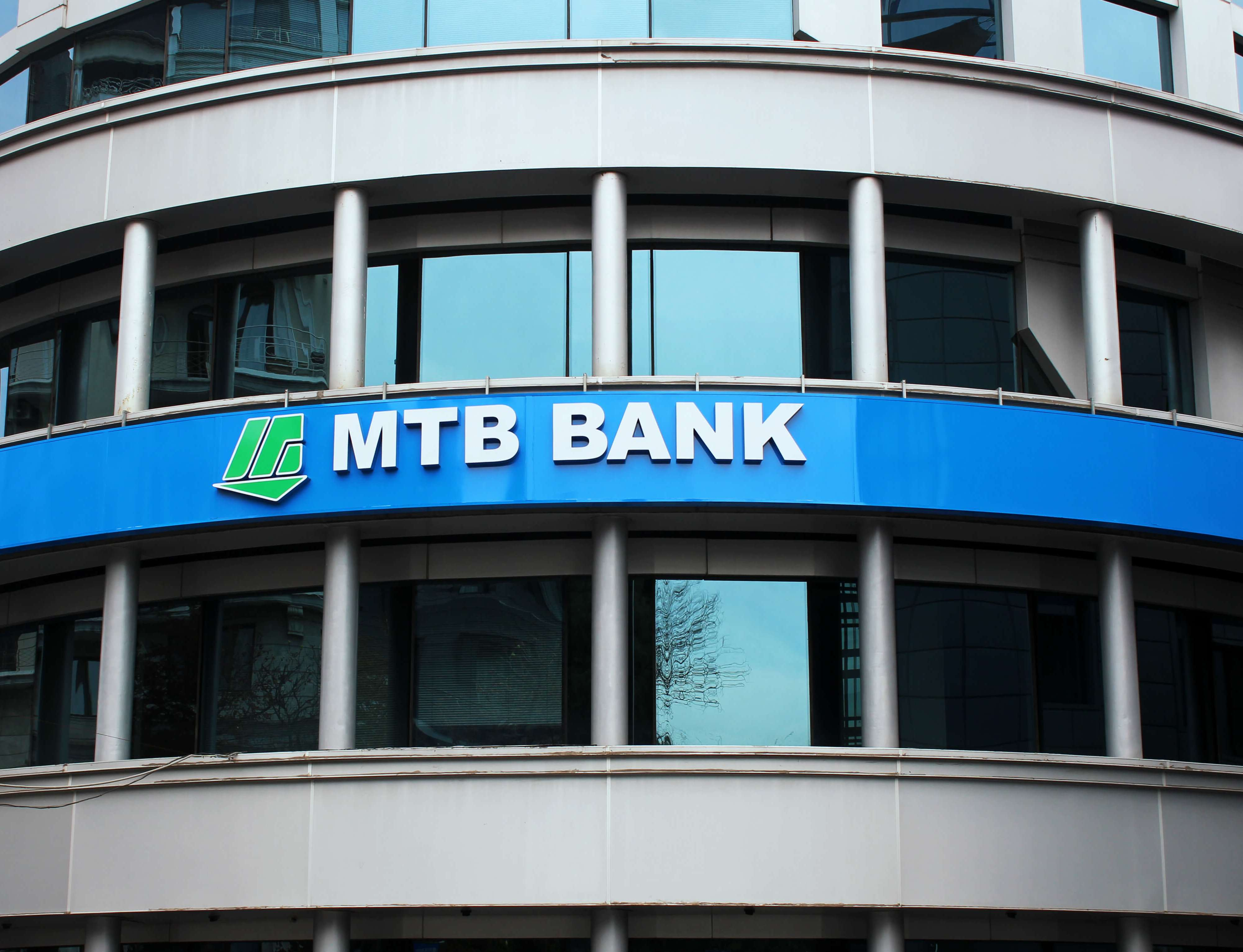
- Bank's head office in Odesa, 2021
- Type: Public joint-stock company
- Industry: Banking, investment
- Founded: 1993
- Headquarters: Odesa, Ukraine
- Key people: Yuriy Kralov (Chairman of the board), Igor Zgurov (Chairman of the Supervisory Boar)
- Services: Financial services
- Revenue: Equity ₴ 953 million (2020)
- Net income: ▲₴122 million (2020)
- Number of employees: 950
- Website: mtb.ua

MTB BANK (Ukrainian: МТБ БАНК) is a commercial bank in Ukraine, which was founded on November 5, 1993 as the open joint stock company Marfin Bank. Since June 2017, the bank has been managed by board chairman Yuriy Kralov and supervisory board chairman Igor Zgurov.

The bank was rebranded and was renamed as public joint stock company MTB BANK in 2017.

License of the National Bank of Ukraine No.66 dated 19 March 2018. The equity of MTB BANK PJSC is ₴953 million. The assets of MTB BANK are ₴18,34 billion.

MTB BANK is the authorized bank of the Pension Fund of Ukraine(in Ukrainian).

== History ==
MTB Bank was established by the decision of the Constituent Assembly on 15 September 1993 (Protocol No.1) and was registered by the National Bank of Ukraine on 5 November 1993, under No. 207 as the interregional joint stock bank MiDO. Between the 1990s and the 2010s, the bank underwent a series of name changes, becoming Mortorgbank in November 1994 (Protocol No. 6 dated 10 November 1994); Marine Transport Bank in January 1996 (Protocol No. 9 dated 19 January 1996); Marfin Bank in July 2010 (Protocol No. 36 dated 8 July 2010);; and most recently MTB Bank in December 2017 (Protocol No. 56 dated 28 December 2017). Such changes did not affect the organizational and legal form of management of the bank and did not require the termination of the bank as a joint stock company according to the legislation of Ukraine that was in force on the date of the above changes.

== Operations and memberships ==
Public joint stock company MTB BANK is a member/participant of interbank associations, stock exchanges, associations and international organizations:

- Deposit Guarantee Fund for Individuals.
- International payment system MasterCard Worldwide (affiliate member).
- International payment system Visa International Inc. (associate member).
- UnionPay International.
- Ukrainian Interbank Association of Payment Systems Members.
- Partner of Western Union.
- Ukrainian Stock Traders Association.
- Professional Association of Capital Markets and Derivatives.
- "Settlement Center" PJSC.
- National Depository of Ukraine.
- Society for Worldwide Interbank Financial Telecommunication.
- Thomson Reuters.
- Authorized Bank of the Pension Fund of Ukraine.
- Independent Association of the Banks of Ukraine.

== Deposit and Credit Ratings ==
According to the independent rating agency Credit Rating, MTB BANK PJSC has maintained a deposit rating of 5 since 2009. Credit Rating most recently assigned a credit rating to MTB Bank in June 2020, when it received a rating of uaAA.

== Corporate social responsibility ==
MTB BANK PJSC has been the premium partner of the International [Music Festival] Odesa Classics and the sponsor of the annual art festival Velvet Season at the Odesa Opera and Ballet Theatre for many years.

MTB BANK PJSC also sponsors the annual Black Sea Ports Cup and Black Sea Cup [regatta |regattas], professional international tennis tournaments under the auspices of the [ITF].

It provides financial support to the Monsters Corporation [charity organization] and participates in fighting COVID-19 projects.

== Awards and honors ==
2009 – Bank with a high level of business openness and transparency (First National Competition Bank of the Year 2009 according to the magazine [Banker]).

2011 – European Quality Award of the International Socratic Committee of the European Business Assembly (Oxford, UK).

2016 – Bank – a reliable partner in the world of business VIII All-Ukrainian competition BANK OF THE YEAR – 2016.

== Links ==
- Website of the National Bank of Ukraine
- Official site of PJSC MTB BANK
- Financial Club
- Banker Online magazine
