= Unemployment benefits in Ukraine =

As the unemployed according to the art. 2 of the Ukrainian Law on Employment of Population are qualified citizens capable of work and of employable age, who, due to lack of a job, do not have any income or other earnings laid down by the law and are registered in the State Employment Center as looking for work, ready and able to start working. This definition also includes persons with disabilities who have not attained retirement age and are registered as seeking employment.

== Who is entitled to unemployment benefits in Ukraine? ==
Only those citizens who are officially unemployed are entitled to unemployment benefits. According to part Ι art. 43 of the Law on Employment of Population this status is given to:

- individuals of working age before they attain retirement age who are unemployed and willing to start working;
- individuals under 16 years who have worked and were dismissed due to enterprises closure or reprofiling and redundancy and
- individuals with disabilities who have not attained pension age and are receiving disability pension or social welfare benefits.

In order to get official unemployed status, one needs to register at the State Employment Center. Registration requires providing all necessary documentation together with the application to the nearest Employment Center.

== Attendance of Employment Center and selection of the appropriate job ==
After being granted unemployed status, an individual is obliged to visit the Employment Center at least once every 30 calendar days while the workers of the Labour Exchange are trying to place them in a suitable job. A job is considered suitable if it matches the education, professional skills and work experience of the candidate.

If after a period of 6 months from registration it is not possible to find an appropriate job, the candidate would be encouraged to take acquire further education or skills or accept a job in a different field taking into account health, competencies and needs of the labor market. Employment Center staff would seek job placements for the candidate in both their old field and the new one in which they've retrained.

For disabled candidates, an appropriate job is selected according to their professional knowledge and skills and taking into account the medical certificate produced by an expert committee recommending conditions and character of work, the individual's rehabilitation program and the wishes of the disabled person regarding their working conditions.

Two-time refusal of the proposed job is a premise for deregistration from the Employment Center and deprivation of the official unemployed status. Repeat registration on the labor exchange is possible not earlier than in 90 calendar days since the deregistration day. Within this 3-month period the Employment Center will provide only consulting services, the payment of the unemployment assistance will not take place.

Skipping the appointed visiting of the Employment Center date without any valid reason causes payment reduction and/or deregistration from the labor exchange. According to the Decree of the Ukrainian Cabinet of Ministers No.198 from 20.03.2013 "About the order of registration, re-registration of unemployed individuals and introduction of job-seeking individuals", valid reasons for skipping a visit include an illness, death of the family members and relatives, care of ill child (under 14 years), or attending the hospital, court and law-enforcement authorities, conscription office, or other government body.

== Assessment and payment of unemployment benefits ==
The start of benefits payments can vary. The financial assistance is assigned from the 8th day after registration with the Employment Center, as stated in the Law on Mandatory State Social Unemployment Insurance. It does not apply if the person voluntary resigned from the previous workplace without having substantial reasons for it (art. 38 of the Labour Code of Ukraine) or was dismissed on the basis of violation of labor discipline. In the mentioned cases the payments are made from the 91st day after registration.

=== Payment period ===
In line with the Ukrainian law the total duration of the unemployed assistance payment can not exceed 360 calendar days during within 2 years time. But a number of nuances exist which influence the duration of unemployment benefits provision. Hence the payment periods could be as follows:

- 720 days - for individuals approaching retirement age (2 years before retirement)
- 360 days - standard payment duration for the majority of Ukrainian citizens
- 270 days - by voluntary resignation from the last workplace without having substantial reasons and in consonance with the points 3,4,7,8 art. 40 and articles 37,41 and 45 of the Labour Code of Ukraine. The mentioned points deal with non-fulfilment of responsibilities, theft, coming to work not sober.
- 180 days - for migrants as well as young people who finished their school, college and university education, or released from military recruitment.

=== Payment amount ===
Minimum monthly financial assistance amount in 2018 accounts for ₴544. The minimum amount is paid to the persons whose contribution period for the last calendar year is less than 6 months or was dismissed from the previous workplace for the reasons named in the points 3,4,7,8 art. 40, art.41 and 45 of the Labour Code of Ukraine, also to migrants, graduates of educational institutions (without work experience) and demobilized soldiers from the army service.

Payments for unemployed people whose contribution period for the last 12 months before the registration on the labour exchange exceed half a year or who have work interruption for justifiable reasons (e.g. fixed-term military service, education, care of disabled persons in the first category and pensioner who is in need of permanent care) are calculated as proportional relation to their average monthly income in connection with their contribution period, but the benefit payment can not be less than the minimum financial assistance amount set for this category (₴1,280):

Number of years of qualifying period	Amount of financial assistance (in % of the wage)
less than 2 years	50
from 2 to 6 years	55
from 6 to 10 years	60
more than 10 years	70

Amount of the assistance payment smoothly decreases in accordance to unemployment duration. It means first 90 days an unemployed individual receives 100% of the appointed to him financial assistance, during the following 90 days - 80%, during the remaining period the payments amount to 70%.

The maximum amount of financial assistance can not exceed quadruple amount of the subsistence minimum for individuals capable of working - now it is ₴6,400.

Unemployment benefits in Ukraine are paid out by the State Social Security Fund in case of Unemployment (a part of the Ministry of Social Policy of Ukraine) and financed by employers. An insured person pays 0.6% of its wages to the State Social Security Fund in case of Unemployment. A self-employed can only contribute voluntarily. The employer pays 1.6% of the total wage. To be able to receive unemployment benefits one must be registered at an employment office, be able and willing to work, and have income less than the minimum wage (the minimum wage in Ukraine is ₴1,218). The benefit may be reduced, suspended, or terminated after a discharge for violating work rules or for filing in a fraudulent claim. The benefit is based on 50% of average earnings for persons with a 2 to 6-year career, 55% of average earnings for persons with a 6 to 10 years 60% of average earnings and if one has worked more than 10 years he will receive 70% of average earnings. In the first 90 calendar days 100% of the benefit is paid, the next 90 calendar days 80% is paid and after that time period 70%.

Being in the initial stages of economic reconstruction, social protection issues will be of primary importance in Ukraine. If their incomes are below the minimum living standard, pensioners and children, in particular, should receive targeted money allowances. The official latent unemployment rate is 20-30%. The rapid small-scale privatization, privatization of unfinished construction projects (whose number is greater than 9,000), and the liberalization procedures required to start private businesses will reduce the amount of unemployment. Furthermore, Ukraine has adopted stricter rules for being able to register as unemployed as well as raised the unemployment benefit payments to its people. Current unemployment rate was 8.8% as of the year 2017. By providing support to workers during various employment-related risks, such as unemployment, social policies raise the reservation wage of workers. This allows workers to reject jobs that may not correspond to their skill qualifications. Thus, social policies indirectly support the investments in skills made by employers.

== Impacts of the Russo-Ukrainian War on unemployment ==
The Russo-Ukrainian War has caused a large and growing internal flow of people leaving the areas of warfare and needing to find new jobs and income in other parts of the country. It is estimated that up to 2 million jobs were lost since the start of the crisis and the unemployment rate rose from 7.6% in 2014 to 9.6 a year later. The oblasts of Luhansk and Donetsk have seen the most drastic increases in unemployment rate leading to 57% of the population reportedly having difficulties meeting their essential needs. Overcoming the high unemployment rates, particularly in war-torn areas, requires including the formation of the demand for certain specialists from the side of the government, the introduction of relevant education subsidies, as well as economic reforms to attract investments.

== Current structure of Ukrainian benefits program ==
Unemployment insurance, which provides unemployment benefits, lump-sum benefits for employees, vocational training, retraining and occupational development for the unemployed are several of the policies in place that assist those who are without a job. Injured workers are able to use employment injury insurance, which provides benefits to injured persons as well as medical care. The current system of social security in Ukraine is financed by both the state and local budgets. The Social Security Rate is a tax related with income charged to both companies and employees. It serves as an important source of income for the government because they help to pay for many programs such as welfare, health care, and many other benefits. This will not be sustainable in the future as nearly half of Ukraine's able-bodied adults are not paying their taxes or social contributions, but still demand social services and benefits.

== See also ==
- List of Ukrainian oblasts and territories by salary
- Pensions in Ukraine
