= Yuliya Sokolovska =

Ukrainian politician

- Юлія Соколовська
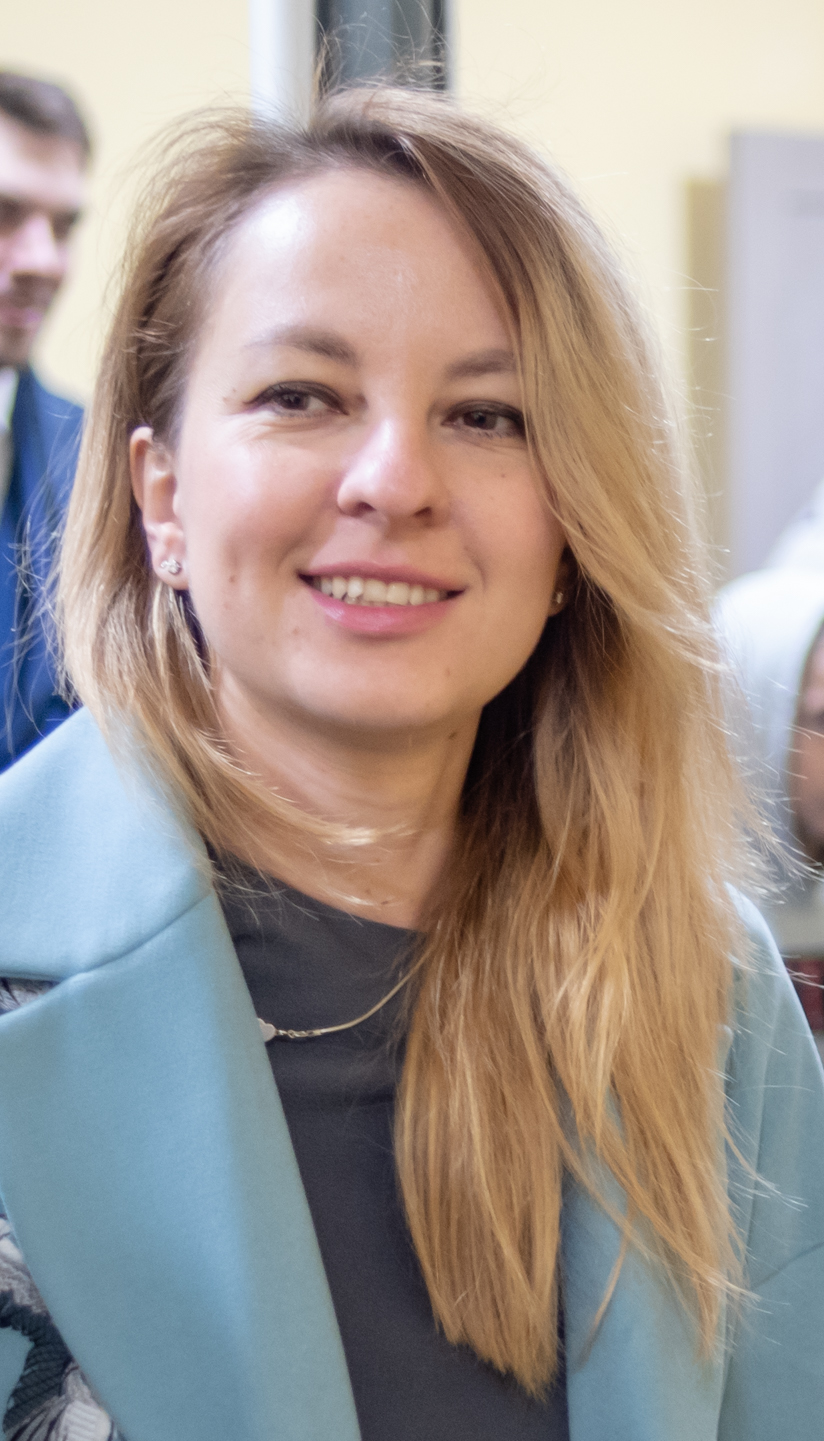
- Sokolovska in 2019
- President: Volodymyr Zelenskyy
- Prime Minister: Oleksiy Honcharuk

Ambassador of Ukraine to Spain
- Incumbent
- Assumed office 21 July 2025

Deputy Head of the Office of the President of Ukraine
- In office 12 March 2020 – 5 September 2024

6th Minister of Social Policy of Ukraine
- In office 29 August 2019 – 4 March 2020
- Preceded by: Andriy Reva
- Succeeded by: Maryna Lazebna

Personal details
- Born: Yuliya Serhiyivna Sokolovska; 12 April 1985 (age 41)
- Education: Kyiv National Economic University; National Academy of State Administration
- Occupation: activist civil servant politician

Yuliya Serhiyivna Sokolovska (Ukrainian: Юлія Сергіївна Соколовська; born 12 April 1985) is a Ukrainian activist, civil servant and politician who has been Ambassador of Ukraine to Spain since 21 July 2025.

On 29 August 2019 Sokolovska was appointed as the Minister of Social Policy of Ukraine. In the 4 March 2020 appointed Shmyhal Government she did not return. From 12 March 2020 to 5 September 2024, she was Deputy Head of the Office of the President of Ukraine responsible for social affairs.

== Biography ==
Sokolovska studied at the Kyiv National Economic University (2007). She also graduated from the National Academy of State Administration (2016).

In 2007 Sokolovska started a career in the private sector.

In 2009 Sokolovska started working at the Kyiv City State Administration.

From 2014 to 2015, Sokolovska headed the Document Management Department of the Ministry of Economic Development and Trade. From 2015 to 2016, she served as Director of the Department of Social Budget Expenditures in the Ministry of Finance. From 2016 to 2017, she headed the Department of Strategic Planning and Coordination of State Policy of the Secretariat of Cabinet of Ministers.

On 29 August 2019 Sokolovska was appointed as the Minister of Social Policy of Ukraine in the Honcharuk Government. When this Government fell and was replaced on 4 March 2020 with the Shmyhal Government she did not hold her post in the new Government.

On 12 March 2020 Sokolovska was appointed Deputy Head of the Office of the President of Ukraine (of President Volodymyr Zelenskyy) responsible for social affairs. She was dismissed on 5 September 2024.

On 21 July 2025, Zelenskyy appointed her Ambassador to Spain.

== See also ==
- Honcharuk Government
