= Denys Uliutin =

Ukrainian politician (born 1982)

- Денис Улютін
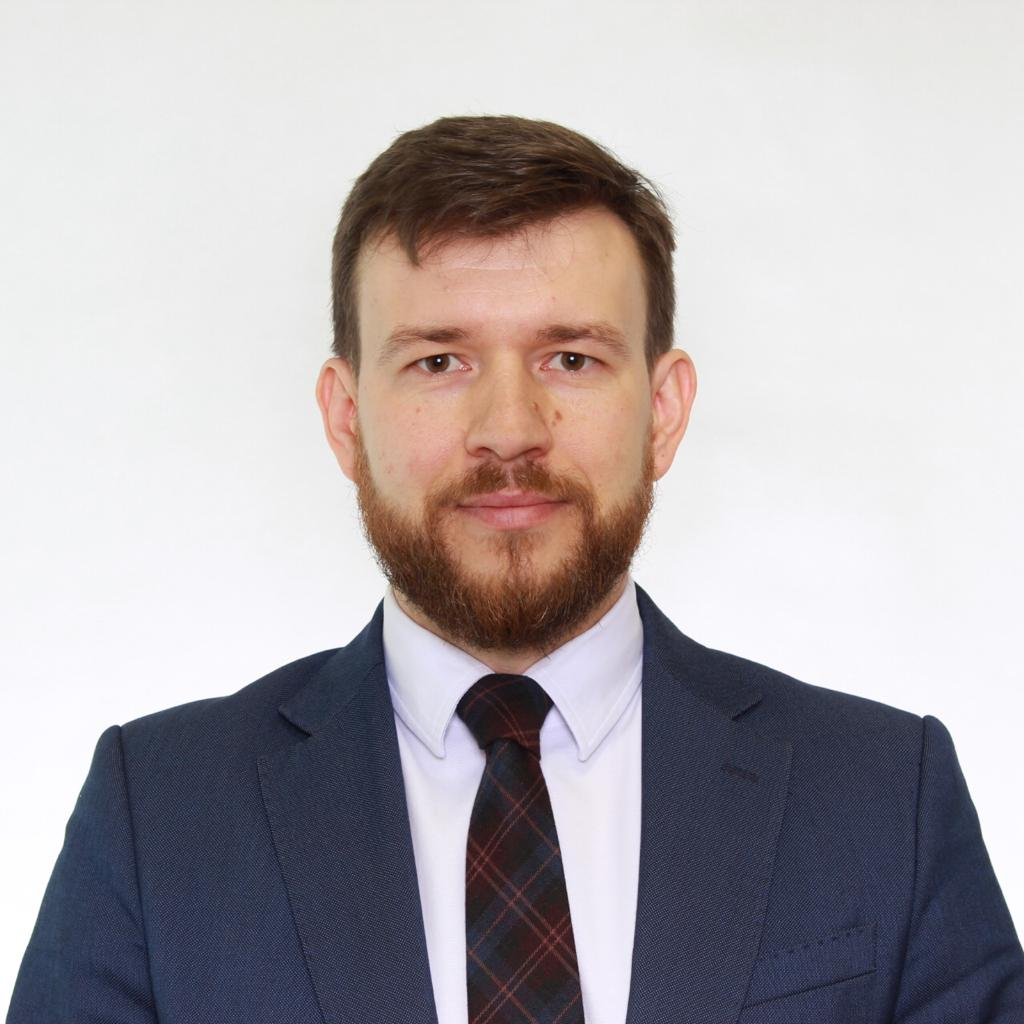
- Uliutin in 2020

Minister of Social Policy
- Incumbent
- Assumed office 17 July 2025
- President: Volodymyr Zelenskyy
- Prime Minister: Yulia Svyrydenko; Serhii Koretskyi
- Preceded by: Oksana Zholnovych

Personal details
- Born: 18 April 1982 (age 44)

Denys Valeriiovych Uliutin (Ukrainian: Денис Валерійович Улютін; born 18 April 1982) is a Ukrainian politician serving as Minister of Social Policy since July 2025. From 2020 to 2025, he served as First Deputy Minister of Finance.

== Biography ==
Uliutin was born on 18 April 1982. In 2004, he graduated from the National Academy of the State Tax Service with a master's degree in finance, and afterwords he began working as a civil servant. Early in his career he was a chief state tax inspector for the State Taxation Administration of Ukraine, until March 2010 when he transferred to the Office of the Prime Minister of Ukraine. He worked within the office until April 2016, when he was transferred and subsequently promoted to Head of the Patronage Service of the Minister of Finance of Ukraine. In June 2017 he received a commendation from the ministry.

From April 2019 to April 2020 he served as Deputy State Secretary of the Secretariat of the Cabinet of Ministers, and then from 2020 to 2025 as first deputy minister of finance. As a representative of the state, he was also part of the Supervisory Board of Ukrgasbank during this time. He was appointed minister of social policy in 2025. As minister, he said his main priorities are the digitalization of social services, strengthening protection for vulnerable groups, and targeting social assistance by cooperating with the European Union in order to follow the EU's integration process. He has also stated that in the position he would focus on fiscally grounding the ministry by avoiding populism and instead using financial realism.

== Personal life ==
He is married to Olena Ulyutina, who taught at the National University of Life and Environmental Sciences of Ukraine. They have one daughter named Vladyslava.
