= Pavlo Rozenko =

Ukrainian politician

- Павло Розенко
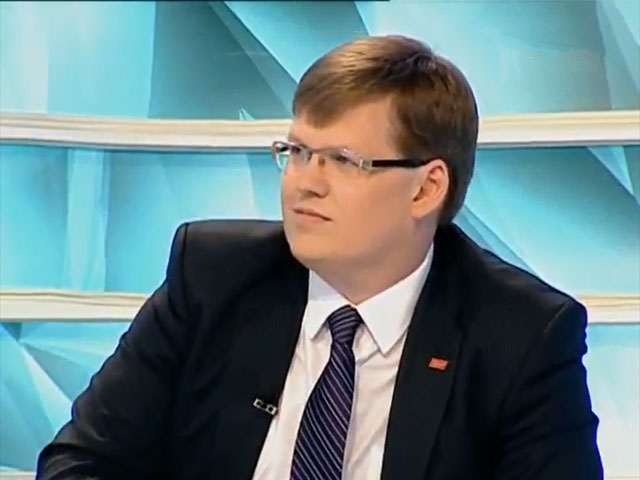
- Rozenko in 2013

Vice Prime Minister of Ukraine
- In office 14 April 2016 – 29 August 2019
- Prime Minister: Volodymyr Groysman

4th Minister of Social Policy of Ukraine
- In office 2 December 2014 – 14 April 2016
- Prime Minister: Arseniy Yatsenyuk
- Preceded by: Lyudmyla Denisova
- Succeeded by: Andriy Reva

People's Deputy of Ukraine

7th convocation
- In office December 12, 2012 – November 27, 2014
- Constituency: UDAR, No.10

8th convocation
- In office November 27, 2014 – December 2, 2014
- Constituency: Petro Poroshenko Bloc, No.26

Personal details
- Born: July 15, 1970 (age 55) Kyiv, Ukraine
- Party: UDAR
- Other political affiliations: People's Movement of Ukraine
- Education: Kyiv Polytechnic Institute (1993)
- Occupation: Politician

Pavlo Valeriyovych Rozenko (Ukrainian: Павло Валерійович Розенко; born July 15, 1970) is a Ukrainian politician and a former Vice Prime Minister of Ukraine and a former Minister of Labor and Social Policy.

== Early life ==
Rozenko was born onn Jult 15, 1970, in the city of Kyiv, which was then part of the Ukrainian SSR in the Soviet Union. Rozenko was a member of the Ukrainian Student Society and the People's Movement of Ukraine since 1989. He participated in the 1990 Student Revolution (also known as the Revolution on Granite) in Kyiv that led to dismissal of the First Masol Government. In 1993, he graduated from the Kyiv Polytechnic Institute, and afterwords immediately starting working at the National Public Broadcasting Company of Ukraine (also known as Suspilne).

== Political career ==
In 1994, he became an assistant-consultant to a People's Deputy of Ukraine of the Verkhovna Rada, which he did for 6 years until 2000. From 2000 to 2001 he was briefly an advisor to the Minister of Ecology and head of the personal office of the minister. However, he then returned to being an assistant-consultant for a People's Deputy of Ukraine from 2001 to 2005 afterwards. From 2005 to 2006 he was First Deputy Minister of Labor and Social Policy of Ukraine, and then from 2006 to 2008 Deputy Head of the Main Service for Socio-Economic Development and simultaneously Head of the Department of Social Policy of the Secretariat of the President of Ukraine.

From 2008 until 2010, Rozenko was First Deputy Minister of Labor and Social Policy of Ukraine in the Second Tymoshenko Government under his current predecessor, Lyudmyla Denisova, as minister. From March 2010 till September 2011 he worked as an expert on social, economic and budgetary policies at Razumkov Center. Rozenko was elected to Ukrainian Parliament in 2012 from the UDAR party, and re-elected in 2014. In 2014 he was elected after placing 26th on the electoral list of Petro Poroshenko Bloc.

Pavlo Rozenko is a grandson of the former Ukrainian statesman a deputy Chairman of the Council of Ministers of the Ukrainian SSR and the Chairman of DerzhPlan, Petro Rozenko.

Since 2019, he has been engaged in public and political activities and expert work. Expert of UNAIDS - the Joint United Nations Program on HIV/AIDS.

From 2021 to the present; Vice President of the Ukrainian Red Cross Society.

Political offices
Preceded by Lyudmyla Denisova	Minister of Social Policy of Ukraine; 2014–2016	Succeeded by Andriy Reva
