= Liudmyla Denisova =

Ukrainian politician (born 1960)

- Людмила Денісова
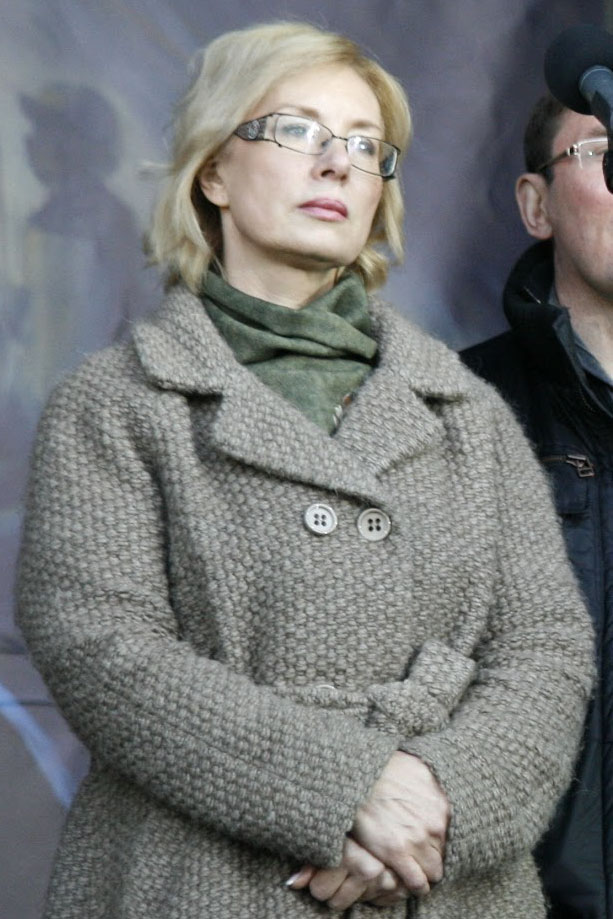
- Denisova in 2014

3rd Ombudsman in Ukraine
- In office 15 March 2018 – 31 May 2022
- President: Petro Poroshenko; Volodymyr Zelenskyy
- Prime Minister: Volodymyr Groysman; Oleksiy Honcharuk; Denys Shmyhal
- Preceded by: Valeriya Lutkovska
- Succeeded by: Dmytro Lubinets

3rd Minister of Social Policy of Ukraine
- In office 27 February 2014 – 2 December 2014
- President: Oleksandr Turchynov; Petro Poroshenko
- Prime Minister: Arseniy Yatsenyuk
- Preceded by: Natalia Korolevska
- Succeeded by: Pavlo Rozenko
- In office 18 December 2007 – 11 March 2010
- President: Viktor Yanukovych
- Prime Minister: Yulia Tymoshenko
- Preceded by: Mykhailo Papiev
- Succeeded by: Vasyl Nadraha

People's Deputy of Ukraine
- In office 27 November 2014 – 15 March 2018
- In office 15 December 2012 – 27 February 2014
- In office 25 May 2006 – 18 December 2007

Personal details
- Born: 6 July 1960 (age 66) Arkhangelsk, Russian SFSR, Soviet Union (now Russia)
- Party: People's Front
- Other political affiliations: Batkivshchyna (2005–2014)
- Spouse: Oleksandr Ivanovych
- Children: Olena; Oleksandra
- Occupation: Politician, teacher, lawyer and economist

Liudmyla Leontiivna Denisova (Note: Ukrainian: Людмила Леонтіївна Денісова; Russian: Людмила Леонтьевна Денисова, romanized: Lyudmila Leontyevna Denisova) (born 6 July 1960) is a Ukrainian politician. After twice serving as Minister of Social Policy of Ukraine, Denisova worked as Ombudsman for Human Rights in Ukraine from March 2018 to May 2022.

== Biography ==
Raised by her mother Nina Ivanovna Ankudinova (born 1934) in Arkhangelsk, Denisova graduated from the Arkhangelsk Pedagogical School (1978), Leningrad State University (1989), and the Tavria Institute of Enterprise and Law in Simferopol (1995).

=== Professional career ===
Denisova was a teacher at a preschool in Arkhangelsk from 1979 to 1980. For the next nine years, Denisova held different posts in the Arkhangelsk provincial law court. In 1989, she moved to Ukraine and became the legal adviser of the Crimean Provincial Committee of Ukraine (1990–91). From 1991 she worked in the Autonomous Republic of Crimea's Administration of the pension fund until 1998.

=== Political career ===
In 1998, Denisova became the Minister of Economy and Finances in the Crimean government. In Ukraine's Autonomous Republic of Crimea, she served as Minister of Economy, Minister of Finance and head of the Treasury Department. Denisova was named Politician of the Year in 2001. In 2000, Denisova was detained for 24 hours and charged with power abuse. Denisova has stated she was persecuted for refusing to sign a budget document. This criminal case was soon closed.

Denisova was a member of Batkivshchyna (Yulia Tymoshenko Bloc) from 2005 to 2014. During the 2006 and 2007, parliamentary elections, she was elected as a deputy to the Verkhovna Rada.

==== Minister ====
On 18 December 2007, Yulia Tymoshenko, with a margin of two votes, was elected Prime Minister, and the second Tymoshenko Government was formed between the Yulia Tymoshenko Bloc and Our Ukraine–People's Self-Defense Bloc in which Denisova was elected Minister of Labour and Social Policy.

In October 2009, Denisova was ranked 15th in the top 100 of "most influential women in Ukraine" compiled by experts for the Ukrainian magazine Focus (six places lower than non-minister and fellow Batkivshchyna member Natalia Korolevska).

==== 2010 Crimean parliamentary election ====
Denisova headed the electoral list of Batkivshchyna during the 2010 Crimean parliamentary election. Batkivshchyna did not win seats in the Supreme Council of Crimea.

==== 2012 Ukrainian parliamentary election ====
Denisova was placed at number 38 on the electoral list of Batkivshchyna during the 2012 Ukrainian parliamentary election. She was re-elected into the Verkhovna Rada

==== 2nd minister post ====
On 27 February 2014, Denisova became Minister of Labour and Social Policy in the Yatsenyuk Government.

In September 2014 Denisova became a founding member of the People's Front party.

In July 2017, she became Ukraine's head of the permanent delegation to represent the Organization of the Black Sea Economic Cooperation.

==== 2014 Ukrainian parliamentary election ====
In the 2014 Ukrainian parliamentary election, Denisova was re-elected into the Verkhovna Rada, placed 15th on the electoral list of People's Front.

==== Ombudsman for Human Rights in Ukraine ====
On 15 March 2018, the Verkhovna Rada appointed Denisova Ombudsman to head the Ukrainian Commission for Human Rights, where she led a team of human rights and constitutional lawyers.

In February 2019, following the Kerch Strait incident in which Russia and Ukraine's tensions had dramatically increased and the Federal Security Service had taken into custody a number of Ukrainian troops, Denisova was able to make contact with Tatyana Moskalkova, her Russian counterpart, via an impromptu meeting, and discuss the status of wounded Ukrainian prisoners of war. The latter had previously refused to meet with her after Denisova launched an official protest that she was not able to visit the Ukrainian wounded soldiers directly.

During the Russian invasion she was described as becoming "one of the leading voices of Ukraine's suffering and outrage, appearing frequently in news coverage and producing a copious stream of social media posts" She set up a hotline for citizens to report human rights violations and requests for help. According to New York Times, "The vast majority [of calls], more than 15,000 in the first six weeks of war, were for missing people, but requests also come in for humanitarian aid and safe corridors out of besieged cities... The information from callers is fed into a database that Ms. Denisova shares with government officials and prosecutors. As such, it has become an invaluable first warning system for the gross human rights abuses occurring in the cities under assault, and in the towns and villages occupied by Russian troops." Denisova argued that Russian forces were committing genocide, citing the systematic sexual violence by Russian troops and the forcible deportation of Ukrainian children to Russia. She said that in many cases Russian soldiers had called Ukrainian women "Nazi whores" and raped them "until they can't give birth, or give birth to their children" "This suggests that they want to destroy the Ukrainian nation. And when they kill children, it also means that they do not want our nation to be in this world."

On 31 May 2022, the Verkhovna Rada voted to dismiss her, using the provisions of Ukraine's martial law, for failing to facilitate humanitarian corridors in warzones, to prevent Ukrainians under Russian occupation from being deported to Russia, and to facilitate the protection and exchange of prisoners of war. The deputy chairman of the Rada regulatory committee said that Deputy Prime Minister Iryna Vereshchuk had had to take on most of the wartime human rights issues. An open letter from 140 activists, media professionals and lawyers criticized the rhetoric of her reports about sexual crimes by Russian forces just before her dismissal.

Some NGOs and human rights activists, including Opora, questioned the legality of her removal. The Global Alliance of National Human Rights Institutions (GANHRI) and the UN Human Rights Monitoring Mission in Ukraine (HRMMU) both criticised the procedure followed for dismissing Denisova, with HRMMU describing the dismissal as "violat[ing] international standards". As of 3 June 2022, a replacement had not been appointed. In June, Ukrainska Pravda published a report alleging that journalists and the Ukrainian Prosecutor's Office had only been able to verify some of the rapes Denisova had spoken about publicly. Additionally, the deputy chairman of Ukraine's parliament regulatory committee Pavlo Frolov said that Denisova's focus on reporting some unverified crimes had harmed Ukraine's reputation and distracted media attention from proven crimes and problems.

== Notes ==
Political offices
Preceded by Valeriya Lutkovska	Ombudsman of Ukraine; 2018–2022	Succeeded by Dmytro Lubinets
Preceded by Natalia Korolevska	Minister of Social Policy of Ukraine; 2014	Succeeded by Pavlo Rozenko
Preceded by Mykhailo Papiev	Minister of Labor and Social Policy of Ukraine; 2007–2010	Succeeded by Vasyl Nadraha
