= Oksana Zholnovych =

Ukrainian stateswoman and politician

- Оксана Жолнович
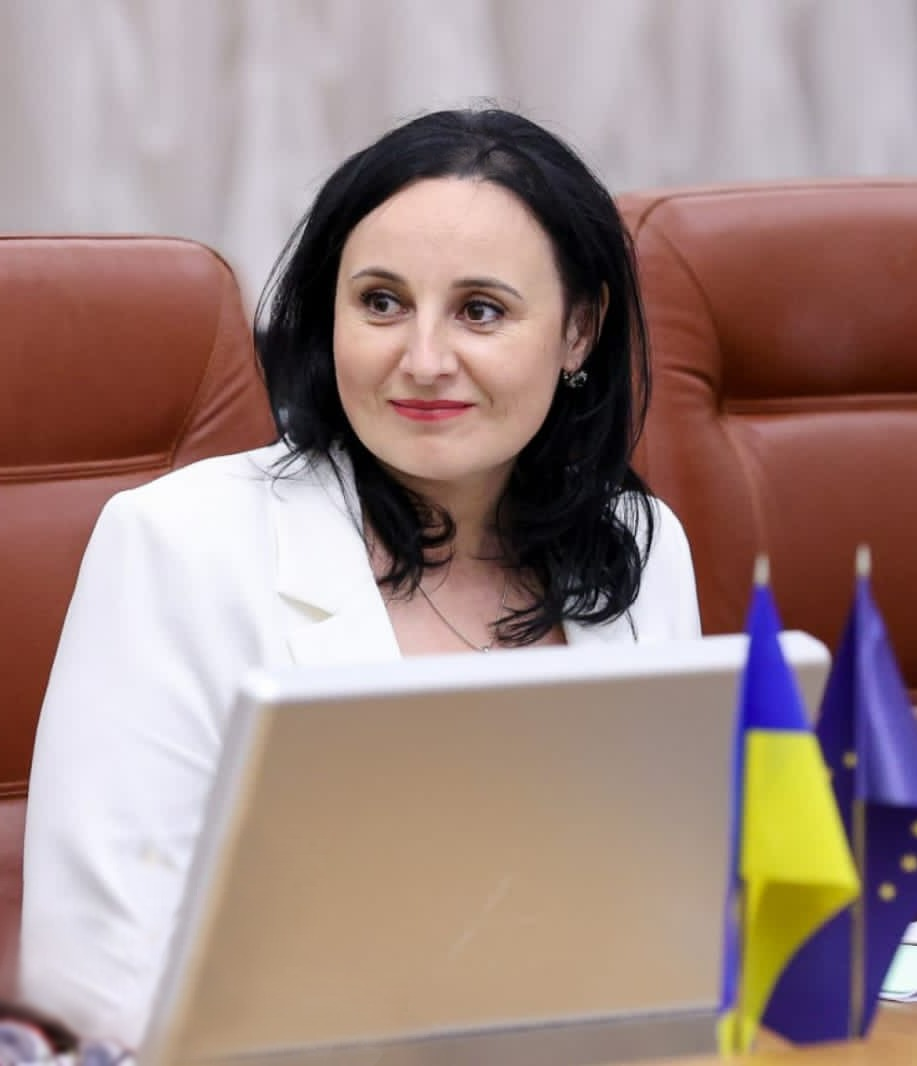
- Zholnovych in 2022

Minister of Social Policy
- In office 19 July 2022 – 17 July 2025
- President: Volodymyr Zelenskyy
- Prime Minister: Denys Shmyhal
- Preceded by: Maryna Lazebna
- Succeeded by: Denys Uliutin

Personal details
- Born: 21 February 1979 (age 47) Lviv, Ukrainian SSR, Soviet Union
- Party: Power of the People
- Education: University of Lviv
- Occupation: stateswoman politician

Oksana Ivanivna Zholnovych (Ukrainian: Оксана Іванівна Жолнович; born 21 February 1979) is a Ukrainian stateswoman and politician. On 19 July 2022, she was appointed as the Minister of Social Policy of Ukraine.

== Biography ==
In 2001, Zholnovych graduated from University of Lviv. Holds the title of PhD in Law.

Zholnovych took part in four different elections, national parliamentary elections, Lviv Oblast Council elections and Lviv City Council elections, as a candidate of Power of the People. In all the elections she failed to gain a seat.

From 2019 to 2020, she was an adviser to the Minister of Social Policy of Ukraine in the field of protection of persons with disabilities.

From 2020 to 2022, she was the head of the Department of Social Policy and Health Care of the Office of the President of Ukraine.

On July 19, 2022, the Verkhovna Rada of Ukraine appointed Oksana Zholnovych as Minister of Social Policy of Ukraine. This decision was supported by 282 deputies.

== See also ==
- Shmyhal Government
