= Pension Fund of Ukraine =

- Пенсійний Фонд України
- Insignia of the agency

Agency overview
- Formed: 1990
- Preceding agency: Pension Fund of Ukrainian SSR
- Type: Ministry department
- Jurisdiction: Ukraine
- Headquarters: 9, Bastionna street, Kyiv Ukraine 01601
- Employees: 7,000 (2016)
- Minister responsible: Andriy Reva, Minister of Social Policy of Ukraine
- Deputy Minister responsible: Oleksii Zarudnyi, Department Head
- Parent department: Cabinet of Ministers via Ministry of Social Policy
- Website: Official website

Map
- Jurisdiction of the agency Headquarters (Kyiv) marked with red dot

The Pension Fund of Ukraine is a central executive body that manages a solidarity system of compulsory state pension provision, collects, accumulates and records insurance premiums, allocates pensions and prepares documents for their payment, provides timely and full financing and payment pensions, burial assistance and other social benefits.

== Legislative status ==
According to the law, all pension payments are made from the Pension Fund of Ukraine. The Pension Fund of Ukraine monitors the target use of funds that go to payouts. The Pension Fund of Ukraine shall, in accordance with the established procedure, submit proposals to the Ministry of Labor and Social Policy of Ukraine on the issues of formation of the state pension policy and control the implementation of official legislative acts.

Activities of the Pension Fund of Ukraine are subordinated and coordinated by the Cabinet of Ministers of Ukraine through the Ministry of Social Policy of Ukraine.

== Pension reform ==
The implementation of pension reform proceeds through the gradual introduction of a three-tier pension system:

- The first tier is a Solidarity system
- The send tier is Mandatory Accumulation System
- The third tier is Voluntary Non-State Pension Savings System

The main objectives of the pension reform are:

- to raise the living standards of pensioners;
- to establish the dependence of the size of pensions on the numbers such as earnings and length of service;
- to ensure the financial stability of the pension system;
- to encourage citizens to save money on old age;
- to create a more efficient and effective system of administrative management in pension provision.

The three-tier pension system will allow the distribution of the three components of the risk associated with changes in the demographic situation (which is more sensitive to the solidarity system) and fluctuations in the economy and in the capital market (which is more experienced by the accumulation system). Such risk-republican sharing will make the pension system more financially balanced and sustainable, which will protect employees from lowering the total income after retirement.

== Chronology ==
- December 1990. The Ukrainian Republican Department of the Pension Fund was established.
- February 1991. The regional authorities of the Pension Fund have been formed.
- December 1991. The pensions were financed from the Pension Fund, and not from the state budget for the first time.
- January 1992. A Pension Fund of Ukraine was created. It was formed on the basis of the Ukrainian Republican branch of the Pension Fund of Ukraine. The administrations were established in the Autonomous Republic of Crimea, oblasts, cities of Kyiv and Sevastopol, approved the Pension Fund Regulations. The social insurance contribution rate was set at 61% of the wage fund.
- April 1992. The contribution rate for insurance of employer is reduced to 37% of individual salary
- October 1992. The administrative liability has been introduced for non-payment of insurance premiums to the Pension Fund.
- July 1993. The basis for calculating contributions to the Pension Fund was arranged.
- December 1993. The Joint-Stock Post-Pension Bank Aval was created. Its aims were creation conditions for reducing the period of circulation of pension funds and ensuring their timely payment with the participation of the Pension Fund.
- June 1994. A new act of the Pension Fund of Ukraine was approved. The rayon and city departments of the Pension Fund were created.
- October 1995. The obligatory registration was introduced for payers of insurance contributions to the pension fund.
- February 1996. The payment of insurance premiums was attached to the time of salary payment.
- March 1996. The Directories was created at the Regional Administrations of the foundation.
- April 1997. A work of creation of legislation on pension reform was begun.
- July 1997. The Law of Ukraine "On the Collection for Compulsory State Pension Insurance" was adopted. The contribution rate was set at 32% of individual salary.
- September 1997. The Cabinet of Ministers of Ukraine allowed the agricultural commodity producer to repay the debt of payment of the compulsory state pension insurance by-products of own production.
- January 1998. The president's decree introduced the bank's judicial responsibility for the payment of wages without deductions to the Pension Fund.
- April 1998. The president's decree approved the Basic Directions of Reforming Pension Provision.
- May 1998. It was planned to create a plan for phased introduction (1998-2000) of automated personalized accounting of information in the system of compulsory State pension insurance.
- July 1998. With the consent of pensioners, the payments of pensions were introduced through institutions of banks.
- July 1998. A minimum was set on the amount of income for paying a contribution to the Pension Fund.
- August 1998. A new special department of the Pension Fund was formed. Its functions related to the sale of goods (services), property, property rights for the collection of compulsory state pension insurance.
- October 1998. In the Law of Ukraine "On the Collection for Compulsory State Pension Insurance" the contribution rates were introduced:
  - from the operation on buying and selling currencies;
  - jewelry;
  - alienation of cars
- The 1999 year. An experiment has been launched to set the pensions by the Pension Fund authorities in the Lviv region. In five rayons of Lviv Oblast, a pilot implementation of personalized accounting information in the system of compulsory state pension insurance was conducted.
- September 2000 year. The arrears of payment of pensions were repaid
- October 2000 year. The implementation of personalized accounting information was complete all over Ukraine
- January 2001. The pension fund's experiment on pensions has been extended to Crimea, Dnipropetrovsk, Donetsk, Zakarpattia, Kyiv, Lviv, Nikolayev, Poltava, Kharkiv and Khmelnytskyi oblasts. The fund's directions were established in these cities.
- March 2001. The Pension Fund started to register insured persons, keep the information system about the insured persons, control over the completeness and timely collection of the compulsory social insurance against unemployment in Zaporizhzhya, Luhansk and Lviv regions.
- October 2001. The President of Ukraine proposes "Main directions of reforming the pension system of Ukraine" to the Verkhovna Rada of Ukraine and the Cabinet of Ministers of Ukraine.
- November 2001. The Verkhovna Rada of Ukraine adopted in the first reading the Draft Law "On Compulsory State Pension Insurance" and "On Non-State Pension Provision".
- January 2002. The Pension Fund bodies started to carry out the appointment of pensions and the issuance of documents for their payment
- June 2002. The journal "Herald of the Pension Fund of Ukraine" was founded.
- July 2002. The Directorates of the Pension Fund have been created in the Autonomous Republic of Crimea, oblasts, cities of Kyiv and Sevastopol.
- July 2002. From the 1st of July the appointment of pensions carried out taking into account the personified accounting information in the system of compulsory State pension insurance
- September 2002. Since September 2002, an experiment carried out with the use of personified accounting information in the system of compulsory State pension insurance for the purpose of appointment of insurance payments, State assistance to families with children, State social assistance to low-income families and housing subsidies in Gulyaipilsky and Pologivsky districts of Zaporizhzhia oblast, in the cities of Sverdlovsk and Severodonetsk Luhansk region, in the Sokal and Zhydachiv regions of the Lviv Oblast
- March 2003. The newspaper "Pensioner Courier" was established.
- June 2003. The Verkhovna Rada of Ukraine adopted in the second reading a Draft Law "On Compulsory State Pension Insurance".
- July 2003. The Verkhovna Rada of Ukraine adopted the Law of Ukraine "On Compulsory State Pension Insurance"
- July – December 2003. Preparation for the implementation of the Law was conducted
- November 2003. The Training and Methodological Center was established on the basis of the Specialized State Direst of the Pension Fund of Ukraine. An agreement on cooperation was signed between the Pension Fund and the Federation of Trade Unions of Ukraine.
- January 2004. The Law of Ukraine "On Compulsory State Pension Insurance" started to implement. Recalculations of pensions have been made in accordance with the new pension legislation. An agreement on cooperation was signed between the Pension Fund and the Federation of Employers of Ukraine.
- March 2004. Dated 31.03.2004 No. 418 "On the Members of the Board of the Pension Fund" the Cabinet of Ministers Resolution was adopted.
- July 2004. The Cabinet of Ministers Resolution No. 479-r of July 13, 2004, approved the plan of measures for the creation of a cumulative system of compulsory State pension insurance for 2004-2007.
- September 2004. Dated September 18, 2004, No. 1215 "On raising the level of pensions for citizens" The Cabinet of Ministers Resolution was adopted. If pensions monthly amount did not reach the subsistence minimum (2004) established for those who have lost their ability to work, a monthly state targeted pension aid (grant) would be paid equal to the amount that is insufficient to the specified subsistence minimum.
- January 2005. The Law of Ukraine No. 2291-IV of 23.12.2004 "Amendments to the Law of Ukraine" On Compulsory State Pension Insurance "came into force. The minimum insurance period for receiving old-age pension is set 25 years for men and 20 years for women. It was equal to the amount of the subsistence minimum for persons who have lost their ability to work. For each year over 25 years for men and 20 for women the old-age pension increases by 1 percent of the minimum age-based pension.
- April 2005. Dated 20.04.2005 No. 679 "Issues of the Ministry of Labor and Social Policy of Ukraine" The president of Ukraine decree introduced the direction and coordination of the activities of the Pension Fund of Ukraine by the minister of labor and social policy of Ukraine.
- September 2005. In order to create the proper conditions for the introduction of a cumulative system of compulsory state pension insurance in the Sokal and Zhidachiv districts of the Lviv region, an experiment was carried out on the creation of an automated system of the Accumulative Fund of the Compulsory State Pension.
- December 2005. The Cabinet of Ministers Resolution approved the Strategy for the Development of the Pension System, aimed at ensuring its financial stability and strengthening the insurance principles in the solidarity system.
- November 2006. In accordance with the Resolution of the Cabinet of Ministers of Ukraine dated November 2, 2006, No. 1522, functions of appointment and payment of pensions from the Ministry of Defense, Ministry of Internal Affairs, Ministry for Emergencies, SSU, State Tax Administration, State Department for the Execution of Punishments and other bodies were transferred to the Pension Fund.
- December 2006. By the Law of Ukraine of December 19, 2006, No. 489-V "On the State Budget of Ukraine for 2007" the functions of appointment and payment of military pensions and monthly lifetime maintenance of retirement judges were transferred to the Pension Fund.
- October 2007 year. The Cabinet of Ministers Resolution dated October 24, 2007, No. 1261 approved the Regulations "About the Pension Fund of Ukraine".
- January 2008 year. Converted pensions were calculated with the use of indicators of average wages of workers employed in the branches of economy of Ukraine for 2002-2005, taking into account the average wage index of workers employed in the branches of the economy Ukraine and in connection with the change in the assessment of one year of insurance experience in the joint-stock system by 1.2%.
- October 2008. Recalculation of pensions carried out in connection with the change in the definition of one-year insurance experience in the joint-stock system by 1.35%
- October 2017. The Verkhovna Rada approved Pension Reform Bill No. 6, “Amendments to Certain Legislative Acts of Ukraine Regarding Pensions", which was adopted at the second reading.
- In 2018, the Pension Fund predicts an increase in revenues from the single social contribution by 35% to 213.463 billion UAN.

== Authority ==
The current president of the Pension Fund of Ukraine is Evgeny V. Kapinus.

== See also ==
- Pension
- Pensions in Ukraine
- Pension fund
