= Nina Karpachova =

Ukrainian lawyer and politician

- Ніна Карпачова
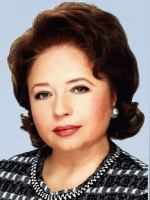
- Official portrait, 2006

People's Deputy of Ukraine
- In office 25 May 2006 – 8 February 2007
- Succeeded by: Valeriya Lutkovska
- Constituency: Party of Regions, No. 2
- In office 11 May 1994 – 14 April 1998
- Preceded by: Constituency established
- Succeeded by: Constituency abolished
- Constituency: Autonomous Republic of Crimea, No. 28

Personal details
- Born: Nina Ivanivna Karpachova; 12 August 1957 (age 69) Ceadîr-Lunga, Moldavian SSR, Soviet Union (now Moldova)
- Party: Independent
- Other political affiliations: KPU (until 1991); Party of Regions
- Education: Kyiv University
- Occupation: politician, administrator

Nina Ivanivna Karpachova (Ukrainian: Ніна Іванівна Карпачова; born 12 August 1957) is a Ukrainian lawyer and politician. She was the Verkhovna Rada Commissioner for Human Rights from 1998 until 2012.

== Early life and career ==
Karpachova attended Kyiv University and completed a post-graduate course of the Academy of Social Sciences in Moscow (1991).

== Political career ==
=== Election ===
She was elected a deputy in the Ukrainian Verkhovna Rada (Ukraine's parliament) in 1994 for the 28th single-member electoral district in the Autonomous Republic of Crimea as independent, representing Alushta.

=== Human rights ===
Soon after her election, she was appointed deputy head of Verkhovna Rada committee for human rights, national minorities and international relations. Karpachova has been active in adopting international human rights standards into national legislation.

Karpachova has headed a number of governmental and parliamentary delegations of Ukraine at international and European conferences on human rights issues. In 1995, she coordinated parliamentary hearings for Ukraine's ratification process of the United Nations Convention on the Elimination of All Forms of Discrimination Against Women. On her initiative the National Centre of the Adoption of Orphan Children was established in 1996 under the Ministry of Education.

=== Legislation ===
Karpachova is the author of four draft laws adopted by the Verkhovna Rada:

- Adoption of Orphan Children (part of the Marriage and Family Code)
- Judicial Procedure of the Adoption of Orphan Children (part of the Civil Procedure Code)
- Law on the Verkhovna Rada Commissioner for Human Rights
- Article 1241 of Criminal Code, establishing criminal liability for trafficking in human beings

=== Other posts ===
From 1996 to 1998, Karpachova was vice-president of the World Congress of Ukrainian Lawyers, when she was appointed the first Verkhovna Rada Commissioner for Human Rights. In 1999, she also was named head of the National Coordination Council for the Prevention of Human Trafficking. She became a member of the European Ombudsman Institute in 1999 and the International Ombudsman Institute in 2000.

== Influence ==
Karpachova is one of the most influential woman in Ukraine according to the Ukrainian magazine Focus. She placed among the top 10 most influential women in 2006, 2009, and 2010.

Political offices
New office	Ombudsman of Ukraine; 1998–2012	Succeeded by Valeriya Lutkovska
