= Ombudsman in Ukraine =

Office of commissioned representative who performs functions of ombudsman

Ombudsman in Ukraine (Ukrainian: Уповноважений/Уповноважена, romanized: Upovnovazhenyi/Upovnovazhena, lit. 'plenipotentiary') is an office of commissioned representative who performs functions of ombudsman. Besides the parliamentary ombudsman, there are several presidential commissioners.

== List of ombudsmen positions in Ukraine ==
- Verkhovna Rada Human Rights Ombudsman (Ukrainian: Уповноважений Верховної Ради України з прав людини), 1998
- Presidential Ombudsman of Children Rights (Ukrainian: Уповноважений Президента України з прав дитини), 2011
- Presidential Ombudsman in Crimean Tatars Affairs (Ukrainian: Уповноважений Президента України у справах кримськотатарського народу), 2014
- Presidential Ombudsman in Health Rehabilitation of participants of ATO (Ukrainian: Уповноважений Президента України з питань реабілітації учасників бойових дій), 2018
- Presidential Ombudsman of Handicapped People Rights
- Governmental Ombudsman in Education (Ukrainian: Освітній омбудсмен), 2017
- Business Ombudsman
- Language Ombudsman, officially State Language Protection Commissioner, 2019

== Verkhovna Rada Human Rights Ombudsmen ==
- Nina Karpachova (1998–2012)
- Valeriya Lutkovska (2012–2017)
- Lyudmila Denisova (2018–2022)
- Dmytro Lubinets (2022–present)

== Presidential Ombudsman in Health Rehabilitation of participants of ATO ==
- Vadym Svyrydenko

== Presidential Ombudsmen in Children Rights ==
- Yuriy Pavlenko
- Mykola Kuleba

== Presidential Ombudsman in Crimean Tatars Affairs ==
- Mustafa Dzhemilev

== Governmental Ombudsman in Education ==
- appointment is anticipated in 2019

== Business Ombudsman ==
- Algirdas Šemeta
