= Yuriy Kralov =

Ukrainian Economist

chairman of the board of MTB BANK PJSC
- Incumbent
- Assumed office July 2017

Personal details
- Born: 18 October 1976 (age 49) Odesa, Odesa oblast, Ukraine SSR
- Education: Odesa National Polytechnic University

Yuriy Kralov (Russian: Юрий Александрович Кралов) is a Ukrainian economist and co-owner and chairman of the Ukrainian MTB BANK.

== Education ==
Yuriy Kralov graduated from Odesa National Polytechnic University with a degree in Production Management in 1998.

== Career ==
He joined the Marine Transport Bank, where he became Head of the Commercial Department on 8 January 1998.

Yuriy Kralov became deputy chairman of the board for Corporate Business on 28 March 2005. The Cypriot Marfin Popular Bank Public Co LTD bought the Marine Transport Bank in 2007 and renamed it into Marfin Bank PJSC in 2010. The Cypriots sold the bank to Ukrainian investors, and the institution was renamed into Public Joint Stock Company MTB BANK in June 2017.

All this time Yuriy Kralov had been deputy chairman of the board. He became chairman of the Board of PJSC MTB BANK on 23 October 2017.

== Sponsorship ==
Yuriy Kralov took part in organization of exhibitions in Odesa of such artists: Polina Zinovieva, Tetyana Popovychenko, Andriy Kovalenko, Petro Nahulyak, Olga Kotova, Volodymyr Dudnyk, Vitaliy Parastyuk.

He initiated providing financial assistance to the Odesa National Academic Opera and Ballet Theater and supported MTB BANK's joining Board of Trustees of the theater.

Under the leadership of Yuri Kralov, MTB BANK sponsored international tennis tournaments, the annual cruising yacht regatta Black Sea Cup and the Black Sea Ports Cup, and the participation of Ukrainian athletes in international motocross competitions.

With the active support of Yuri Kralov MTB BANK became a partner of Veres football team and took part in the first sports IPO on the Ukrainian stock exchange PFTS.
