= Valeriya Lutkovska =

Ukrainian lawyer

- Валерія Лутковська
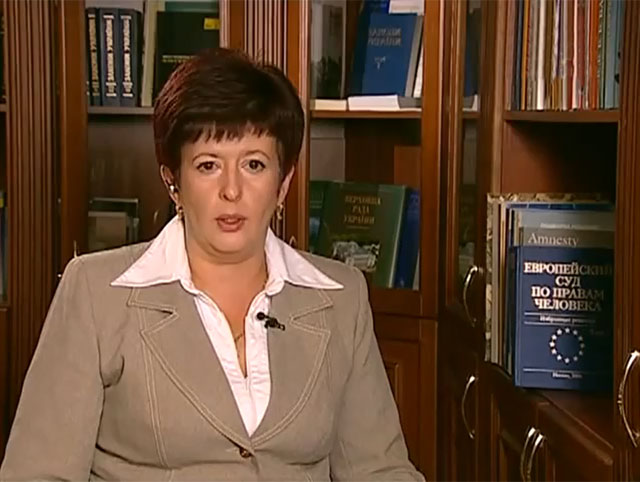

2nd Ombudsman of Ukraine
- In office 27 April 2012 – 28 April 2017
- President: Viktor Yanukovych; Oleksandr Turchynov; Petro Poroshenko
- Preceded by: Nina Karpachova
- Succeeded by: Lyudmyla Denisova

Personal details
- Born: 20 January 1972 (age 54) Kyiv, Ukrainian SSR, Soviet Union (now Ukraine)
- Education: National Academy of Internal Affairs (1999); Kyiv National Taras Shevchenko University (1993)
- Occupation: Jurist

Valeriya Volodymyrivna Lutkovska (Ukrainian: Валерія Володимирівна Лутковська; born 20 January 1972) is a Ukrainian lawyer who was Ombudsman of Ukraine from April 2012 until April 2017.

== Early life and education ==
Lutkovska was born on 20 January 1972 in Kyiv. In 1993, she graduated from Taras Shevchenko National University of Kyiv, having studied philology and Russian language and literature. In 1999, she completed a specialist degree in law (jurist) at the National Academy of Internal Affairs of Ukraine.

== Career ==
August 1994, Lutkovska began teaching German and Russian languages and foreign literature at Kyiv High School 149. A year later, she became the chief consultant for the International Legal Cooperation Department at the Ministry of Justice of Ukraine. In October 1996, she became the deputy head of the Department for International Relations at Ukraine's Ministry of Family and Youth.

From October 1997 to September 2003, Lutkovska worked as the Deputy Head of Unit for International Legal Assistance and Cooperation of Department for International Legal Activity; Deputy Head of Department for International Cooperation and Legal Assistance; First Deputy Head of the International Law Department; Deputy Head, Head of the National Bureau of the Observance of the Convention for the Protection of Human Rights and Fundamental Freedoms; Commissioner for the Observance of the Convention for the Protection of Human Rights and Fundamental Freedoms, Ministry of Justice of Ukraine.

From September 2003 to December 2005, she served as a Deputy Minister of Justice of Ukraine; Commissioner for the Observance of the Convention for the Protection of Human Rights and Fundamental Freedoms, Ministry of Justice of Ukraine. She then became the Deputy Director on issues of judicial defence at the law firm “Lavrynovych & Partners” until November 2006, when she was again named a Deputy Minister of Justice. From January 2011 to April 2012, she was a government agent before the European Court of Human Rights.

In April 2012, the Verkhovna Rada appointed Lutkovska to the position of the Ukrainian Parliament Commissioner for Human Rights. She assumed office on 27 April 2012, taking her oath at the plenary session of the Verkhovna Rada. Her term ended on 28 April 2017. In March 2018 Lutkovska was succeeded as Commissioner by Lyudmyla Denisova.

=== Awards and honorary titles ===
12.2000 – Certificate of Merit of the Ministry of Justice of Ukraine

12.2004 – Order of Princess Olga, 3rd Class

Honored Jurist of Ukraine.

Political offices
Preceded by Nina Karpachova	Ombudsman of Ukraine; 2012–2018	Succeeded by Lyudmila Denisova
