= Dmytro Lubinets =

Ukrainian politician (born 1981)

- Дмитро Лубінець
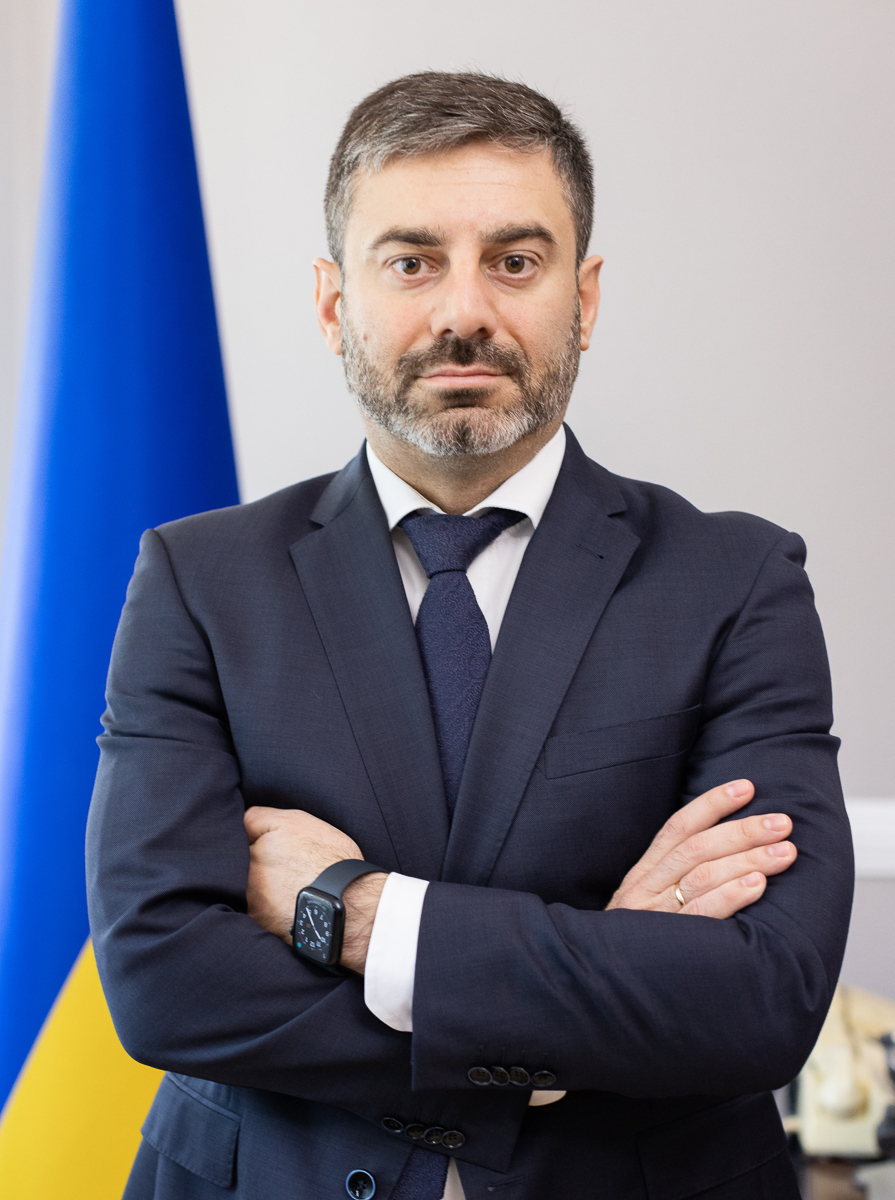
- Official potarit of Lubinets

4th Ukrainian Parliamentary Commissioner for Human Rights
- Incumbent
- Assumed office 1 July 2022
- President: Volodymyr Zelenskyy
- Prime Minister: Denys Shmyhal; Yulia Svyrydenko
- Preceded by: Liudmyla Denisova

People's Deputy of Ukraine (60th electoral district, Donetsk Oblast)
- In office 27 November 2014 – 29 August 2019
- In office 29 August 2019 – 1 July 2022

Personal details
- Born: 4 July 1981 (age 45) Volnovakha, Donetsk Oblast, Ukrainian SSR, Soviet Union (now Ukraine)
- Party: For the Future
- Other political affiliations: Front for Change (2010-2013); European Solidarity (2014–2019)
- Spouse: Yanyna Lubinets
- Children: 2 (Danylo & Valeriya)
- Education: Donetsk National University
- Occupation: Jurist

Dmytro Valeriyovych Lubinets (Ukrainian: Дмитро Валерійович Лубінець; born 4 July 1981) is a Ukrainian politician and jurist, who is currently serving as the 4th Ombudsman of Ukraine. He has been a Member of the Ukrainian parliament since 2014, and was re-elected during 2019 Ukrainian parliamentary election.

== Early life and education ==
Lubinets was born and raised in Volnovakha, a city located in the eastern Ukrainian Donbas region. Between 1998 and 2003, he studied international relations at the Donetsk National University. In 2013, he graduated from the Yaroslav Mudryi University in Kharkiv in the field of law. Following his graduation, he worked as a lawyer.

== Political career ==
In 2010, Lubinets was elected into the Volnovkha City Council, representing Arseniy Yatsenyuk's Front for Change party. In 2014, he was elected as member of the Ukrainian parliament as a deputy for the European Solidarity party, representing his native electoral district in the Donetsk Oblast. During the 2019 Ukrainian parliamentary election, he again won the single-mandate constituency of his hometown in Donbas after running as an independent candidate. Following his re-election, he joined the "For the Future" parliamentary group.

Between 2019 and 2022, he was the chairman of the Verkhovna Rada Committee for Human Rights and the Reintergration of the Russian-occupied Donetsk, Luhansk Oblasts and the Autonomous Republic of Crimea and Sevastopol.

On 1 July 2022, he was appointed as the Ukrainian Parliament Commissioner for Human Rights, after receiving the votes of 250 deputies.

== Personal life ==
He is married and father of two children.
