= Oleksandra Lukyanenko =

Soviet-Ukrainian politician (1938–1993)

Oleksandra Mykhailivna Lukyanenko (Ukrainian: Олександра Михайлівна Лук'яненко; 28 January 1938 – 12 June 1993) was a Soviet and Ukrainian medic and politician.

== Early life and education ==
Lukyanenko was born in Shevchenkove (presently known as Dolynska). She studied at Dnipro State Medical Institute and graduated in 1961.

== Political career ==
Lukyanenko was a member of the Communist Party of the Soviet Union since 1961.

From 1961 to 1970, she served as the head of the health care department at the Dzerzhynskyi District Executive Committee of Kryvyi Rih and as the chief physician at the 2nd Hospital in Kryvyi Rih, Dnipro Oblast.

Between 1970 and 1973, she was the department head and deputy head of the Department for Medical Work of the 4th Main Directorate of the Ministry of Health of the Ukrainian SSR.

From February 1973 to April 1974, she served as Deputy Minister of Social Security of the Ukrainian PCP. From April 1974 to March 1979, she was the First Deputy Minister of Social Security of the Ukrainian PCP.

She also held the position of Minister of Social Security of the Ukrainian PCP from March 19, 1979 until September 17, 1991.

== Publications ==
She is the author of more than 30 scientific works, including three monographs "Rheumatic heart disease in pregnant women" (1968), "Rehabilitation and medical and labor examination in uterine fibroids" (1981), "Problems of examination of rehabilitation and employment of disabled people" (1982).

== Death ==
Lukyanenko died in Kyiv at the age of 55.
