= List of Ukrainian oblasts and territories by average monthly gross salary =

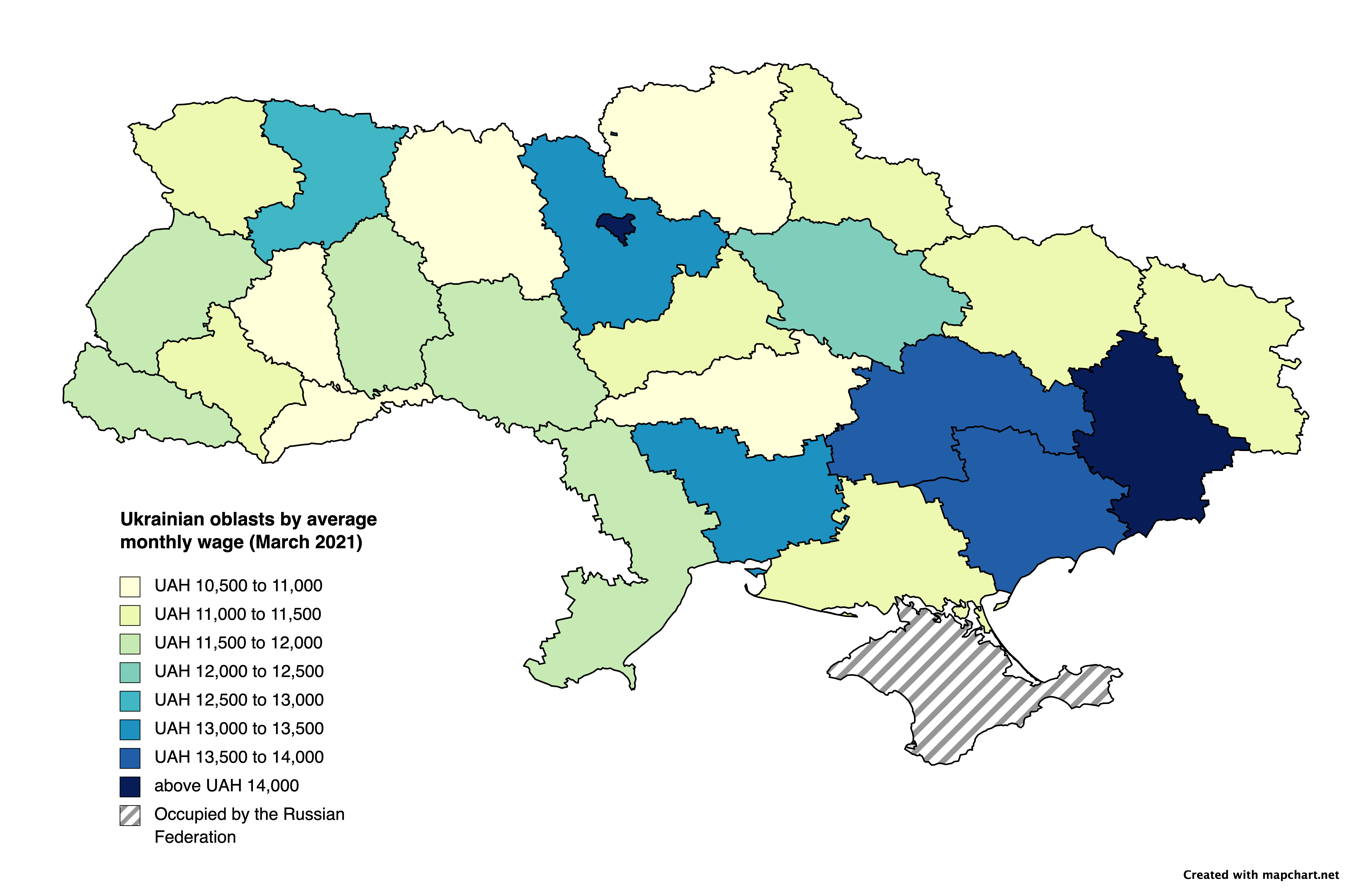
A map of Ukrainian oblasts by average monthly gross salary

Figures all precede the 2022 Russian invasion of Ukraine.

Region	Average Monthly Wage (UAH) Dec 2009	Average Monthly Wage (UAH) Jul 2013	Average Monthly Wage (UAH) Jul 2017	Average Monthly Wage (UAH) Mar 2021	Rank
Kyiv City	3 684	5 238	11 412	20 132	1
Donetsk Oblast*	2 436	3 901	7 877	15 907	2
Dnipropetrovsk Oblast	2 233	3 459	7 305	13 677	3
Zaporizhzhia Oblast	2 105	3 287	7 242	13 721	4
Mykolaiv Oblast	2 174	3 242	6 822	13 462	5
Kyiv Oblast	2 322	3 474	7 407	13 438	6
Rivne Oblast	1 984	3 026	6 219	12 879	7
Poltava Oblast	2 053	3 182	6 774	12 404	8
Lviv Oblast	1 944	2 962	6 563	11 937	9
Khmelnytskyi Oblast	1 807	2 816	6 068	11 892	10
Odesa Oblast	2 317	3 041	6 691	11 889	11
Vinnytsia Oblast	1 784	2 885	6 552	11 696	12
Zakarpattia Oblast	1 915	2 729	6 504	11 538	13
Ivano-Frankivsk Oblast	1 808	2 901	6 297	11 493	14
Cherkasy Oblast	1 768	2 868	6 447	11 462	15
Kherson Oblast	1 744	2 593	6 016	11 319	16
Kharkiv Oblast	2 130	3 122	6 449	11 313	17
Luhansk Oblast*	2 142	3 497	5 868	11 259	18
Volyn Oblast	1 654	2 788	6 001	11 031	19
Sumy Oblast	1 857	2 925	6 291	11 016	20
Ternopil Oblast	1 695	2 505	5 678	10 973	21
Chernivtsi Oblast	1 816	2 635	5 845	10 861	22
Chernihiv Oblast	1 636	2 656	5 834	10 722	23
Kirovohrad Oblast	1 833	2 809	6 090	10 706	24
Zhytomyr Oblast	1 787	2 760	6 085	10 675	25
Sevastopol City (annexed by Russia in 2014)	2 328	3 110	n/a	n/a	n/a
Crimea (annexed by Russia in 2014)	2 027	2 991	n/a	n/a	n/a
Ukraine	2 233	3 429	7 339	13 612	

* - Figures for Donetsk and Luhansk Oblast exclude occupied territories.

== See also ==
- Pensions in Ukraine
- Unemployment benefits in Ukraine
