= List of Ukrainian regions by Human Development Index =

This is a list of regions of Ukraine by Human Development Index as of 2023.

HDI of Ukrainian regions in 2017.

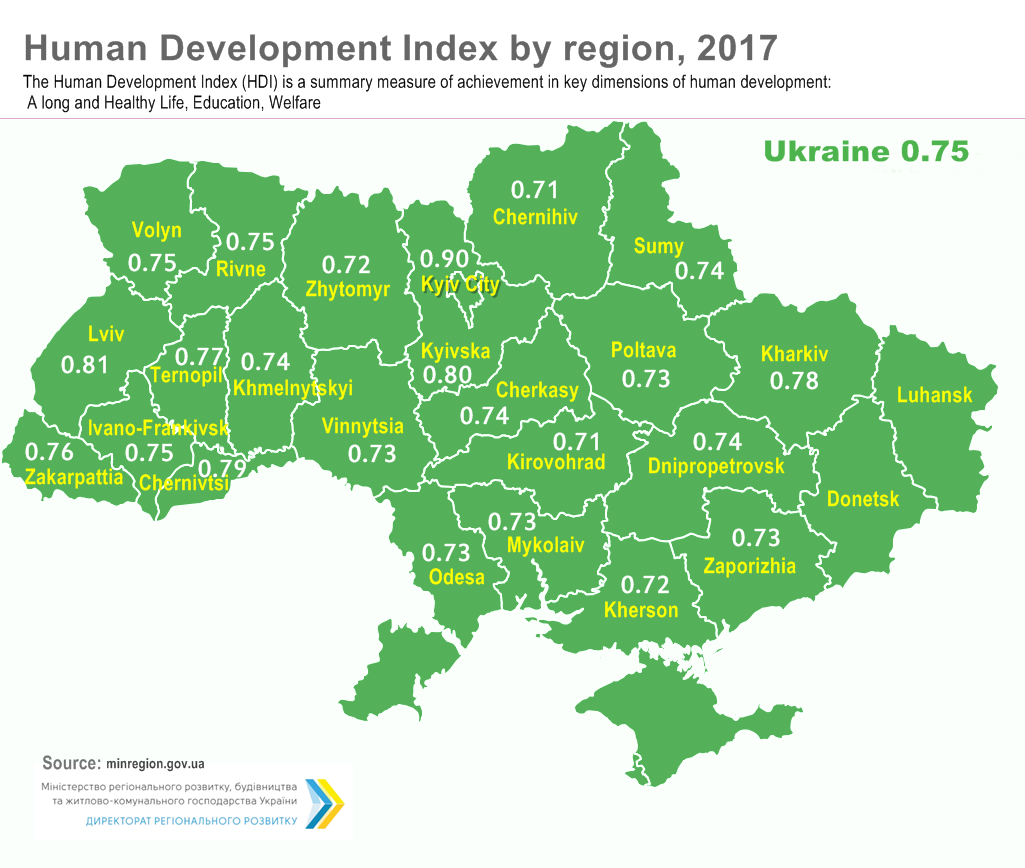
Oblast HDI in 2017. The three original Russian-occupied territories of Ukraine had no data.

Rank	Region	HDI (2023)
High human development
1	Eastern Ukraine	0.785
2	Southern Ukraine	0.784
3	Northern Ukraine	0.781
–	Ukraine	0.779
4	Central Ukraine	0.771
5	Western Ukraine	0.766
