= Pensions in Ukraine =

Pensions in Ukraine provide income for retirees in Ukraine. They are provided pursuant to the Law of Ukraine on Compulsory State Pension Insurance (statements of the Ukrainian Supreme Council, 2003, No. 49–51, art. 376) that specifies a three-tiered pension provision system.

== System ==
Ukraine's pension operates with three tiers:

=== First tier ===
This level is based on solidarity and subsidizing principles. Within this framework, pensions are assigned when reaching age 60 for men and 58.5 for women, on disability, or on loss of the breadwinner. This system is funded by employees, entrepreneurs, the self-employed, and others who are obliged to contribute to the state pension insurance. This payment amounts to 22% of salary, which is paid either by the individual or by the employer. The contribution is received by the Pension Fund of Ukraine, an authority that is responsible for the state pension. The Pension Fund uses contributions to pay pensions of current retirees. Such a system does not ensure that current contributors get paid when they retire. The Pension Fund is operated on a pay-as-you-go basis, in which current contributions fund current pensions. The situation is expected to worsen as retirees increase from 23.5% to 27.8% of total population by 2050.

=== Second tier ===
The second level is represented by an accumulation system of compulsory insurance. It accumulates funds in the accounts of State Accumulative Fund of Ukraine or non-governmental accounts. Contributions are held in personal accounts for contributors. The contributions will be invested on the contributor's behalf. The amount of contribution was not to exceed 7% of salary. The accumulated funds are available upon retirement. Retirement savings can be inherited and are in addition to the solidarity system. Administrative support is provided by the Pension Fund of Ukraine.

=== Third tier ===
The last system is based on voluntary contributions to non-governmental pension funds and is codified in the Law on Non-governmental Pension Provision, enacted on 1 January 2004. Non-governmental funds are legal entities established under the Law of Ukraine "On private pension provision". They have the same operating principle as governmental pension funds in the second tier system and are operated as non-profit organizations. The pension fund creates an account in the name of the participant and accumulates contributions either from the individual, his or her employer or the participant's family. Participants of this system do not lose the right to compulsory state pension payments and are entitled to set their retirement age. Contributions to those funds and received investment income on it receive tax relief.

== Reform of 2017 ==
On 3 October 2017, the Verkhovna Rada voted on legislation to overhaul the pension system and on 8 October Ukraine's President Petro Poroshenko signed this law. Amendments were driven by factors such as low pension levels, as 8 million of the approximately 12 were receiving the minimum pension of ₴1,312 (€32) while medium pensions amounted to ₴1,886 (€50), compared to the price of a consumer basket ₴2,550 (€81) that exceeds minimal pension, the significant deficit of Ukraine's Pension Fund and the need of modernization. The reform was an IMF requirement for receiving a US$8.4 billion loan.

=== Changes ===
On 1 October 2017 the minimum wage was raised to ₴1,452 (€46). The reform foresaw a rise in pensions for 9 million pensioners with an average increase of ₴700 (€20). Ukraine's pension calculation depends on salary, qualifying period and average salary. This created significant differences based on the year of retirement. Average salary rises year to year implying that pensions should also be adjusted. The last time such modernization had been made was in 2012, using the average salary rate of 2007. In recent years, the average salary has grown threefold, while pensions have grown much less.

The next amendment applied to the automatic pension adjustments that reflect the increase in average salary and inflation. Annual pension adjustments reflect increases in average salary, 50% of the growth in average salary for the three prior years and 50% by the increase in the consumer price index for the previous year.

From 1 October 2017 still-working pensioners started to receive the full pension amount, ending the previous regulation under which the state withheld 15% of the salary. No contributions came from the salary of working pensioners as was the case before the reform was introduced.

The official retirement age was not changed, but requirements for the qualifying period did change. The original 15 year qualifying period was extended in 2018 to 25 with further increases until 2028 when it reaches 35 years. Retirees are to be allocated into 3 groups—60, 63 and 65 years. The older the person, the fewer the requirements.

Changes were introduced for public servants, judges, prosecutors, educators receiving special pensions. They lost the right to retire due to their age and their pension calculations receive no priority. Only military staff are eligible for "long-term-service" pensions.

== Disparities ==
Pension expenditures in 2017 amounted to ₴284 billion. representing approximately one-third of total spending. The government covered ₴141 billion of pension spending while the rest was funded by Single Social Contribution.

Capital residents received the highest average pension in 2017, ₴2,408.02, while the lowest was in Sumy Oblast, at ₴1,560.95.

Nearly half of retirees (5.6 million) received the minimal pension.

Pensions of public servants, judges, prosecutors, and educators received multiples of the average. According to the State Statistic Service, payments over ₴10,000 (€312) were received by only 15.5 thousand pensioners.

Six million workers pay Single Social Contribution from which 12 million pensions are funded, which means that each contributor supports two retirees.

== See also ==
- List of Ukrainian oblasts and territories by salary
- Unemployment benefits in Ukraine
