= Ministry of Social Policy of Ukraine =

Government ministry of Ukraine

Ministry of Social Policy
- Міністерство соціальної політики Ministerstvo sotsialnoi polityky Ukrainy
- Coat of arms of Ukraine

Agency overview
- Formed: 9 December 2010
- Preceding agency: Ministry of Labor and Social Policy
- Jurisdiction: Government of Ukraine
- Headquarters: 8/10, Esplanadna street, Kyiv, Ukraine, 01001
- Minister responsible: Denys Uliutin, Minister of Social Policy, Family and National Unity of Ukraine
- Child agencies: State Service for disabled and veterans of Ukraine; State Labor Inspection; Pension Fund of Ukraine
- Website: www.msp.gov.ua/en/

The Ministry of Social Policy of Ukraine (Ukrainian: Міністерство соціальної політики України, romanized: Ministerstvo sotsialnoi polityky Ukrainy), formerly the Ministry of Labor and Social Policy, is the Ukrainian government department responsible for instituting labor relations, family and children, immigration and trafficking, women's rights, children's rights, and humanitarian aid.

== Specialization ==
- Population Employment and Labor Migration
- Work Relationships
- Populations Social Security
- Family and Children Affairs
- Rights Security of the Deported by National Identity People which returned to Ukraine
- Ensuring the equal rights and possibilities for women and men
- Prevention of violence in family

== Structures ==
The ministry consists of the central body of ministry headed by its leadership composed of a minister, his/hers first deputy, and other deputies in assistance to the minister. Part of ministry compose several state administrations that are specialized in certain field and coordinate operations of government companies.

On 16 July 2025 the Ministry of National Unity of Ukraine was merged with the Ministry of Social Policy of Ukraine.

=== State agencies ===
- State Service for disabled and veterans of Ukraine
- State Inspection of Ukraine in labor affairs
- State Employment Service

System of State Social Security

- State Social Security Fund in case of Unemployment
- Social Security Fund for temporary Disability
- Social Security Fund for industrial Accidents
- Pension Fund of Ukraine

== List of ministers ==
Soviet Ukraine

Name of ministry	Name of minister	Term of office	
Name of ministry	Name of minister	Start	End
Ministry of Social Security	Yuriy Lapchinskiy	1918	1918
Ministry of Social Security		1918	1920
Ministry of Social Security	Nikolai Glebov-Avilov	9 May 1920	29 May 1920
Ministry of Social Security	Boris Eltsin	1920	1921
Ministry of Social Security	Varvara Moyrova	1921	1922
Ministry of Social Security	Ilya Korneyev	1922	1923
Ministry of Social Security	Karl Einstein	1923	1924
Ministry of Social Security	Jacob Poznanski	March 1924	July 1926
Ministry of Social Security	Hryhoriy Pokornyi	July 1926	29 May 1934
Ministry of Social Security	Ivan Slynko	29 May 1934	1936
Ministry of Social Security	Ivan Kudrin	14 March 1936	August 1937
Ministry of Social Security		August 1937	June 1938
Ministry of Social Security	Yevdokia Lehur	June 1938	15 February 1945
Ministry of Social Security	Vladimir Muratov	15 February 1945	25 October 1946
Ministry of Social Security	Fedir Ananchenko	25 October 1946	11 December 1956
Ministry of Social Security		11 December 1956	May 1957
Ministry of Social Security	Oleksiy Fedorov	May 1957	19 March 1979
Ministry of Social Security	Oleksandra Lukyanenko	19 March 1979	17 September 1991

Ukraine

Name of ministry	Name of minister	Term of office	
Name of ministry	Name of minister	Start	End
Arkadiy Yershov	17 September 1991	28 August 1996	
Petro Ovcharenko	28 August 1996	29 July 1997	
Ministry of Labor and Social Policy	Mykola Bilobotsky	July 1997	June 1998
Ministry of Labor and Social Policy	Ivan Sakhan	June 25, 1998	November 30, 2002
Ministry of Labor and Social Policy	Mykhailo Papiev	November 30, 2002	February 3, 2005
Ministry of Labor and Social Policy	Viacheslav Kyrylenko	February 4, 2005	September 27, 2005
Ministry of Labor and Social Policy	Ivan Sakhan	September 27, 2005	August 4, 2006
Ministry of Labor and Social Policy	Mykhailo Papiev	August 4, 2006	December 18, 2007
Ministry of Labor and Social Policy	Lyudmyla Denisova	December 18, 2007	March 11, 2010
Ministry of Labor and Social Policy	Vasyl Nadraha	March 11, 2010	December 9, 2010
Ministry of Social Policy	Serhiy Tihipko	December 9, 2010	December 24, 2012
Ministry of Social Policy	Natalia Korolevska	December 24, 2012	'February 24, 2014
Ministry of Social Policy	Lyudmyla Denisova	February 27, 2014	December 2, 2014
Ministry of Social Policy	Pavlo Rozenko	December 2, 2014	14 April 2016
Ministry of Social Policy	Andriy Reva	14 April 2016	29 August 2019
Ministry of Social Policy	Yuliya Sokolovska	29 August 2019	4 March 2020
Ministry of Social Policy	Maryna Lazebna	4 March 2020	19 July 2022
Ministry of Social Policy	Oksana Zholnovych	19 July 2022	17 July 2025
Minister of Social Policy, Family and National Unity	Denys Uliutin	17 July 2025	Incumbent

=== List of ministers of Labour ===
Ukrainian People's Republic

Title	Name of minister	Term of office	
Title	Name of minister	Start	End
General Secretary of Labour	Mykola Porsh	12 September 1917	9 January 1918
Minister of Labour	Mykola Porsh	9 January 1918	31 January 1918
Minister of Labour	-		
Minister of Labour	Leonid Mykhailiv	19 March 1918	29 April 1918

Ukrainian State

Title	Name of minister	Term of office	
Title	Name of minister	Start	End
Minister of Labour	Yuliy Wagner	3 May 1918	24 October 1918
Minister of Labour	Maksym Slavynsky	24 October 1918	14 November 1918
Minister of Labour	Volodymyr Kosynsky	14 November 1918	14 December 1918

West Ukrainian People's Republic

Title	Name of minister	Term of office	
Title	Name of minister	Start	End
State Secretary of Labour and Protection	Antin Chernetsky	8 November 1918	1919

Ukrainian People's Republic (restored)

Title	Name of minister	Term of office	
Title	Name of minister	Start	End
Minister of Labour	Leonid Mykhailiv (acting)	26 December 1918	11 February 1919
Minister of Labour	vacant		
Minister of Labour	Yosyp Bezpalko	9 April 1919	1920

Soviet Ukraine

Name of ministry	Name of minister	Term of office	
Name of ministry	Name of minister	Start	End
People's Commissar for Labour	Boris Magidov	28 November 1918	1919
Russian plenipotentiary representative in Ukraine	Nikolai Glebov-Avilov	9 May 1920	January 1921
People's Commissariat of Labor	Omelyan Horbachov	August 1924	23 November 1925
People's Commissariat of Labor	Kyrylo Sukhomlyn	December 1925	January 1927
People's Commissariat of Labor	Kostiantyn Hulyi	March 1927	20 April 1932
People's Commissariat of Labor	Ivan Vyrostkov	20 April 1932	1933
Ministry of Labor	Vitaliy Vasylchenko	1990	October 29, 1991
Ministry of Labor	Mykhailo Kaskevych	October 29, 1991	August 8, 1996
Ministry of Labor	Mykola Bilobotsky	August 1996	July 1997

== See also ==
- Cabinet of Ministers of Ukraine
