= Maryna Lazebna =

Ukrainian civil servant and politician

- Марина Лазебна
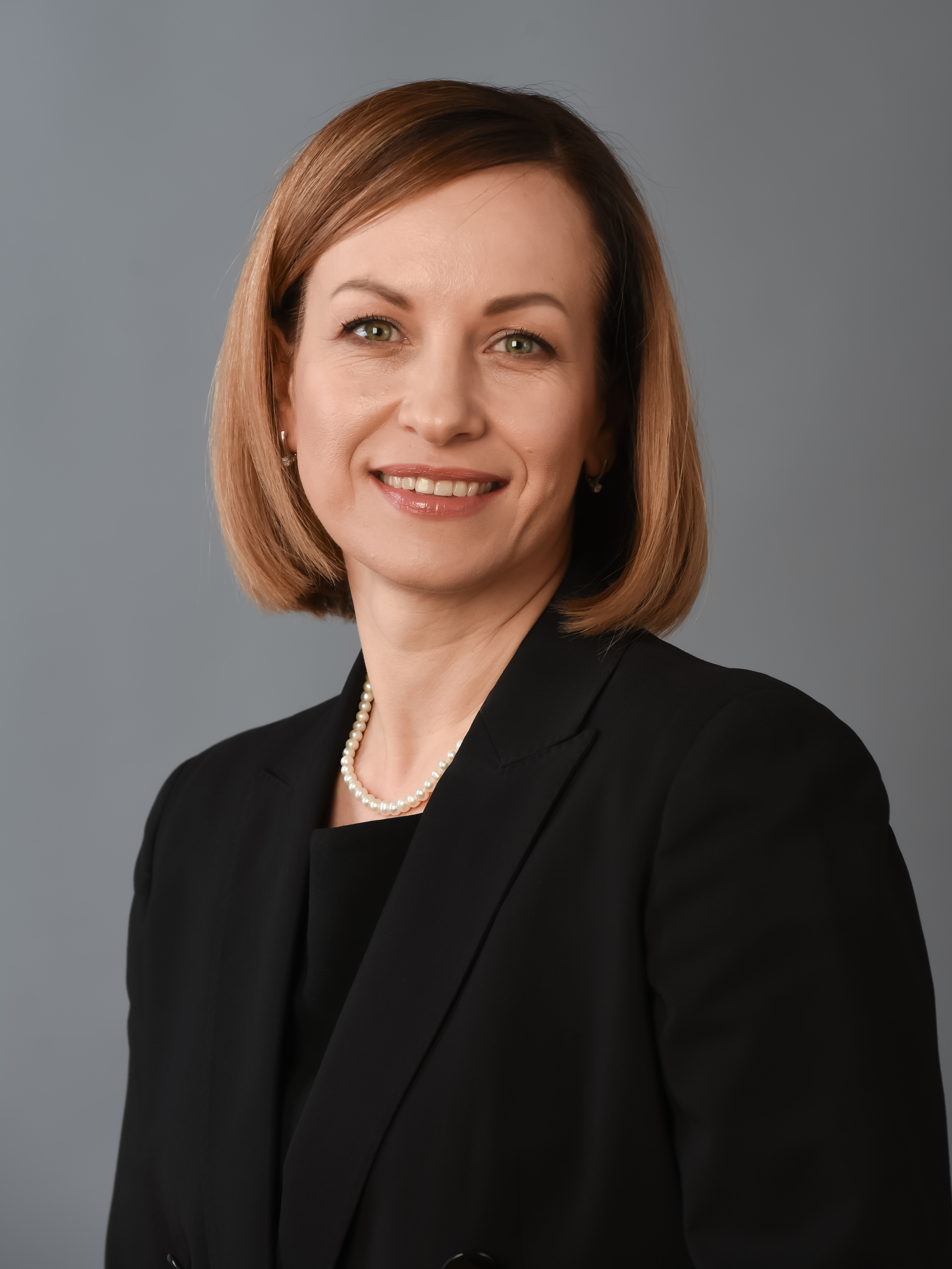
- Official portrait, 2020

Minister of Social Policy
- In office 4 March 2020 – 18 July 2022
- President: Volodymyr Zelenskyy
- Prime Minister: Denys Shmyhal
- Preceded by: Yuliya Sokolovska
- Succeeded by: Oksana Zholnovych

Personal details
- Born: 10 June 1975 (age 50) Piskivka, Ukrainian SSR, Soviet Union (now Ukraine)
- Party: Independent
- Education: Kyiv University
- Occupation: Civil servant politician

Maryna Volodymyrivna Lazebna (Ukrainian: Марина Володимирівна Лазебна; born 10 June 1975) is a Ukrainian civil servant and politician. On 4 March 2020, she was appointed as the Minister of Social Policy of Ukraine.

== Biography ==
In 1998, she graduated from Kyiv University. Holds the title of Candidate of Economic Sciences.

She worked at the Ministry of Economy, the Secretariat of Cabinet of Ministers and the Ministry of Social Policy.

From 2013 to 2014, Lazebna headed the State Employment Service.

From 2015 to 2019, she worked in the project “Modernization of the social support system of Ukraine”.

From August to October 2019, Lazebna was the chairman of the State Social Service.

On March 3, 2020, at a meeting of the Servant of the People faction, she was nominated by President Zelenskyy to the post of Minister of Social Policy.

At an extraordinary meeting of the Verkhovna Rada of Ukraine on March 4, 2020, she was appointed Minister of Social Policy.

On July 15, 2022, Lazebna submitted her resignation from the post of Minister of Social Policy of Ukraine.

On July 18, 2022, by a decision of the Verkhovna Rada of Ukraine, she was dismissed from the post of Minister of Social Policy of Ukraine. This was voted for by 277 deputies.

Maryna Lazebna is one of the founders of the NGOs “New Social Choice” and “Social Order”.

== See also ==
- Shmyhal Government
