= Kamensk, Republic of Buryatia =

Kamensk Каменск
- Urban-type settlement

Other transcription(s)
  - Buryat: Хаамин
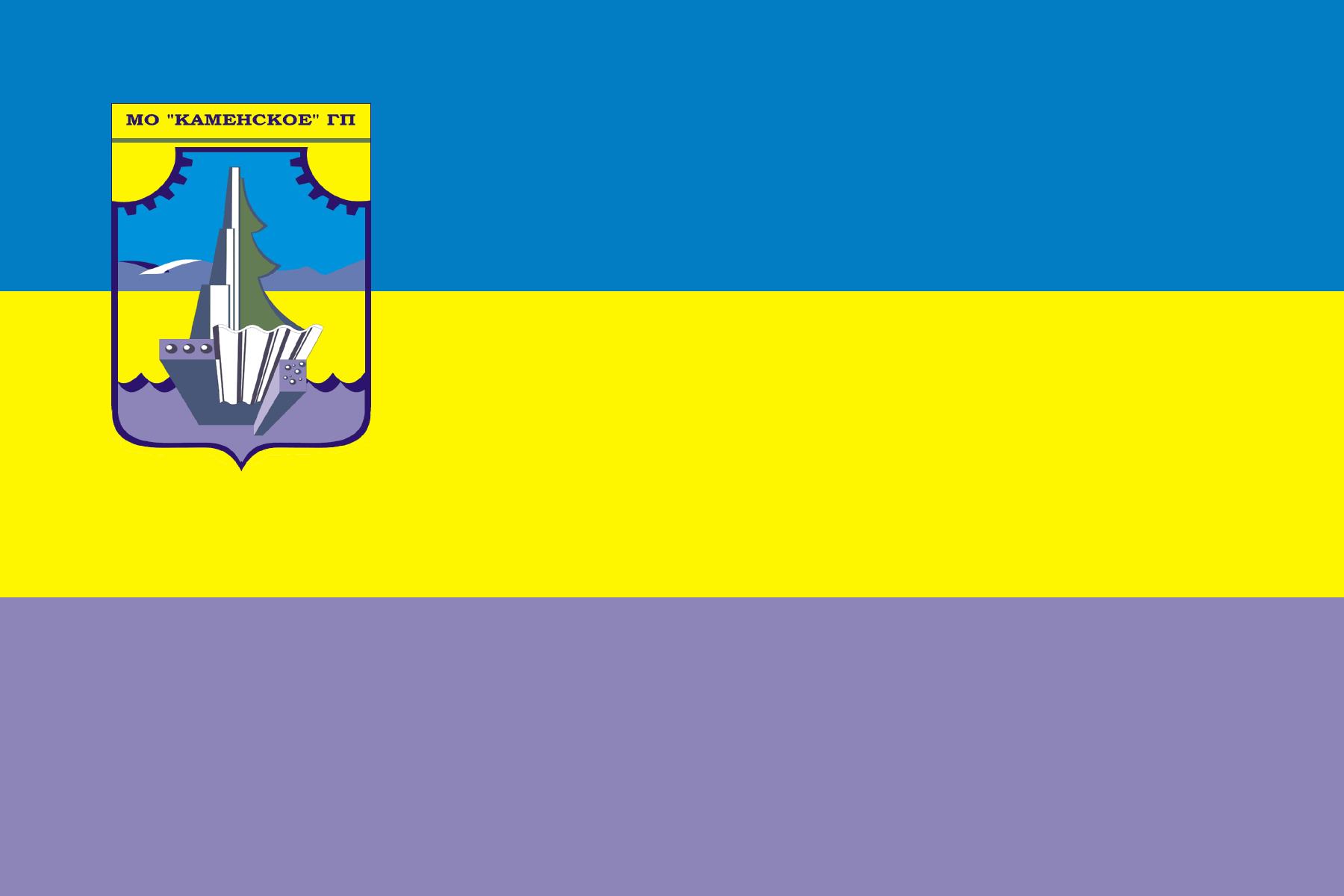
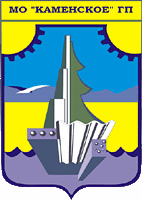
- Flag Coat of arms
- Interactive map of Kamensk
- Location of Kamensk Kamensk (Republic of Buryatia)
- Coordinates: 51°59′N 106°35′E
- Country: Russia
- Federal subject: Buryatia
- Administrative district: Kabansky District
- Urban-type settlementSelsoviet: Kamensk Urban-Type Settlement
- Founded: 1949
- Elevation: 490 m (1,610 ft)

Population (2010 Census)
  - Total: 7,160
  - Estimate (2025): 6,300 (−12%)

Administrative status
  - Capital of: Kamensk Urban-Type Settlement

Municipal status
  - Municipal district: Kabansky Municipal District
  - Urban settlement: Kamenskoye Urban Settlement
  - Capital of: Kamenskoye Urban Settlement
- Time zone: UTC+8 (MSK+5)
- Postal code: 671205
- OKTMO ID: 81624158051

Kamensk population
- 2010 Census: 7,160
- 2002 Census: 8,113
- 1989 Census: 9,088
- 1979 Census: 7,741

Kamensk (Russian: Ка́менск; Buryat: Хаамин, Khaamin) is an urban locality (an urban-type settlement) in Kabansky District of the Republic of Buryatia, Russia. As of the 2010 Census, its population was 7,160.

== Administrative and municipal status ==
Within the framework of administrative divisions, the urban-type settlement (inhabited locality) of Kamensk, together with two rural localities, is incorporated within Kabansky District as Kamensk Urban-Type Settlement (an administrative division of the district). As a municipal division, Kamensk Urban-Type Settlement is incorporated within Kabansky Municipal District as Kamenskoye Urban Settlement.
