= Andriy Reva =

Ukrainian politician

- Андрій Рева
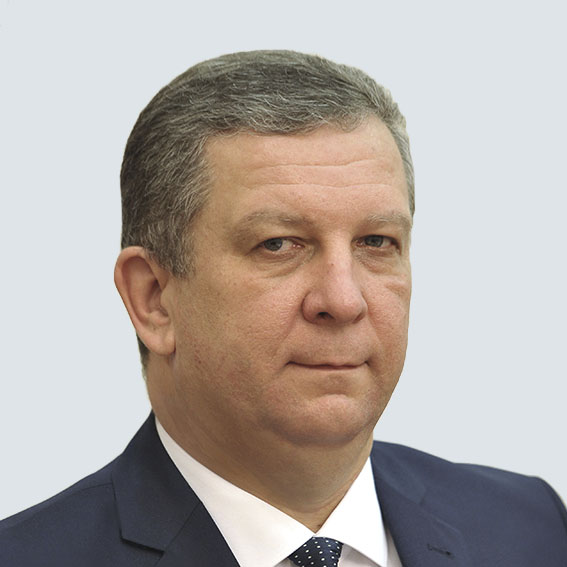

5th Minister of Social Policy of Ukraine
- In office 14 April 2016 – 29 August 2019
- Prime Minister: Volodymyr Groysman
- Preceded by: Pavlo Rozenko
- Succeeded by: Yuliya Sokolovska

Personal details
- Born: July 7, 1966 (age 60) Bohodukhiv, Kharkiv Oblast, Ukrainian SSR
- Party: Petro Poroshenko Bloc "Solidarity"
- Education: Andropov Military and Political College of Anti-Air Defense (1987)
- Occupation: Statesman

Andriy Oleksiyovych Reva (Ukrainian: Андрій Олексійович Рева; born 7 July 1966) is a Ukrainian politician. He served as Minister of Social Policy of Ukraine from 2016 to 2019 in the cabinet of Volodymyr Groysman as a member of the European Solidarity party. Prior to this, from 2005 to 2016, he was deputy mayor of the ecity of Vinnytsia.

== Early life ==
Reva was born on 7 July 1966 in Bohodukhiv, which was then part of the Ukrainian SSR in the Soviet Union. In 1983-1987, he was a cadet at the Yuri Andropov Leningrad Higher Military and Political School of Air Defense. He graduated from the school in 1987, where he qualified to be an officer and political education teacher in social studies and the history of the USSR. He later obtained a second degree in law.

From 1987 to 1989, he was a deputy company commander for the political part of the USSR Armed Forces. From 1989 to 1995, he worked as a history teacher at Vinnytsia Secondary School No. 27.

== Political career ==
In 1995-1998, he was the chairman of the Vinnytsia City Committee of the Trade Union of Education and Science Workers.

From 1998 to 2000, he served as Deputy Mayor of Vinnytsia.

In 2000-2005, he was the Head of the Social Protection Department of the Zamostyansky District Council of Vinnytsia.

From 2005 to April 2016, he worked as Deputy Mayor of Vinnytsia.

From April 14, 2016 to August 29, 2019, Minister of Social Policy of Ukraine in the government of Volodymyr Groysman. In early 2019, during an interview with BBC, he stated that residents of non-government controlled areas of the Donbas who want to receive two pensions should "be patient", and that he felt no sympathy for such people and was only sorry for Ukrainian soldiers and their families. Following this, he received calls for resignation from prominent opposition politicians such as Yulia Tymoshenko, Roman Semenukha, and Yuriy Boyko. Following this, he posteed on Facebook that his words were taken out of context from a longer interview, and said he was referring only to people fighting against Ukraine with weapons, not all residents.

== Personal life ==
He is married and has a daughter.

== Honours and awards ==
Honored Worker of the Social Sphere of Ukraine (Decree of the President of Ukraine No. 53 of January 20, 2010).
