= List of public art in Kyiv =

This is a list of public art in Kyiv, Ukraine. This list applies only to works of public art accessible in an outdoor public space. For example, this does not include artworks in museums.

Image	Title / subject	Location and coordinates	Date	Artist / designer	Type	Material	Dimensions	Designation	Owner / administrator	Wikidata	Notes
	Afghanistan War Memorial, Kyiv	50.4326722°N 30.5562556°E	1994							Q4354024	
More images	Bohdan Khmelnytsky	Sophia Square 50.45356°N 30.51651°E	1888	Mikhail Mikeshin (statue); Vladimir Nikolaev (pedestal)	Statue	bronze (statue); granite (pedestal)				Q4343088	
More images	Fountain of Samson	Podil raion 50.46417°N 30.51694°E	1981		Fountain					Q2377511	Recreation of an 18th Century original demolished in 1934 or 1935
	Independence Monument	Maidan Nezalezhnosti 50.449444°N 30.525444°E	2011		Victory column	white Italian marble	61 m (200 ft)			Q3917633	
	Motherland Monument	Pechersk 50.426521°N 30.563187°E	9 May 1981	Yevgeny Vuchetich, Vasyl Borodai	Statue	Steel	102 m (335 ft)		National Museum of the History of Ukraine in the Second World War	Q142917	
