= V.N. Shimanovsky Ukrainian Institute of Steel Construction =

Ukrainian scientific research and design organization

Coordinates: 50.4557°N 30.6056°E

V.N. Shimanovsky Ukrainian Institute of Steel Construction is a Ukrainian scientific research and design organization that specializes in the design and construction of bridges, towers, plants, stadiums and other structures in Ukraine, the former Soviet republics and other countries.

The institute is run by the Ministry of Regional Development, Construction, and Communal Living of Ukraine of the Government of Ukraine. It is located in Kyiv.

The institute has created television towers in Kyiv, St. Petersburg, Yerevan, Tbilisi, and Kharkiv, It has built plants in Algeria, Nigeria, India and Turkey. One of the institute's largest projects was the construction of the Paton Bridge over the Dnieper River in Kyiv, the first all-welded bridge in the world

== History ==
=== Soviet era ===
In December 1944, in what was then the Soviet Union, the Institute opened in Kyiv as special design bureau of the Promsteelconstruction, run by the Soviet Government. The main task of this bureau was the renovation or reconstruction of bridges, industrial buildings, and other objects destroyed during Second World War. It was soon renamed as the design firm Projectsteelconstruction.

In 1960, the State Design Institute (SDI) “Ukrprojectsteelconstruction” was established based on Projectsteelconstruction. In 1980, professor Vitaliy Nikolayevich Shimanovsky, was appointed director. He was a corresponding member of National Academy of Sciences of Ukraine, Dc. Sc. (Eng.).

In 1983, SDI “Ukrprojectsteelconstruction” was re-organized into the research and design Institute Ukrainian Research and Design Institute of Steel Construction. SDI became one of the leading research institutes in the branch of metal structures in USSR. SDI ran a metal structures plant in Brovary, Ukraine, a center of technological safety in Donbass, Ukraine, and departments in Mariupol, Poltava, Dnepropetrovsk, Kharkiv, Luhansk, and Odesa.

=== Ukraine era ===
In June 1994, the Government of Ukraine organized SDI into an open joint-stock company, the Ukrainian Research and Design Institute of Steel Construction. In 1997, it was included on a list of scientific-technical organizations that had strategical significance for the national economy and security.

Shimanovsky led the Institute for 20 years. More than 10,000 projects were developed during his term and with his direct participation. These projects include bridges, towers, slip docks, metal structures plants, frameworks of unique buildings and facilities. In 2000, after Shimanovsky's death, the institute was named after him.

In 2010, the V.N. Shimanovsky Ukrainian Research and Design Institute of Steel Construction became a limited liability company, the V.N. Shimanovsky Ukrainian Institute of Steel Construction.

The institute was headed by B.P. Petrov, O.I. Shumitskiy, A.I. Isayev, I.A. Nechayev, V.N. Shimanovsky. In 2011, A.V. Shimanovsky, the corresponding member of the National Academy of Sciences of Ukraine, honored the scientist of Ukraine, Dc. Sc. (Eng.), professor became general director of LLC “V.N. Shimanovsky Ukrainian Institute of Steel Construction”. Team of engineers and scientists, who created the intellectual centre of the group, was formed in Institute: V.N. Shimanovsky, O.I. Shumitskiy, P.M. Sosis, V.I. Kireyenko, L.G. Dmitriyev, А.V. Kasilov, V.N. Gordeiev, А.V. Perelmuter, М.P. Kondra, I.N. Lebedich, R.B. Kharchenko, А.S. Gorodetskiy, V.B. Barskiy, Y.S. Borisenko, М.L. Grinberg, А.Y. Pritsker, V.L. Geifman, I.L. Ovdiyenko and dozens of other bright personalities.

== Scientific and technical activity ==
Institute specialists participate in the work of the Scientific Coordination and Expert Council on problems of resources and safe maintenance of structures, buildings and machines under Ukrainian government agencies.

The institute participated in developing the Concept of State program to ensure technical safety in major metal structures. This Concept helped develop the scientific/technical program “Resource”, as well as also branch and regional programs, for creating a state policy on building safety and maintenance.

The technical committee for standardization 301 “Metal building” was established to improve standardization in the building and building materials industries. The institute is authorized to execute functions of this technical committee secretariat.

== Engineering design activities ==
=== Bridges ===
The institute has designed pedestrian bridges in the following Ukrainian cities.

- Kyiv across the Dnieper River
- Zhytomyr across Teteriv River
- Korosten across Uzh River

The institute also designed suspension bridges across the Angara River and the Ural River. A curvilinear bridge across the Dnieper River, with a lightweight steel roadway, was developed during the reconstruction of passage on the Dnieper Hydroelectric Station dam in Zaporizhzhia

One of the important tasks of the institute in the start was the development of the all-welded Е.О. Paton bridge across the Dnieper River in Kyiv, executed in 1953 with the E.O. Paton Electric Welding Institute. In 2001, the design of bridge roadway reconstruction was developed.

=== Towers ===
The institute has designed all-welded high-rise TV towers in Kyiv, St. Petersburg, Yerevan, Tbilisi, and Kharkiv. It has also designed antenna masts that are over 260 m high for broadcasting stations, unified towers for TV re-transmitters and radio relay lines.

V.N. Shimanovsky designed the 385 m Kyiv TV Tower for the USSR Ministry of Communications. Leading design, construction, and mounting organizations were involved in the erection of television towers on all stages.

=== Monuments ===
Institute specialists helped develop and erect the Mother Motherland monument on the grounds of the National Museum of the History of Ukraine in the Second World War in Kyiv.

=== Industrial buildings ===
Institute specialists have designed and built many large industrial facilities, including metallurgical works and metal structures manufacturing plants. These included the Novolipetsk metallurgic plant workshop and the Tevosyan plant in Electrostal, Russia. The institute also worked on metallurgic plants in Bokaro, India, Seydişehir. Turkey, Annaba, Algeria, and Ajaokuta Nigeria..

=== Public buildings ===
The institute has developed projects of bearing metal structures for large public buildings.

Projects in Kyiv include

- the National Palace of Arts "Ukraina"
- the Hotel Kyiv
- the Trade Unions Building
- the Ukrainian House
- the Kyiv-Pasazhyrskyi railway station
- the International Exhibition Centre
- the Expocenter of Ukraine

The institute has also developed sporting facilities in Ukraine:

- Yuvileiny Stadium in Sumy
- Olimp sports complex in Uzhniy
- Valeriy Lobanovskyi Dynamo Stadium in Kyiv, a reconstruction project in conjunction with the National Academy of Arts of Ukraine
- Metallurg Stadium in Dnipro, design and construction of new roof.

=== Pipelines ===
The institute has designed engineering facilities on trunk oil- and gas-pipelines, vessels of different tankage for oil and oil products.

In 2003, the institute designed of 75000 m3 vessel for the Brody linear production station, the only intermediate pump station on Ukrainian part of the Druzhba pipeline. The institute has designed oil storage tanks for oil refineries of Ukraine, including a raw materials park for Naftokhimik-Prykarpattia in Nadvirna

== Publications ==
=== The Industrial Construction and Engineering Structures Journal ===
The quarterly Journal publishes articles about architecture, design, the building of industrial-purposed objects and engineering structures. It also publishes new research results on technical diagnostics, development, and improvement of metal building the normative base.

The Journal is on the list of core publications on technical science and the list of scientific specialized publications, in which the main results of dissertation works may be published.

=== The Collection of Proceedings of the V.N. Shimanovsky Ukrainian Institute of Steel Construction ===
The collection of proceedings includes articles with research results in a branch of calculation and design of structures; theoretical and structural mechanics; theory of elasticity and plasticity; development of calculation and design methods for structures, buildings and facilities, development of rational types of structures, and also experimental theoretical research of elements and connections work, improvement of materials, manufacturing and erection technology, repair and reconstruction of buildings and facilities, development and improvement of the normative base in building branch.

The collection of proceedings of the V.N. Shimanovsky Ukrainian Institute of Steel Construction is included into the list of core publications on technical science and also into the list of scientific specialized publications, in which the main results of dissertation works may be published.

== Literature ==
- Aroshenko, Mikhail; Gordeev, Vadim; Lebedych, Igor (2004). Таємниці сталевих конструкцій [Secrets of steel structures] (PDF) (in Ukrainian). Kyiv: Stal. Archived from the original on 2017-07-16.
- Slyusarenko, Y.S.; Shimanovsky, O.V.; Galinskiy, O.M. (2003). Scientific and technical assistance of reconstruction of National sports complex "Olympiyskiy" in Kiev / Edited by O.V. Shimanovsky. К.: publishing house “Stal”. p. 325.
- Жили-були [Once Upon a Time]. Kyiv: Stal. 2004.
- Zlobin, Hennadiĭ Karpovych, ed. (2008). Академія БУДІВНИЦТВА України. 15 років звершень [Academy of Construction of Ukraine: 15 years of achievements] (in Ukrainian). Kyiv: Svit Uspikhu. ISBN 978-966-8352-34-8.
- Ministry of Regional Development, Construction, and Communal Living of Ukraine (2013). "List of basic scientific and technical organizations in construction" (PDF).
- Higher certification commission of Ukraine (2010). "List of scientific specialized publications of Ukraine, in which results of dissertation works may be published" (PDF). Archived from the original (PDF) on 2014-01-04.
