= Aliona Babak =

Ukrainian politician

- Альона Бабак
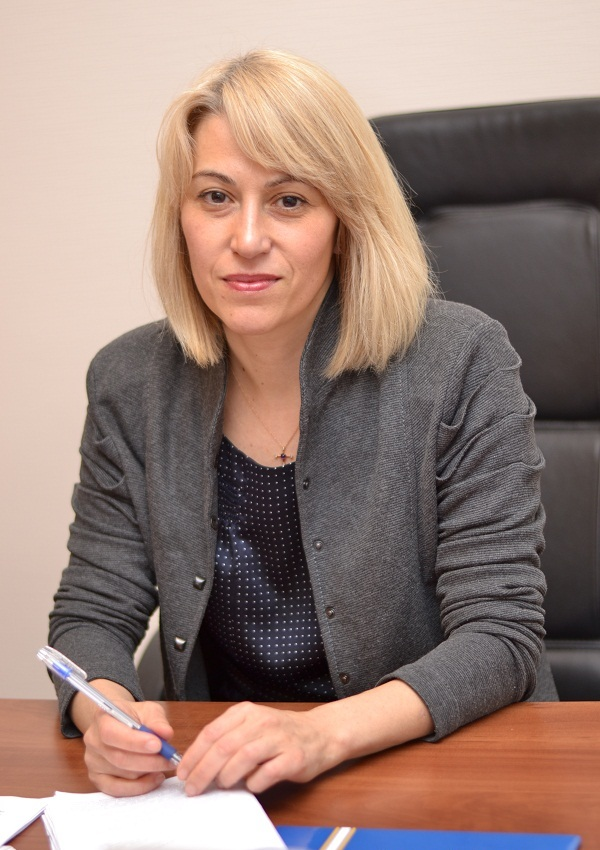
- Babak in 2015

People's Deputy of Ukraine
- In office 27 November 2014 – 11 March 2017

Minister for Communities and Territories Development
- In office 29 August 2019 – 4 February 2020
- Prime Minister: Oleksiy Honcharuk
- Preceded by: Hennadiy Zubko
- Succeeded by: Denys Shmygal

Personal details
- Born: 27 September 1969 (age 56) Kryvyi Rih, Dnipropetrovsk Oblast, Ukrainian SSR, Soviet Union
- Party: Self Reliance

Aliona Valeriyivna Babak (Ukrainian: Альона Валеріївна Бабак, born September 27, 1969) is a Ukrainian politician and former Minister of Regional Development. On 16 January 2020 she announced her resignation. On 4 February 2020 she was formerly dismissed by Parliament (Verkhovna Rada).

Babak was a member of the Parliament of Ukraine of the 8th convocation, member of parliamentary faction Samopomich Union. She was elected to the Verkhovna Rada in the October 2014 Ukrainian parliamentary election, appearing 8th on the party list of Samopomich Union. She left parliament in March 2017, claiming "I'm not a politician, I'm more of an expert. Political activity is difficult for me as a person."

== Biography ==
Aliona Babak was born in Kryvyi Rih, Dnipropetrovsk Oblast. She graduated with honours from the Kyiv State Pedagogic Institute of Foreign Languages, attaining the qualification of foreign languages teacher (English and French) in 1996.

In 1996, she won the Edmund Muskie Fund grant for studying in the US, which allowed her to attain a master's degree in Business Administration and Finance from Old Dominion University, Virginia.

Since 1998, Babak has worked as an entrepreneur, manager of international projects, head specialist on pricing and financial management in housing and local development. In 2004, she co-founded and became a member of the managing board of the charity organisation 'Local Development Institute', where she specialises in financial management of housing. She has written 30 academic papers on reforming housing and communal services and regulations for the natural monopolists.

She is a member of a working group on reforming of housing and communal services with the Ministry of Regional Development, Construction, Housing and Communal Services of Ukraine. Member of the Consulting Council at the National Commission on State Regulation of Communal Services.

== See also ==
- List of members of the parliament of Ukraine, 2014–19
- Honcharuk Government
