= Mother Ukraine =

Monumental statue in Kyiv, Ukraine

- Батьківщина-Мати
- Mother Ukraine in 2024
- Interactive map of Mother Ukraine
- Location: National Museum of the History of Ukraine in the Second World War, Pechersk, Kyiv, Ukraine
- Coordinates: 50.426521°N 30.563187°E
- Designer: Vasyl Borodai
- Material: Stainless Steel
- Height: 102 m (335 ft)
- Beginning date: 1979; 47 years ago
- Opening date: May 9, 1981; 45 years ago
- Dedicated to: Motherland; Ukraine; Russo-Ukrainian war Soviet victory in WWII (originally)
- Website: Official webpage

Immovable Monument of Local Significance of Ukraine
- Official name: Монумент „Батьківщина-мати” (Mother Motherland Monument)
- Type: Science and Technology
- Reference no.: 991/1-Кв

Mother Ukraine (Ukrainian: Батьківщина-Мати, romanized: Bat’kivszchyna-Maty [bɐtʲkʲiu̯ˈʃtʃɪnɐ ˈmɑtɪ]) is a monumental Soviet-era statue in Kyiv, the capital of Ukraine. The sculpture is a part of the National Museum of the History of Ukraine in the Second World War. In 2023, the Soviet heraldry was removed from the monument's shield and replaced with Ukraine's coat of arms, the tryzub, in response to the Russo-Ukrainian war.

== Name ==
The monument's initial name was the Mother Motherland (Ukrainian: Батьківщина-Мати, romanized: Batkivshchýna-Máty), which derives from Russian Mother Motherland (Russian: Родина-мать, romanized: Rodina-mat'), a name for the national personification used by both Russia and the Soviet Union. Along with other monuments built across the USSR (e.g. The Motherland Calls in Volgograd), the statue originally symbolized Soviet victory on the Eastern Front of the Second World War (known in Soviet historiography as "Great Patriotic War"). On 29 July 2023, amidst the removal of the Soviet heraldry from the monument, the director of the memorial complex Yuri Savchuk announced that it would be renamed to Mother Ukraine, yet as of 27 August 2023, no official decision by the Ukrainian Ministry of Culture and Strategic Communications had been made.

== Description ==
The stainless steel statue stands 62 m (203 ft) tall with the overall structure measuring 102 m (335 ft) including its base and weighing 560 tonnes. The sword in the statue's right hand is 16 m (52 ft) long, weighing 9 tonnes, with the left hand holding up a 13 by 8 m (43 by 26 ft) shield originally emblazoned with the hammer and sickle emblem of the Soviet Union. Initially, the statue was drawn by the sculptor Yevgeny Vuchetich. Vuchetich based the statue on the Ukrainian painter Nina Danyleiko. When Vuchetich died in 1974, the project was continued by Vasyl Borodai, who used Ukrainian sculptor Halyna Kalchenko, a daughter of the Chairman of the Council of Ministers of the Ukrainian SSR Nikifor Kalchenko, as the model.

The base of the statue houses the National Museum of the History of Ukraine in the Second World War. The memorial hall of the museum displays marble plaques with carved names of more than 11,600 soldiers and over 200 workers of the home-front honoured during the war with the title of the Hero of the Soviet Union and the Hero of Socialist Labour. On the hill beneath the museum, traditional flower shows are held. The sword of the statue was shortened by four meters from its project height. Some sources claim this was done so that the tip of the sword was lower than the cross of the Kyiv Pechersk Lavra. In reality, however, it was done to resolve aerodynamic problems identified during wind tunnel testing by specialists from Moscow.

== Design and construction ==
Original shield showing the Soviet emblem

In the 1950s there were plans to construct twin monuments of Vladimir Lenin and Joseph Stalin, nearly 200 m (660 ft) tall each on the site. However, this did not go ahead. Instead, according to legend, in the 1970s, a group of Communist Party officials and Soviet sculptor Yevgeny Vuchetich looked across at the hills by the Lavra and decided the panorama needed a war memorial. Vuchetich had designed the other two most famous giant Soviet war memorials, The Motherland Calls in Volgograd and the Soviet soldier carrying German infant in East Berlin. The statue was modelled after one of his coworkers, Mila Hazinsky. However, after Vuchetich died in 1974, the design of the memorial was substantially reworked, and only the eyes and eyebrows remained from the original face. It was then completed under the guidance of Vasyl Borodai.

In 2023 Ukrainian TV channel 1+1 interviewed the grandson of Vasyl Borodai who presented them with the original projects of the statue. According to him, the sculptor originally wanted the statue to hold a palm branch, the symbol of peace. The Communist Party, however, wanted a sword.

Final plans for the statue were made in 1978, with construction beginning in 1979. It was controversial, with many criticising the costs and claiming the funds could have been better spent elsewhere. When Director of Construction Ivan Petrovich was asked to confirm the cost of 9 million rubles, he responded that this was a conservative estimate. The actual costs have been estimated at 12 million Soviet rubles; for comparison, the average salary of an engineer in the contemporary Soviet Union was only 100 rubles. The statue was opened on Victory Day, 9 May 1981 (one year later than planned), in a ceremony attended by Soviet General Secretary Leonid Brezhnev.

== Maintenance ==
In post-Soviet Kyiv, the statue remained controversial, with some claiming it should be pulled down and its metal used for more functional purposes. Financial shortages mean that the flame, which uses up to 400 m^{3} (14,000 cu ft) of gas per hour, can only burn on the most prominent national holidays. Additionally, rumours persist that the statue is built on unstable foundations, something vehemently denied by the Kyiv city government.

== Decommunisation ==
In April 2015, the parliament of Ukraine outlawed Soviet and communist symbols, street names, and monuments as part of the decommunisation of Ukraine. However, World War II monuments are excluded from these laws. Director of the Ukrainian Institute of National Remembrance Volodymyr Viatrovych stated in February 2018 that the Soviet state emblem on the shield of the monument should be removed and replaced with the Ukrainian trident coat of arms.

On 6 May 2023, in the context of the Russo-Ukrainian war, the Ministry of Culture announced that plans to remove the Soviet emblem and replace it with the Ukrainian tryzub were underway.

On 13 July 2023, the DIAM urban planning agency announced that the Soviet state emblem would be replaced with the Ukrainian trident coat of arms. DIAM claims that in 2022, 85% of 800,000 consulted citizens favoured replacing the Soviet imagery with the trident emblem. The work to remove the Soviet emblem began on 13 July 2023.

The design of the trident was developed by Ukrainian sculptor Oleksiy Perhamenshchyk with help of the third President of Ukraine Viktor Yushchenko.

On 1 August 2023, the Soviet emblem was removed from the Mother Ukraine Monument. Its replacement by the Ukrainian Trident began on 5 August 2023, as part of the preparations for the Independence Day of Ukraine on 24 August. It was completed on schedule despite the crew facing problems of intense wind, heavy rain and Russian air raids.

The emblem replacement raised a controversy about the state budget spending during the wartime. Before the work was finished Ukrainian parliament voted to dismiss Minister of Culture Oleksandr Tkachenko.

On 1 August 2024, director of the Paton Institute of Electric Welding Ihor Krivtsun stated that according to his institute's inspection the trident on the shield is at risk of being corroded and pulled out. The trident's designer, Perhamenshchyk, denied this, saying that the replacement work was overseen by Shimanovsky Institute of Steel Construction, which also had overseen the construction in the 70's and that the trident was made of stainless steel with the same material proportion as the rest of the statue while the effect mistaken for corrosion that was seen from the drones was actually a yellowing of the upper nanolayer of the welding seam caused by interaction of air with 0.08% carbon that the steel contains. The War Museum stated that the actual results of the inspection didn't show any signs of corrosion, instead there were only minor defects which the institute agreed to fix. 10 October museum's press service informed that Paton Institute fixed all the minor defects, finishing the decommunization process, according to their latest inspection the welds now meet all the requirements of regulatory documentation.

== In popular culture ==
A scene in the 2006 novel World War Z depicts a Ukrainian tank commander and his surviving men fleeing in their vehicles from an abandoned and burning Kyiv under the watchful gaze of the monument.

The monument was the site of a pit stop during the tenth episode of The Amazing Race 10.

The monument is prominently featured in the music video for the song "Get Out" by the Scottish band Frightened Rabbit.

== Gallery ==
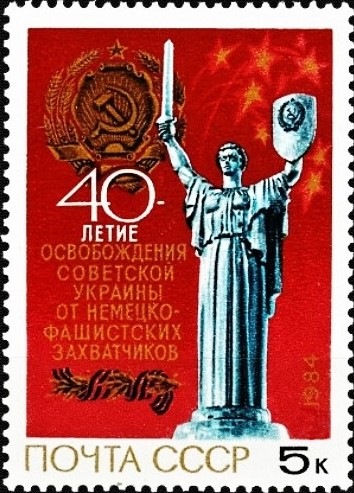
The monument on a 1984 Soviet stamp "40th anniversary of the liberation of Soviet Ukraine from German fascist invaders"

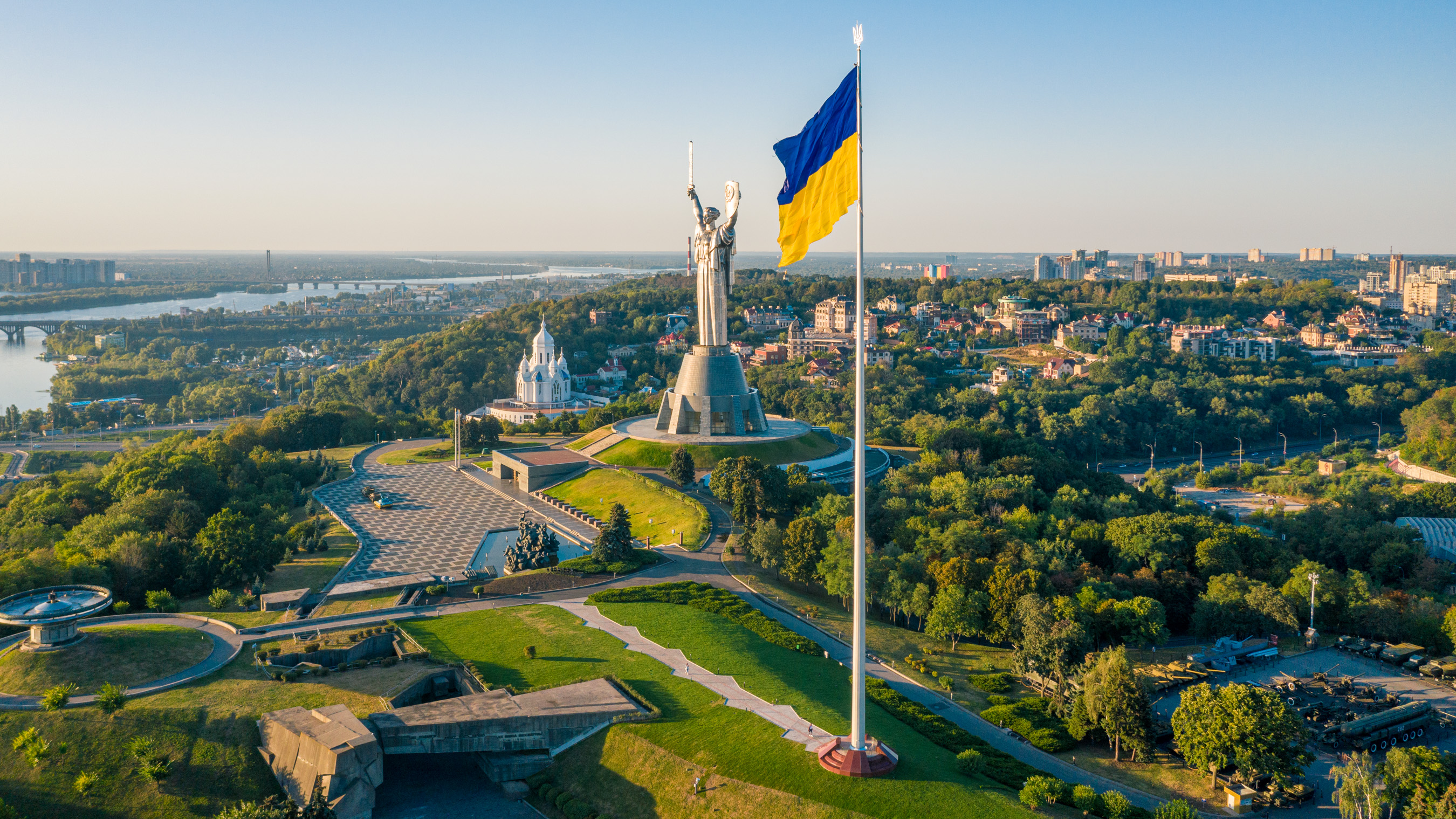
View with Pecherskyi Landscape Park

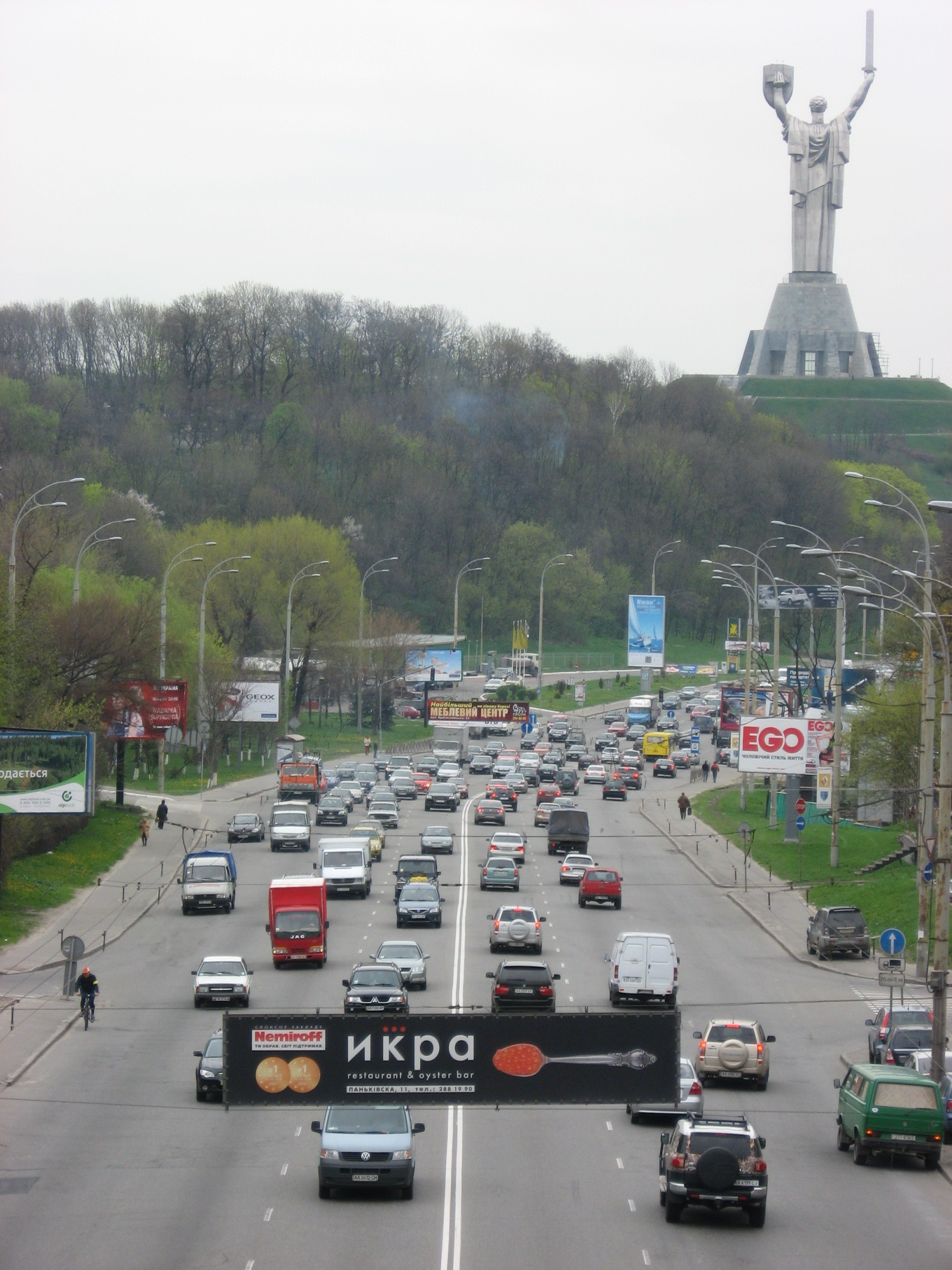

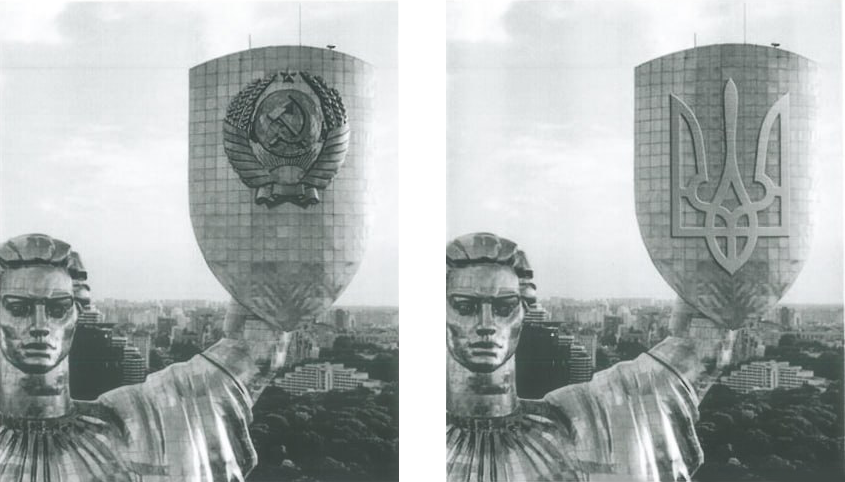
Official artist's impression replacing the Soviet emblem with the Ukrainian tryzub

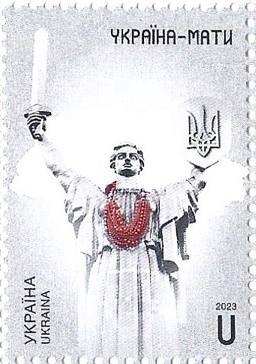
The monument on a 2023 Ukrainian stamp

Mother Ukraine at sunset

== See also ==
- List of tallest statues
- Kartlis Deda
- Mother Motherland (Saint Petersburg)
- Mound of Glory
- Memorial Complex "Hall of Remembrance"
- Mother Armenia
- The Motherland Calls
