= Vitalii Bezghin =

Ukrainian politician (born 1990)

- Віталій Безгін
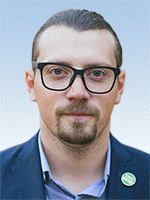
- Official Verkhovna Rada portrait, 2019

Minister of Communities, Territories Development and Internally Displaced Persons
- Incumbent
- Assumed office 16 July 2026
- President: Volodymyr Zelenskyy
- Prime Minister: Serhii Koretskyi
- Preceded by: Office established

Personal details
- Born: 18 April 1990 (age 36) Yevpatoria, Crimean Oblast, Ukrainian SSR, Soviet Union
- Party: Servant of the People

Vitalii Yuriiovych Bezghin (Ukrainian: Віталій Юрійович Безгін; born 18 April 1990) is a Ukrainian politician serving as minister of communities, territories development and internally displaced persons since 2026. From 2019 to 2026, he was a member of the Verkhovna Rada.
