= Monument of the Great October Revolution =

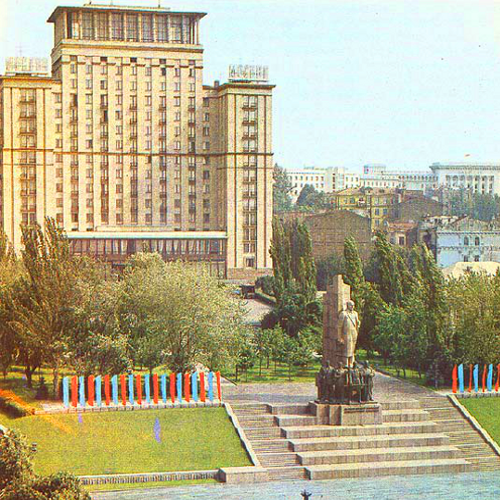
- Monument of the Great October Revolution in front of the Moscow Hotel (now Hotel Ukraine)
- Interactive map of Monument of the Great October Revolution
- Location: Kiev, Ukrainian SSR
- Designer: Vasyl Borodai, Ivan Znoba, Valentyn Znoba
- Type: Monument composition
- Material: granite, bronze
- Height: 18.4 m (60 ft)
- Completion date: 22 October 1977; 48 years ago
- Dedicated to: October Revolution
- Dismantled date: 12 September 1991; 34 years ago
- Due to 2015 Ukrainian decommunization laws all communist monuments in Ukraine legally have to be dismantled.

Monument of the Great October Revolution (Ukrainian: Монумент Великій Жовтневій соціалістичній революції, romanized: Monument Velykii Zhovtnevii sotsialistychnii revoliutsii) was a Soviet monument that was located on the October Revolution Square from 1977–1991 (now Independence Square) in Kiev, at the time the capital of the Ukrainian Soviet Socialist Republic as part of the Soviet Union. It was removed in 1991 as part of the decommunisation of Ukraine following independence.

== Description ==
The monument had a form of a granite pylon with a figure of Vladimir Lenin out of red granite (8.9 m (29 ft)). In front of the pylon there were four bronze figures of male and female workers, peasant and sailor, each 5.25 m (17.2 ft) in height. The whole composition was located on a granite stylobate.

== History ==
The Monument of the Great October Revolution was erected in 1977 by Ukrainian communist officials to commemorate the 60th anniversary of the October Revolution. During the 1990 Revolution on Granite, the monument was used by anti-communist student activists as a shield against a nearby bomb planted in the area. Following Ukrainian independence in 1991 and the collapse of the Soviet Union, the majority of monuments to Lenin were destroyed. This included the Monument of the Great October Revolution being toppled. The destruction of the monument was ordered by the Kyiv City State Administration and the toppled statue was taken to the property of the privatised ""Ukrrestavratsiya" where its fate was unknown. The pedestal initially remained and was used for mounting advertising boards for a camera shop the following year.

=== Designers ===
The following architects designed and built the monument:

- Vasyl Borodai, sculptor
- Ivan Znoba, sculptor
- Valentyn Znoba, sculptor
- Oleksandr Malynovsky, architect
- M.Skybytsky, architect

== Gallery ==
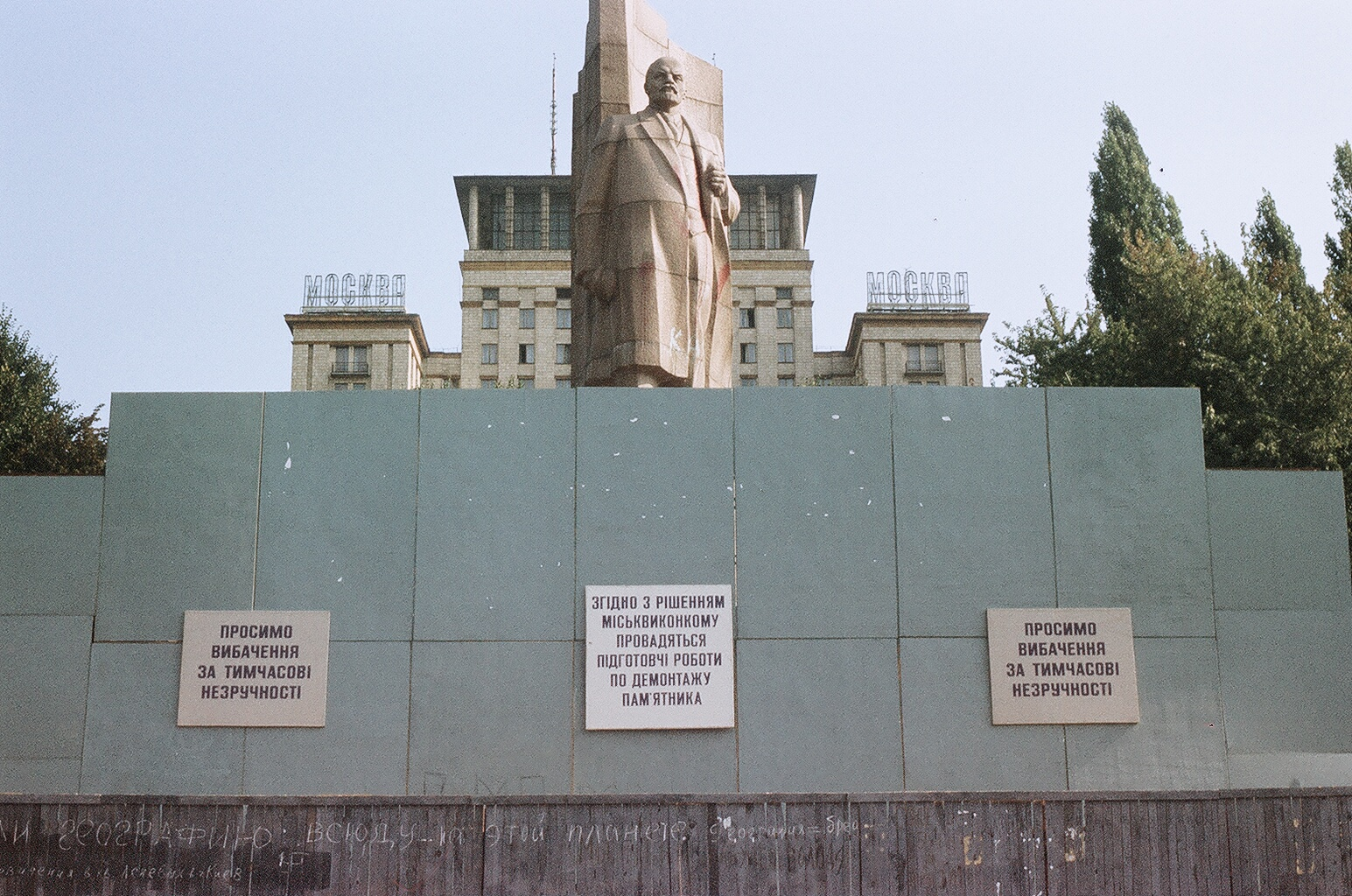
Removal of the monument on September 12, 1991, by decision of the Kiev City Council

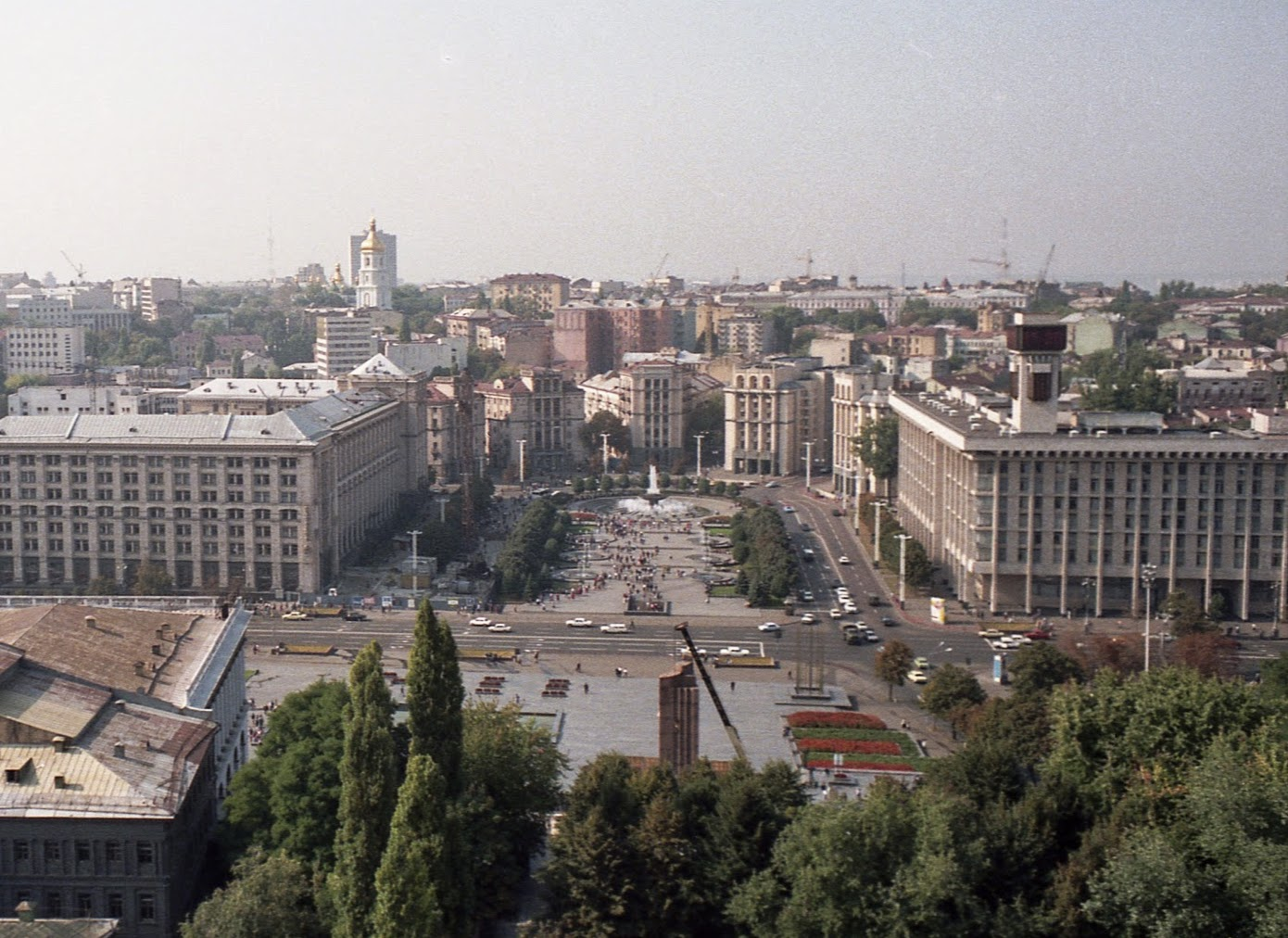
Maidan Nezalezhnosti in September 1991; the monument is being taken down

== See also ==
- Vladimir Lenin monument, Kyiv
- Decommunization in Ukraine
