= Afghanistan War Memorial, Kyiv =

Military memorial in Kyiv, Ukraine

- Меморіальний комплекс пам'яті воїнів України, полеглих в Афганістані
- For Soviet–Afghan War
- Established: 3 December 1994
- Location: 50°25′57.62″N 30°33′22.52″E; Kyiv, Ukraine
- Designed by: Mykola Oliynyk

The Afghanistan War Memorial is a monument in Kyiv, the capital of Ukraine, commemorating specially the Ukrainian soldiers who died fighting during the Soviet–Afghan War. Unveiled in 1994 and expanded in 1999, the monument complex features a long cobblestone alley leading to a monument of three soldiers standing on a granite pedestal surrounded by black tulips, a symbol associated with the troubles in Afghanistan. It is regularly visited by Ukrainian heads of state and other officials on 15 February, the day the final Soviet troops withdrew from the nation, and became the central design of the logo for the Ukrainian political party Veterans of Afghanistan.

== Overview and history ==
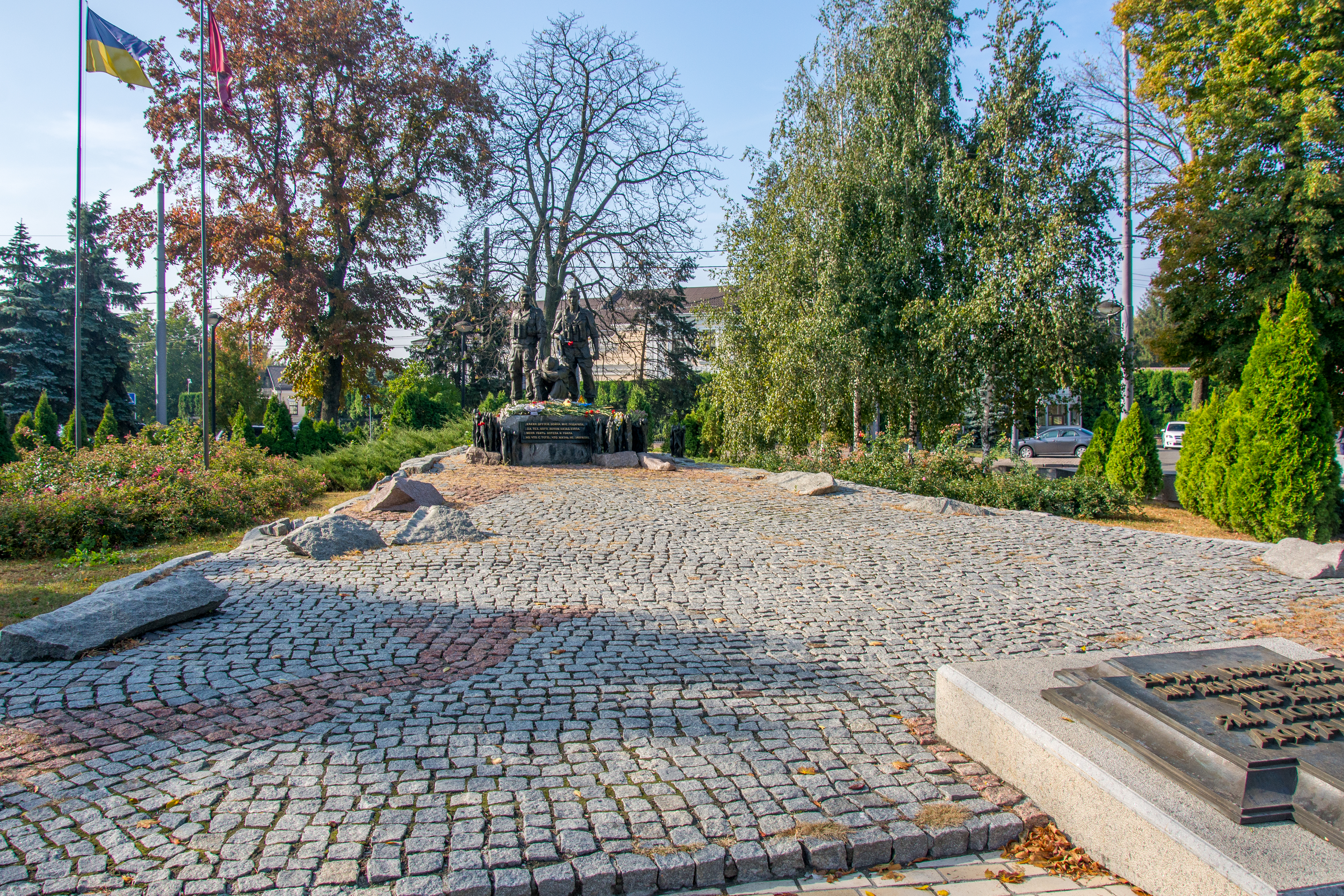
The larger monument complex displaying the cobblestone alley and slab dedication plaque at the front

The memorial commemorates the Ukrainian soldiers killed during the Soviet–Afghan War from 1979 to 1989; during which 15,000 of the 620,000 Soviet soldiers who took part died, and 115 of the 5,358 soldiers from Kyiv died. It was designed by Ukrainian sculptor Mykola Oliynyk, and unveiled by the Ukrainian Union of Veterans of the War on 3 December 1994. On 15 February 1999, the memorial was reconstructed and expanded by architect Mykola Kyslyi to commemorate the tenth anniversary of the end of the conflict. It is located in front of the Church of the Resurrection, also commonly referred to as "the Afghan Church", situated between the Pechersk Lavra and the National Museum of the History of Ukraine in the Second World War.

The memorial is often visited by heads of state in Ukraine and other officials on 15 February, the day the final Soviet troops withdrew from the nation. In 2020 and 2021, President Volodymyr Zelenskyy laid flowers and paid tribute to the veterans attending the ceremony who survived the war. The 2021 ceremony was also attended by Deputy Minister for Veterans' Affairs Oleksiy Ilyashenko, Director of the Department of Social Policy of the Kyiv City State Administration Ruslan Svitlyi, Head of the Kyiv Regional State Administration Vasyl Volodin, and the leader of the Ukrainian Union of Veterans of Afghanistan Serhiy Chervonopysky. Zelenskyy returned in 2023, where he placed a basket of blue and gold flowers, honoring both those killed in this war and all ongoing conflicts, including the Russian invasion of Ukraine.

== Design ==
The 1999 reconstruction and expansion of the memorial turned it into a larger memorial complex, which includes a paved, cobblestone alley which leads to the main monument. The monument is located on a granite pedestal surrounded by black tulips, symbols associated with the troubles in Afghanistan, made of bronze breaking through the stone. It depicts three soldiers who had "just pulled out the fight". The monument of the soldiers became the central design of the logo for the Ukrainian political party Veterans of Afghanistan. The front of the alley has a small slab with a dedication written on it.
