= Ministry of Communities and Territories Development =

Government ministry of Ukraine

- Міністерство розвитку громад та територій України
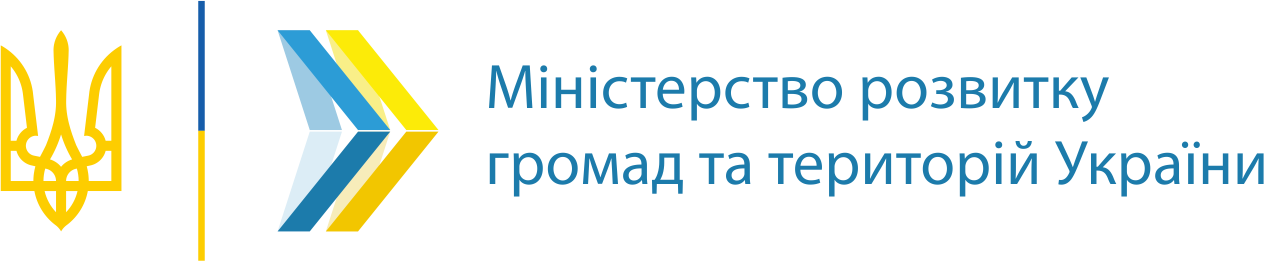
- Ministry logo

Agency overview
- Formed: 29 August 2019; 16 July 2026 (re-established)
- Preceding agency: Ministry of Regional Development, Construction, and Public Housing and Utilities
- Dissolved: 2 December 2022
- Jurisdiction: Government of Ukraine
- Headquarters: 9, Velyka Zhytomyrska, Kyiv, Ukraine, 01601
- Minister responsible: Vitalii Bezghin, Minister of Communities, Territories Development and Internally Displaced Persons
- Child agency: State Architectural-Construction Inspection of Ukraine
- Website: https://www.minregion.gov.ua/

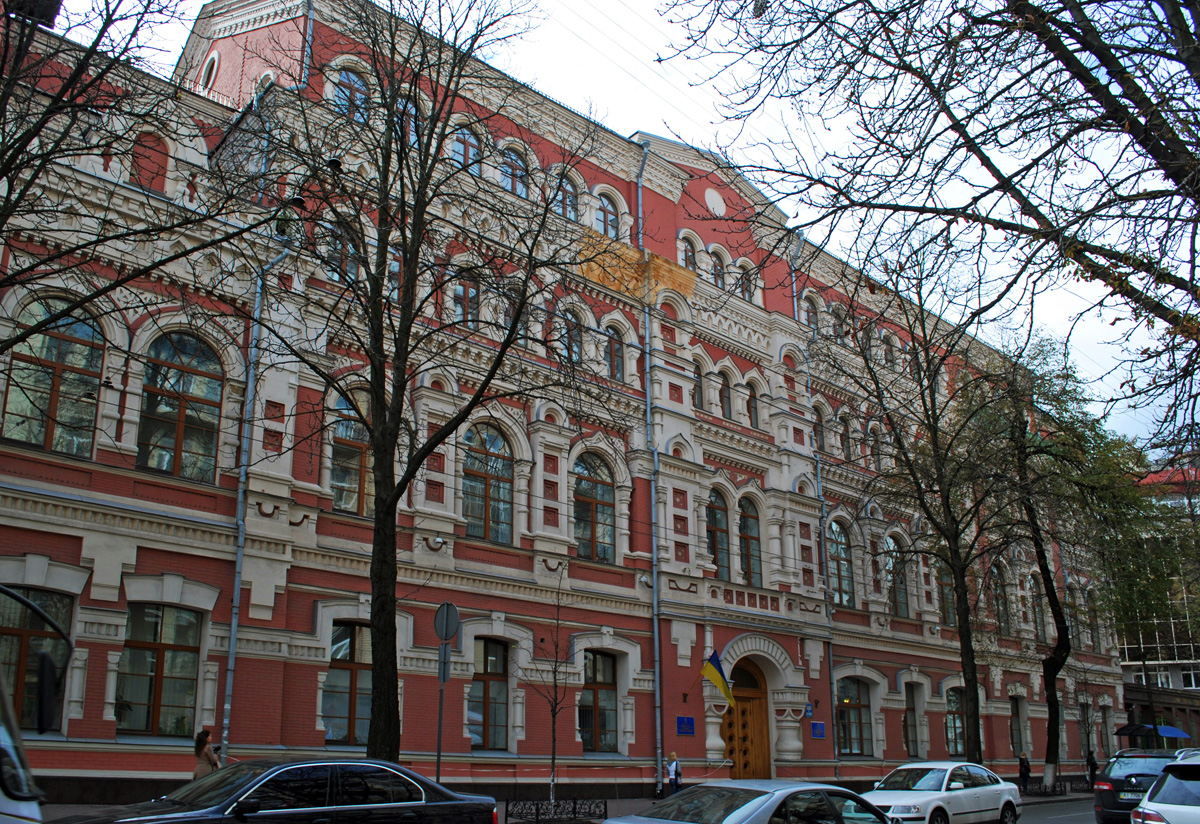
Headquarters of the Ministry in Kyiv

The Ministry of Communities, Territories Development and Internally Displaced Persons is a Ukrainian government ministry that exists since 16 July 2026.

The Ministry was created as the Ministry of Communities and Territories Development (Ukrainian: Міністерство регіонального розвитку, будівництва та житлово-комунального господарства України, romanized: Ministerstvo rehionalnoho rozvytku, budivnytstva ta zhytlovo-komunalnoho hospodarstva Ukrainy), responsible for public housing and infrastructure development, on 29 August 2019. It was dissolved on 2 December 2022.

== History ==
The Ministry was established in 2005 as the Ministry of Construction, Architecture, and Public Housing and Utilities. It also can be considered as a successor of the Ministry of Construction and Architecture that existed before 1994. In 2007-2010 the ministry was split into two: Ministry of Regional Development & Construction and Ministry of Public Housing and Utilities.

On 2 December 2022 the Shmyhal Government merged the Ministry of Infrastructure with the Ministry of Communities and Territories Development creating the Ministry of Development of Communities, Territories and Infrastructure.

On 16 July 2026 the ministry was restored as part of the Koretskyi Government, with Vitalii Bezghin being appointed its new head.

== Structure ==
The ministry consists of the central body of ministry headed by its leadership composed of a minister, his/hers first deputy, and other deputies in assistance to the minister. Part of ministry compose several state administrations that are specialized in certain field and coordinate operations of government companies.

=== Agencies and institutes ===
- State Architectural-Construction Inspection of Ukraine
- V.N. Shimanovsky Ukrainian Institute of Steel Construction

== List of ministers ==
Name of Ministry	Name of minister	Term of Office	
Name of Ministry	Name of minister	Start	End
Ministry of Construction	Volodymyr Plitin	August 2, 1990	June 5, 1991
Ministry of Investments and Construction	Volodymyr Borysovsky	June 5, 1991	December 30, 1992
Ministry of Construction and Architecture	Yuriy Serbin	December 30, 1992	July 8, 1994
Ministry of Construction	Volodymyr Plitin	July 6, 1994	June 12, 1995
Ministry of Construction, Architecture, and Public Housing and Utilities	Pavlo Kachur	September 28, 2005	August 4, 2006
Ministry of Construction, Architecture, and Public Housing and Utilities	Volodymyr Rybak	August 4, 2006	March 21, 2007
Ministry of Regional Development and Construction	Volodymyr Yatsuba	March 21, 2007	December 18, 2007
Ministry of Regional Development and Construction	Vasyl Kuybida	December 18, 2007	March 11, 2010
Ministry of Regional Development and Construction	Volodymyr Yatsuba	March 11, 2010	December 9, 2010
Ministry of Regional Development, Construction, and Public Housing and Utilities	Viktor Tikhonov	December 9, 2010	June 1, 2011
Ministry of Regional Development, Construction, and Public Housing and Utilities	Anatoliy Blyznyuk	July 12, 2011	24 December 2012
Ministry of Regional Development, Construction, and Public Housing and Utilities	Hennadiy Temnyk	24 December 2012	27 February 2014
Ministry of Regional Development, Construction, and Public Housing and Utilities	Volodymyr Hroysman	27 February 2014	2 December 2014
Ministry of Regional Development, Construction, and Public Housing and Utilities	Hennadiy Zubko	2 December 2014	29 August 2019
Ministry of Communities and Territories Development	Aliona Babak	29 August 2019	4 February 2020
Ministry of Communities and Territories Development	Denys Shmyhal	4 February 2020	4 March 2020
Ministry of Communities and Territories Development	Oleksiy Chernyshov	4 March 2020	3 November 2022
Ministry of Communities and Territories Development (restored)	Vitalii Bezghin	16 July 2026	Incumbent

Name of Ministry	Name of minister	Term of Office	
Name of Ministry	Name of minister	Start	End
Ministry of Public Housing and Utilities	Oleksandr Popov	March 21, 2007	December 18, 2007
Ministry of Public Housing and Utilities	Oleksiy Kucherenko	December 18, 2007	March 11, 2010
Ministry of Public Housing and Utilities	Oleksandr Popov	March 11, 2010	June 17, 2010
Ministry of Public Housing and Utilities	Yuriy Khivrych	June 17, 2010	December 9, 2010
Ministry of Public Housing and Utilities	see Ministry of Regional Development, Construction, and Public Housing and Utilities		

== See also ==
- Cabinet of Ministers of Ukraine
- List of historic reserves in Ukraine - Complete list of all State Preserves of Cultural Heritage
