= Hennadiy Zubko =

Ukrainian politician

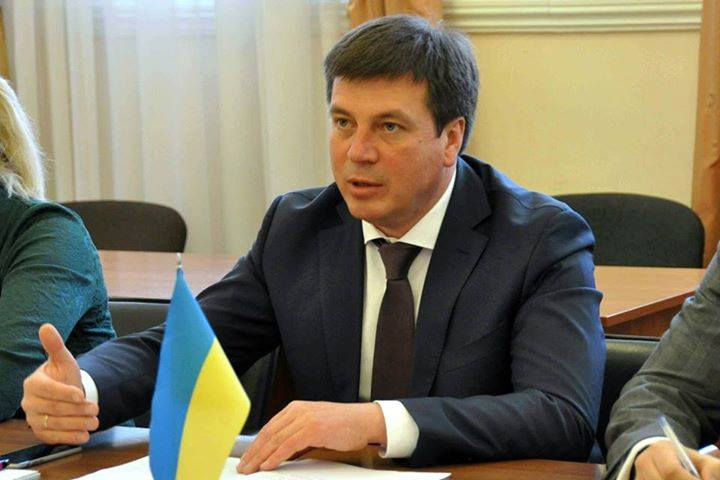
Hennadiy Hryhorovych Zubko

Hennadiy Hryhorovych Zubko (Ukrainian: Геннадій Григорович Зубко) is a Ukrainian politician. From 2 December 2014 until 29 August 2019, he was the Deputy Prime Minister — Minister for Regional Development, Construction and Housing, serving in the second Yatsenyuk Government of Arseniy Yatsenyuk and in the Groysman Government of Volodymyr Groysman.

== Education ==
He graduated from the Kyiv Polytechnic Institute, specializing in "Automated control systems", engineering, in 1991. He took courses in "Investment and financial management in the construction industry" (Northwestern University, Illinois, Chicago, 2003) and "Innovative Management" (2006). He received his MBA from the National University of "Kyiv-Mohyla Academy", Kyiv Mohyla Business School, in 2007.

== Career ==
- 1988–1990 — software engineer for Zhytomyr regional production and technical communications department.
- 1991–1992 — engineer-programmer for the NYVA enterprise, Zhytomyr.
- 1992–1994 — Commercial Director of the SERHII production company, Zhytomyr.
- 1994–1997 — Director of JSC the Mayak, Zhytomyr.
- 1997–2001 — Director of JSC the TANTAL, Zhytomyr.
- 2001–2002 — JSC "LINOS" (Lysychansk refinery), project manager for the construction of high-octane gasoline line.
- 2003–2007 — head of department on coordination of activities of organizations on the installation of metal structures of the State Corporation "Ukrmontazhspecstroj", Kyiv.
- 2002–2010 — JSC "Zhytomyr Plant of Protective Structures ", Deputy Chairman, Zhytomyr.
- 2010–2012 — JSC "Zhytomyr plant protective constructions", chairman of the board.
- December 2012 — Member of Parliament of Ukraine, First Deputy Chairman of the Verkhovna Rada Committee on Construction, Urban Development, Housing and Utilities and Regional Policy.
- From 10 June 2014 — First Deputy Head of the Presidential Administration of Ukraine.
- 2 December 2014 — appointed Vice Prime Minister, Minister of Regional Development, Construction, Housing and Utilities of Ukraine by the Verkhovna Rada of Ukraine.
- 2 December 2014 — 29 August 2019 — Vice Prime Minister - Minister of Regional Development, Construction and Housing.

== Ukraine cabinet ==
As Deputy Prime Minister of Regional Development, Construction and Utilities of Ukraine, Zubko conducted reforms for decentralization and energy efficiency, construction reforms, and the introduction of market relations in the housing sector. During the year of implementing these reforms, legislative acts were adopted, and new programs were introduced and funded.

During the investigation of the MH17 incident, Zubko defended the decision not to close Ukraine airspace at elevations exceeding 9751 meters over the zone in question. The elevation reported by Dmytro Babeichuk, head of the air-traffic control service, was 7900 meters. Sixty-one airlines continued to fly over the area above the elevation the International Civil Aviation Organization recommended be closed for minimum safety. The Dutch Safety Board also acknowledged that closing the airspace over the conflict area could have prevented the incident altogether.

Zubko headed Ukraine's "Interagency Commission" investigating the crash, following Volodymyr Hroysman. A Ukrainian delegation assisted in a three-day reconstruction of the crash. Zubko authorised relinquishing the report on the incident to the Dutch investigators in order to maintain Ukraine's transparency on 23 July 2014. The draft report included Ukraine's recommendations to improve ICAO regulations regarding flights over conflict areas.

While the final report of the incident stated that the missile had been "launched from an area controlled by Russian-backed separatists", Zubko went further, stating that the incident was a terrorist attack.

== Decentralization ==
The decentralization reform implemented under the leadership of Hennadiy Zubko involves changes in education, health, social policy, public administration, local authorities, the development of urban infrastructure, and energy efficiency measures.

In December 2014, the Budget and Tax Codes were amended, and fiscal decentralization took place in Ukraine. Due to these changes, local budgets in 2015 were in surplus. Fiscal decentralization has allowed for the provision of more than US$24 billion to local budgets. Using the State Regional Development Fund, the government financed 784 infrastructure projects with US$2.7 billion.

On 1 September 2015, the Law of Ukraine No.320-VIII, "On Amendments to Certain Legislative Acts of Ukraine on Decentralization of Powers in the field of Architectural Control and Improvement of Town Planning Legislation" came into force. It reforms the system of state architectural control and transmits the functions and powers from the national to the local level.

On 2 February 2015, the Law of Ukraine "On voluntary association of local communities" was adopted, after which, 6,300 territorial communities initiated their association.

159 associated communities took part in local elections on 25 October 2015. They elected their heads and local authorities. Since 2016, they have had direct budgetary relations with the central budget.

In 2016, it is planned to give ₴1.4 billion from the State Budget for subsidies to support joint local communities.

The Ministry of Regional Development has developed criteria for assessing the implementation of the state policy of regional state administrations: 27 indicators at 6 directions on a quarterly basis and 64 indicators at 12 directions each year.

The Ministry has also developed an Action Plan on implementing during 2015–2017 the National Strategy of Regional Development for the period until 2020, which was approved by the Cabinet of Ministers. The document tries to eliminate inter-regional socio-economic disparities, and stimulate economic activity and employment among residents.

The government has provided contributions to the State Fund for Regional Development in the amount of ₴2.9 billion for the support of 844 development area investment projects.

The international community assists the Regional Development Ministry in conducting decentralization. In particular, the EU planned to allocate €90 million for implementing the decentralization reform.

78% of the laws for decentralization have already been adopted, and the other 22% are awaiting amendments to the Constitution by the Ukrainian MPs.

== Energy Efficiency ==
On 3 September 2014, the Cabinet of Ministers approved the Action Plan for the implementation of the European Parliament and the Council of the EU Directive 2009/28/EU "On promoting the use of energy produced from the renewable energy sources".

On 1 October 2014, the Cabinet of Ministers also approved the National Action Plan on Renewable Energy for the period until 2020 and Action Plan for its implementation. Implementing the plan will increase the share of energy produced from alternative fuel from 4.5% in 2013 to 11% in 2020.

On 28 September 2015, the Governmental Committee approved the draft Resolution of the Cabinet of Ministers of Ukraine "On National Action Plan on energy efficiency for the period until 2020".

The Law of Ukraine "On energy efficiency of buildings", which provides energy efficiency of buildings in accordance with the EU requirements, was drafted as well.

"Urban Infrastructure" project was launched for the allocation of $140 million. The project was aimed at implementing measures to improve energy efficiency, reduce water losses and settle the day-night water supply in several cities.

Under the initiative of the Regional Development Ministry, the state now compensates for part of the energy efficiency loans and continued to do this in 2016.

48 programs were adopted, providing for the compensation of loan interests under the energy efficiency measures. 13 programs are of regional character, 16 are for districts and 19 are for cities. As of 9 November 2015, since the start of the State Program on Energy Efficiency for the reimbursement of "warm" loans, ₴111.7 million was transferred from the state budget. About 60,000 families participated in the program. Banks issued energy-efficient loans worth ₴950.9 million.

The concept of the Energy Efficiency Fund – S2I was drafted to be launched in 2016.

Today the share of renewable sources in the total energy balance of Ukraine is 3.45%. The reform program envisaged by the government will increase it to 30% by 2030.

== Construction Reform ==
The Ministry of Regional Development, led by Hennadiy Zubko, drafted a Decree "On the reallocation of governmental expenditures for the Ministry of Regional Development, Construction and Housing in 2015". It provided for the allocation of ₴10.6 million to the budget for affordable housing.

== Social and political activities ==
- 2006–2010 — deputy of the Zhytomyr City Council of V convocation.
- 2010–2012 — deputy of the Zhytomyr City Council of VI convocation.
- 2010–2012 — head of the "Front of Changes" faction in the Zhytomyr Oblast Council.
- 2010–2012 — member of the Standing Committee on Budget and Municipal Property in the Zhytomyr Oblast Council.
- 2010–present — member of the Presidium of Zhytomyr NGO "Council of business leaders and entrepreneurs of Zhytomyr."
- May 2012 – present — head of the Zhytomyr regional election staff of the united opposition of "Batkivschyna" All-Ukrainian Union.
- 12 December 2012 – present — member of the Verkhovna Rada (Ukraine's national parliament) elected on behalf of the All-Ukrainian Union "Batkivschyna" (single-mandate constituency No. 62); First Deputy Chairman of the Verkhovna Rada Committee on Construction, Urban Development, Housing and Regional Policy; member of the counting commission.
- 10 June – 2 December 2014 — First Deputy Head of the Presidential Administration.
- 2 December 2014 – 29 August 2019 — Vice Prime Minister of Ukraine - Minister of Regional Development, Construction and Housing of Ukraine.

== Education and works ==
In 2009, he completed his PhD at the Ukrainian Research Institute "Proektstalkonstruktsiya named after V. Szymanovskyi", Kyiv.

In 2012, he defended his thesis on "Organizational and technical measures for improving reconstruction of stadiums" at the Kharkiv National University of Construction and Architecture at the Department of Technology and Building Structures. He is the author of more than 10 scientific papers, and he holds a PhD degree in technics.

== Awards ==
- Order of Danylo Halytskyi (awarded on 10 September 2009) — for the significant contribution to the socio-economic and cultural development of Zhytomyr, conscientious work and on the occasion of the 1125 anniversary of the city.
- Medal "For Distinction in Military Service", II degree (USSR, Decree No. 114, 28 August 1987).
- Medal "70 Years of the Armed Forces of the USSR" (Presidium of the Supreme Soviet of the USSR, Decree No. 84, 1988).

== Family ==
He has a wife, Lyudmila Mykolaivna, with whom they together have two children: Sergiy and Khrystyna.

Zubko and his family live in Kyiv's luxury neighbourhood Koncha-Zaspa. In May 2021, Ukrainian president Volodymyr Zelenskyy accused Zubko of living their cheaply paying only a "symbolic rent." Zubko claimed he paid 104,000 hryvnia (in 2021) per month.

== Income ==
For 2019, he declared a salary of ₴386,780, royalties and other payments under civil law contracts of ₴954,000, cars (a 1989 VAZ 2109, a 2006 Toyota RAV4, a 2018 Mercedes-Benz GLS 400, a 2016 BMW X5, and a 2010 BMW X6) and luxury wristwatches (Ulysse Nardin and Omega Speedmaster)
