= Hall of Remembrance, Kyiv =

Memorial site in Ukraine

Coordinates: 50.4428°N 30.4791°E

Hall of Remembrance
- Ukrainian: Меморіальний комплекс «Зала пам'яті»
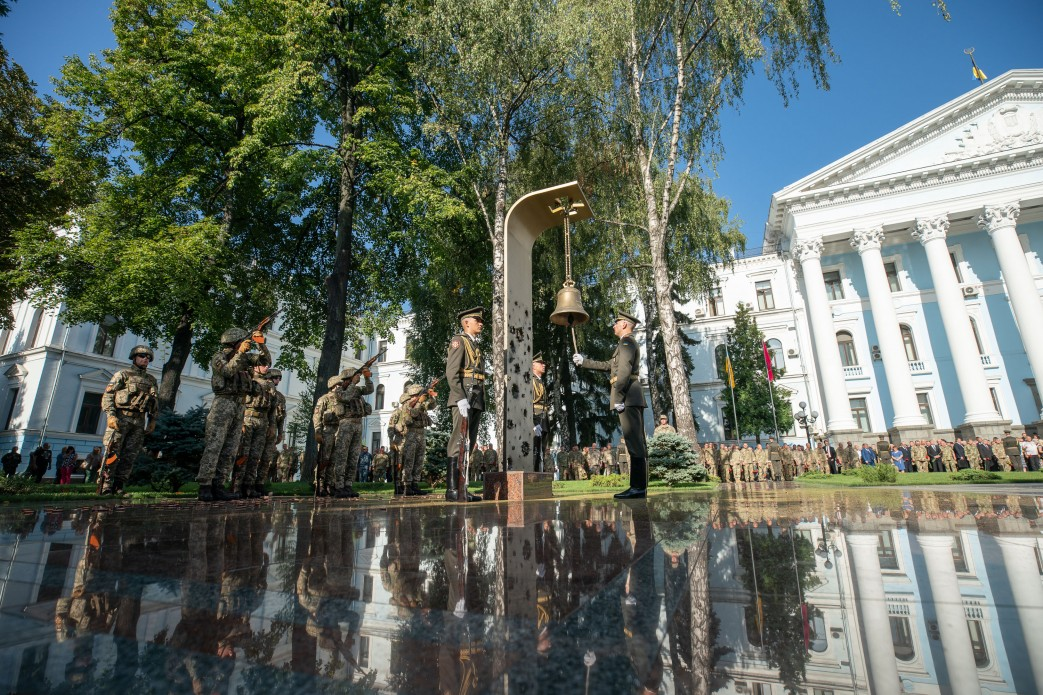
- Hall of Remembrance
- Location: Povitroflotskyi Avenue, 6, Kyiv, Ukraine
- Founded: October 14, 2018.
- Designation: Historic complex of Ukraine
- Established: October 14, 2018
- Type: Memorial site

The Hall of Remembrance (Ukrainian: Зала пам'яті, romanized: Zala pamyati) is a memorial complex in Kyiv, on the site of the Ministry of Defense of Ukraine. The complex honors the fallen servicemen of the Armed Forces of Ukraine and other Ukrainian military, law enforcement units, and volunteers who died in the battles for Ukraine.

== Description ==
The Hall of Remembrance opened on October 14, 2018, the Day of the Defender of Ukraine. The memorial complex was created with the assistance and initiative of the fifth President of Ukraine, Petro Poroshenko. The complex project was prepared by the Central Design Institute of the Ministry of Defense of Ukraine and built by servicemen of the State Special Transport Service of the Ministry of Defense of Ukraine.

It is located on the site of the Ministry of Defense of Ukraine. Within the complex, there is a hall with a book in memory of the fallen Ukrainian soldiers, a stele with a memorial bell, and a square for ceremonial events. The memorial commemorates members of the Armed Forces who died since 1992 in the battles for Ukraine or peacekeeping missions.

== Honored individuals ==
From August 29, 2019, the Hall of Remembrance will honor servicemen of the Armed Forces and service persons of all military and law enforcement units who died in the battles for Ukraine. On that day, the names of 223 militaries who died on August 29 in different years were read out during the ceremony. As of the beginning of 2020, 2,678 plaques with the names of the dead have been installed in the Hall of Remembrance. The concept and structure of the Book of Remembrance of Volunteer Defenders of Ukraine were agreed with representatives of the public, volunteer groups, the General Staff of the Ukrainian Volunteer Army, the Ukrainian Volunteer Corps "Right Sector", the OUN Volunteer Battalion, the Ministry of Defense and the Public Council.

In September 2020, the Order of the Ministry of Veterans "On the Book of Memory of Volunteers — Defenders of Ukraine who died in the battle for independence, sovereignty, and territorial integrity of Ukraine" was issued.

On March 15, 2021, the third Book of Remembrance was officially added in the Hall of Remembrance, which also mentions the names of Ukrainian volunteers.

== See also ==
- War in Donbas
- Russo-Ukrainian War
- Russian–Ukrainian information war
