= National Museum of the History of Ukraine in the Second World War =

Memorial complex in Kyiv, Ukraine

- Національний музей історії України у Другій світовій війні
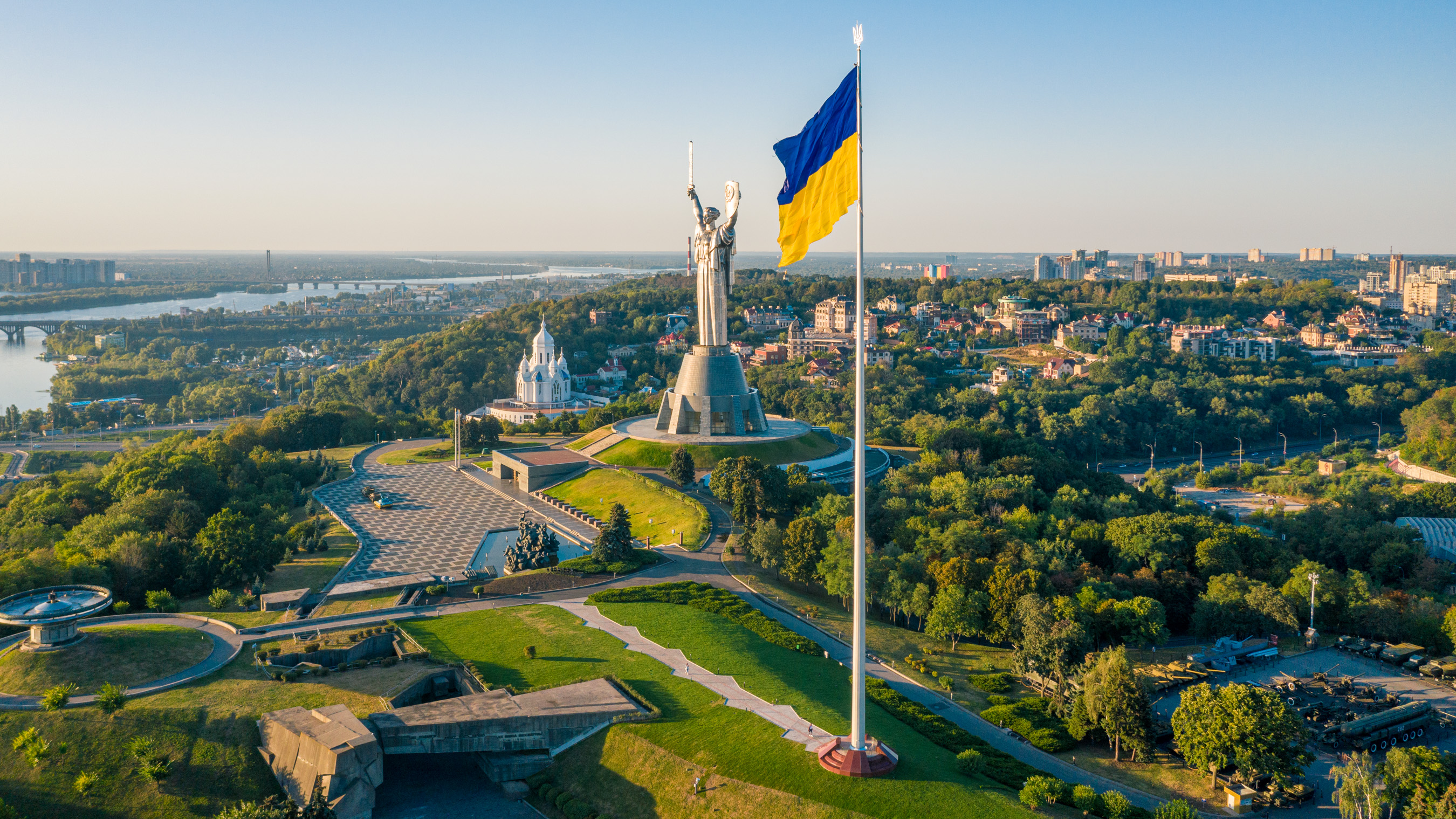
- Former name: National Museum of the History of the 1941–1945 Great Patriotic War
- Established: 9 May 1981; 45 years ago
- Location: Lavrska Str., 27, Kyiv, Ukraine
- Coordinates: 50.426634°N 30.5636°E
- Director: Yurii Savchuk
- Website: warmuseum.kyiv.ua

Immovable Monument of Local Significance of Ukraine
- Official name: Меморіальний комплекс «Національний музей історії України у Другій світовій війні» (Memorial complex "National Museum of the History of Ukraine in the Second World War")
- Reference no.: 991-Кв

The National Museum of the History of Ukraine in the Second World War (Ukrainian: Національний музей історії України у Другій світовій війні) (Note: romanized: Natsionalnyi muzei istorii Ukrainy u Druhii svitovii viini) is a memorial complex commemorating the German-Soviet War located in the southern outskirts of the Pecherskyi District of Kyiv, the capital of Ukraine, on the picturesque hills on the right-bank of the Dnipro River.

The museum was moved twice before ending up in the current location, where it was ceremonially opened on May 9 (Victory Day) in 1981 by the Soviet leader Leonid Brezhnev. On 21 June 1996, the museum was accorded its current status of the National Museum by the special decree signed by Leonid Kuchma, the then-President of Ukraine.

It is one of the largest museums in Ukraine (with over 300,000 exhibits) centered on the 62-metre tall Mother Ukraine statue, which has become one of the best-recognized landmarks of Kyiv. The museum has been attended by over 21 million visitors.

== Memorial complex ==
The memorial complex covers the area of 10 hectares (approximately 24.7 acres) on the hill, overlooking the Dnieper River. It contains the giant bowl "The Flame of Glory", a site with World War II military equipment, and the "Hero Cities". This "Alley of the Hero Cities" displayed all the Hero Cities in the Soviet Union; until 27 December 2024 when the names of Russian and Belarusian cities were removed.

One of the museums also displays the armaments used by the Soviet army post World War II. The sculptures in the alley depict the defence of the Soviet borders from the 1941 German invasion, the Nazi occupation, partisan struggle, devoted work on the home front, and the 1943 Battle of the Dnieper.

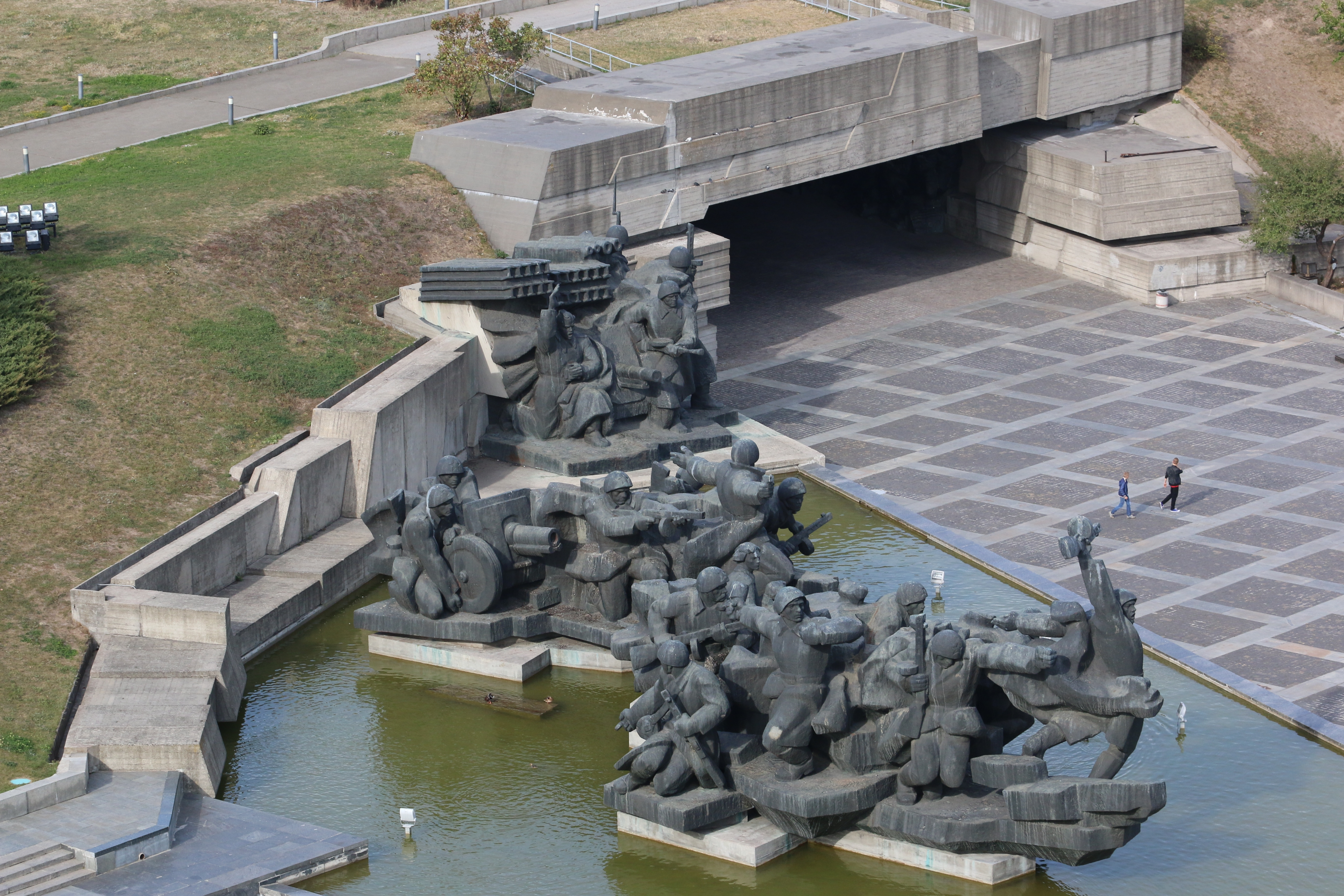
The monument "Crossing of the Dnieper"

Following the 2022 Russian invasion of Ukraine the museum underwent thematical changes. The museum's leadership stated in March 2024 it intended "to get rid of traces of the Soviet narrative about the myth of the "Great Patriotic War".

== Mother Ukraine monument ==
The monumental sculpture of Mother Ukraine (Україна-Мати), built by Yevgeny Vuchetich and Vasyl Borodai, stands 62 metres tall upon the museum building with the overall structure measuring 102 m and weighing 530 tons. The sword in the statue's right hand is 16 m long, weighing 9 tons, with the left hand holding up a 13 m by 8 m shield with the coat of arms of Ukraine (formerly the emblem of the Soviet Union). The memorial hall of the museum displays marble plaques with carved names of more than 11,600 soldiers and over 200 workers of the home-front honored during the war with the title of the Hero of the Soviet Union and the Hero of Socialist Labor. On the hill beneath the museum, the traditional flower shows are held.

== Name change ==
Until July 2015, the official name of the museum was the National Museum of the History of the 1941–1945 Great Patriotic War (Національний музей історії Великої Вітчизняної війни 1941—1945 років). In April 2015, the Verkhovna Rada outlawed the term "Great Patriotic War" as well as Nazi and communist symbols, street names, and monuments. On 16 May 2015, Minister of Culture Vyacheslav Kyrylenko announced that the museum would change its name, and this was done two months later.

== Awards ==
In May 2023, the museum received the Judges' Special Recognition Prize at the Museum + Heritage Awards (London, UK) for the exhibition project "Ukraine — Crucifixion" (curator — Dr. Jurii Savchuk, artist — Anton Logov) and professional resilience in the times of warfare.

== Gallery ==
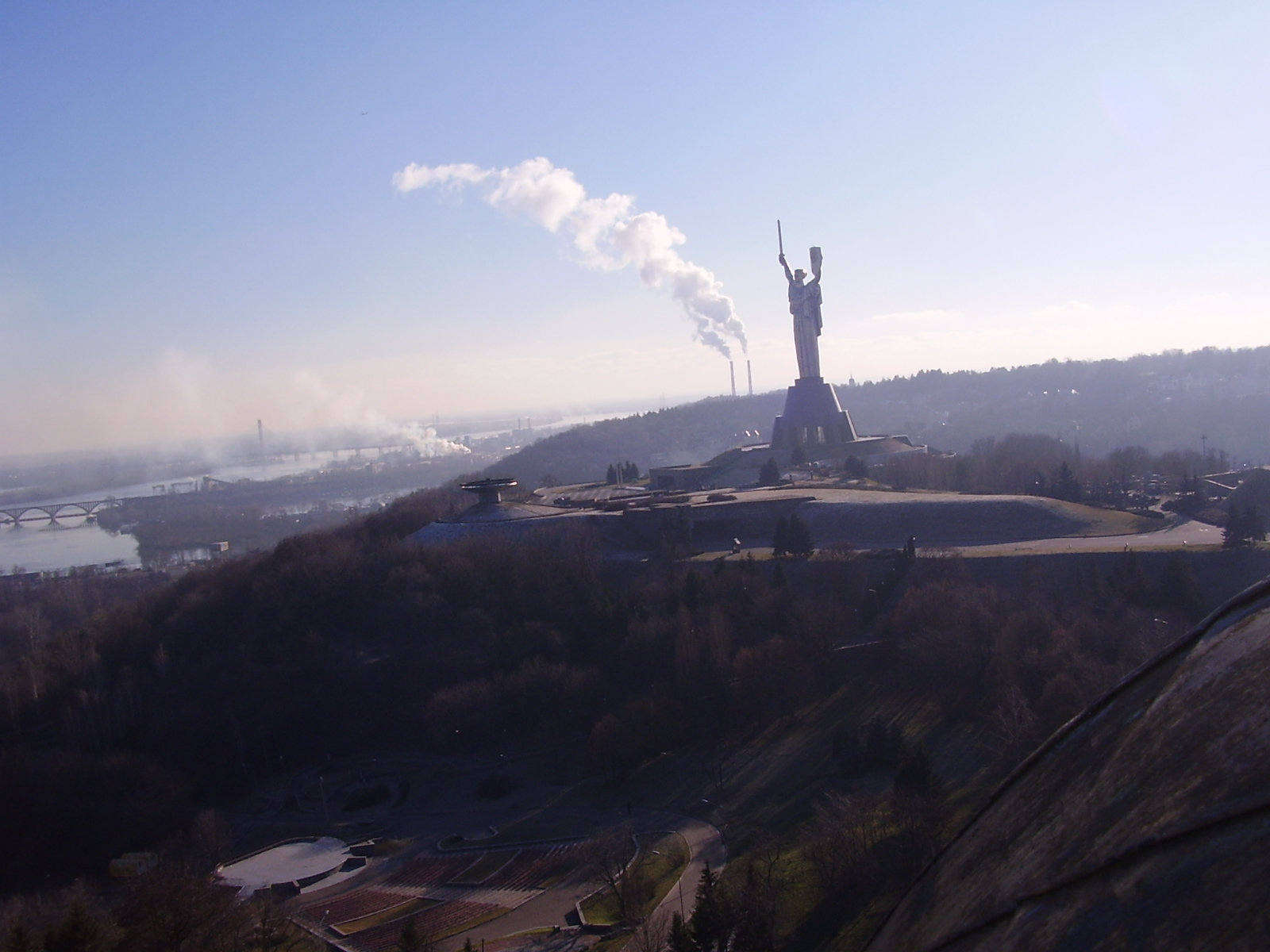

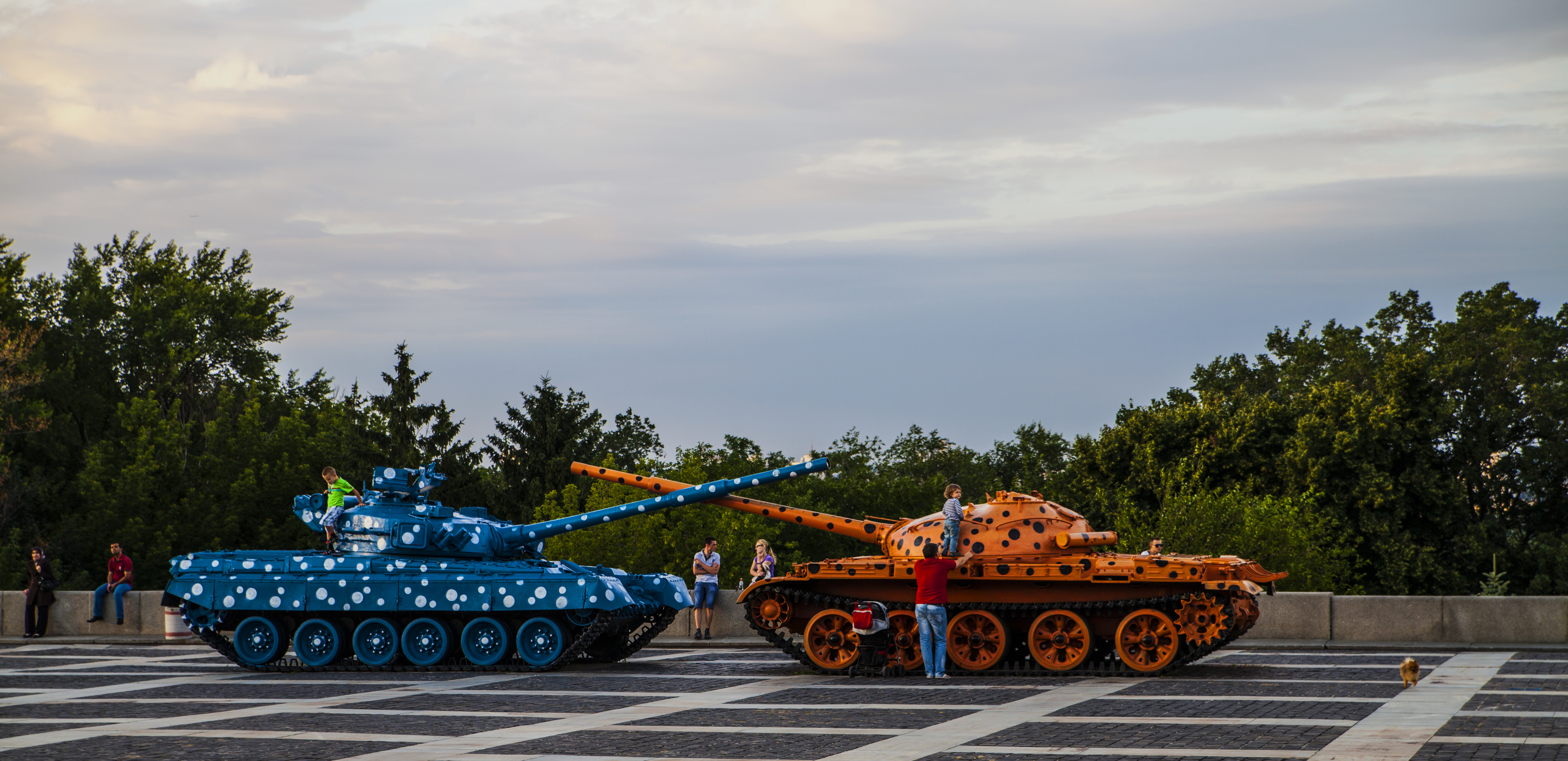

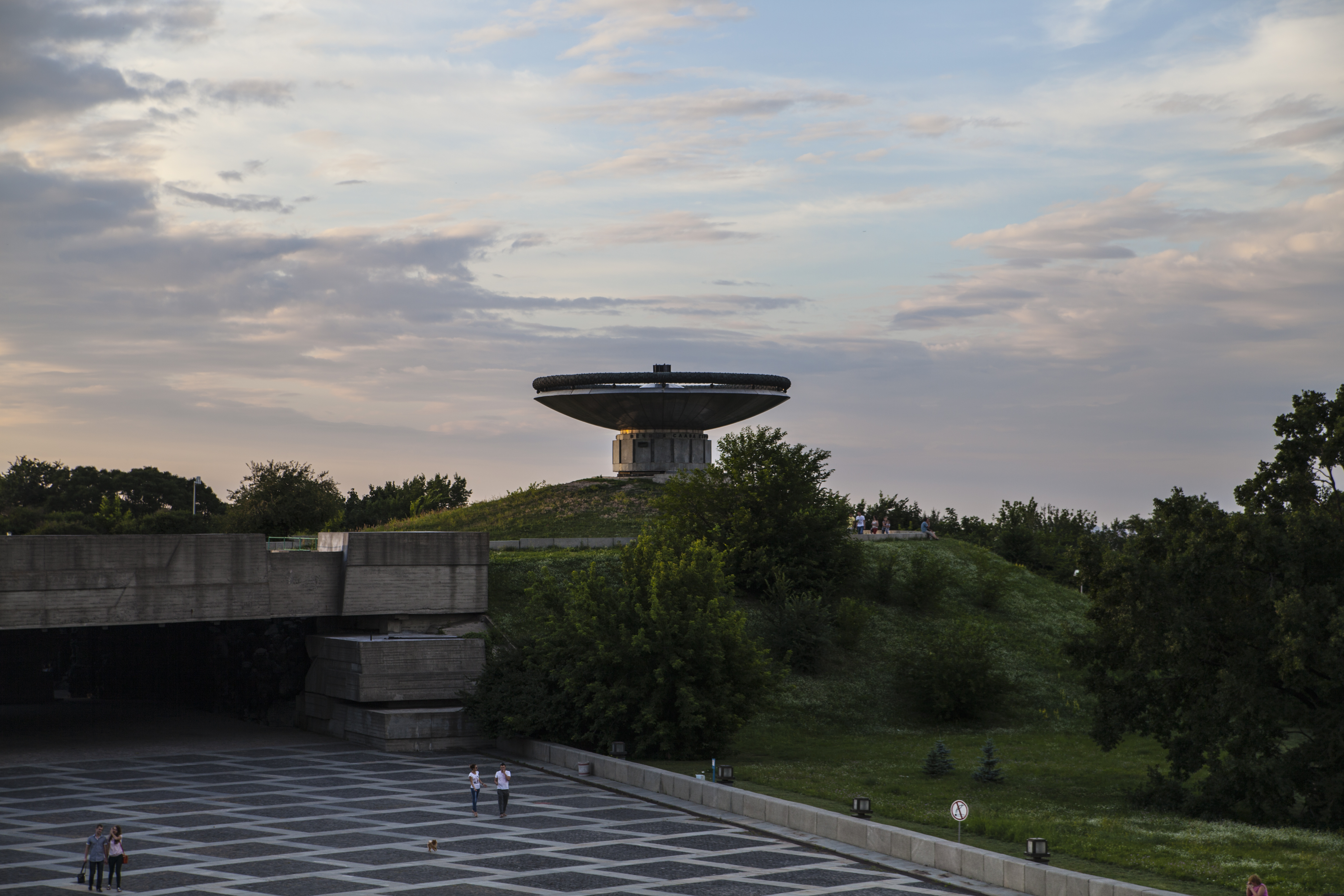

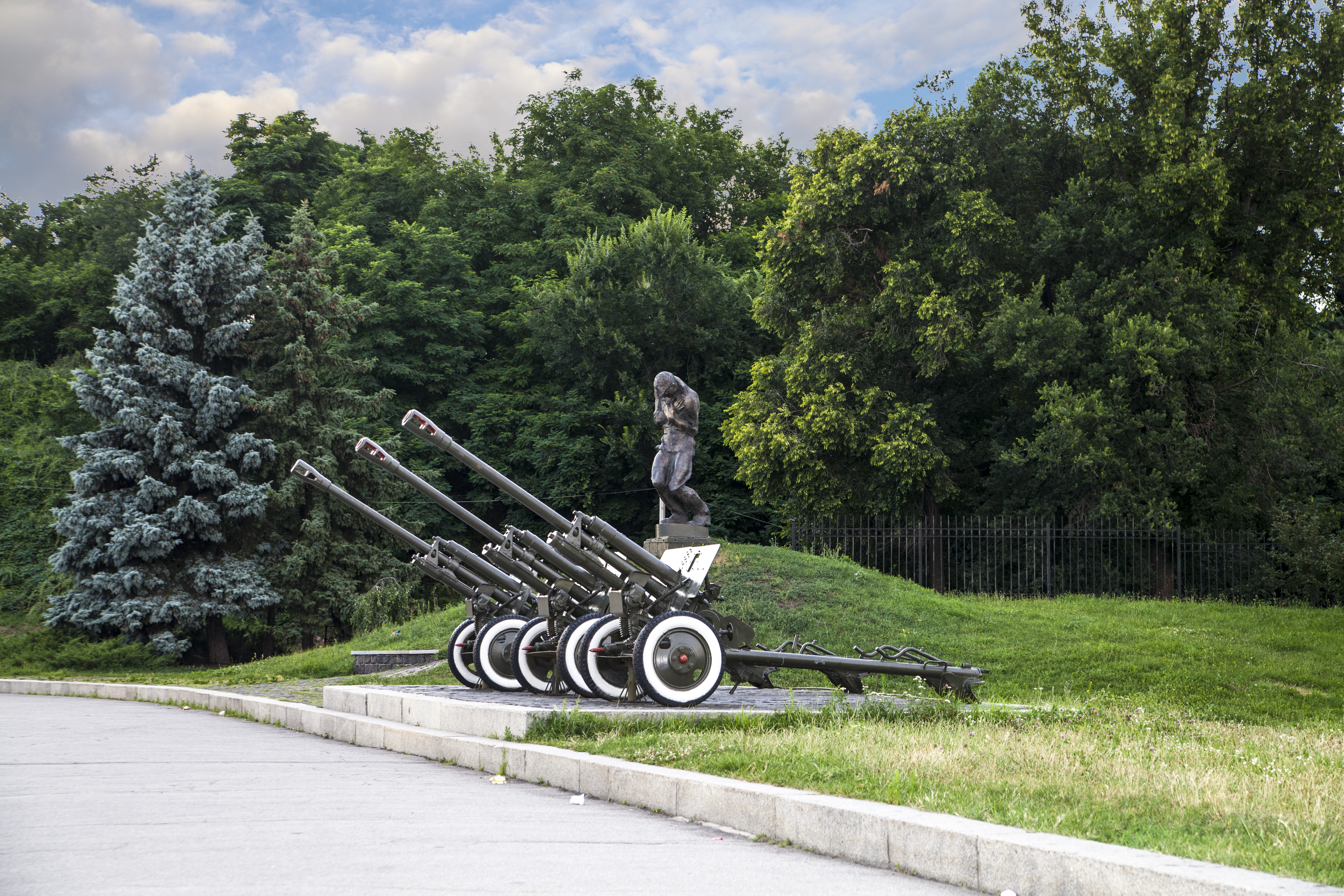

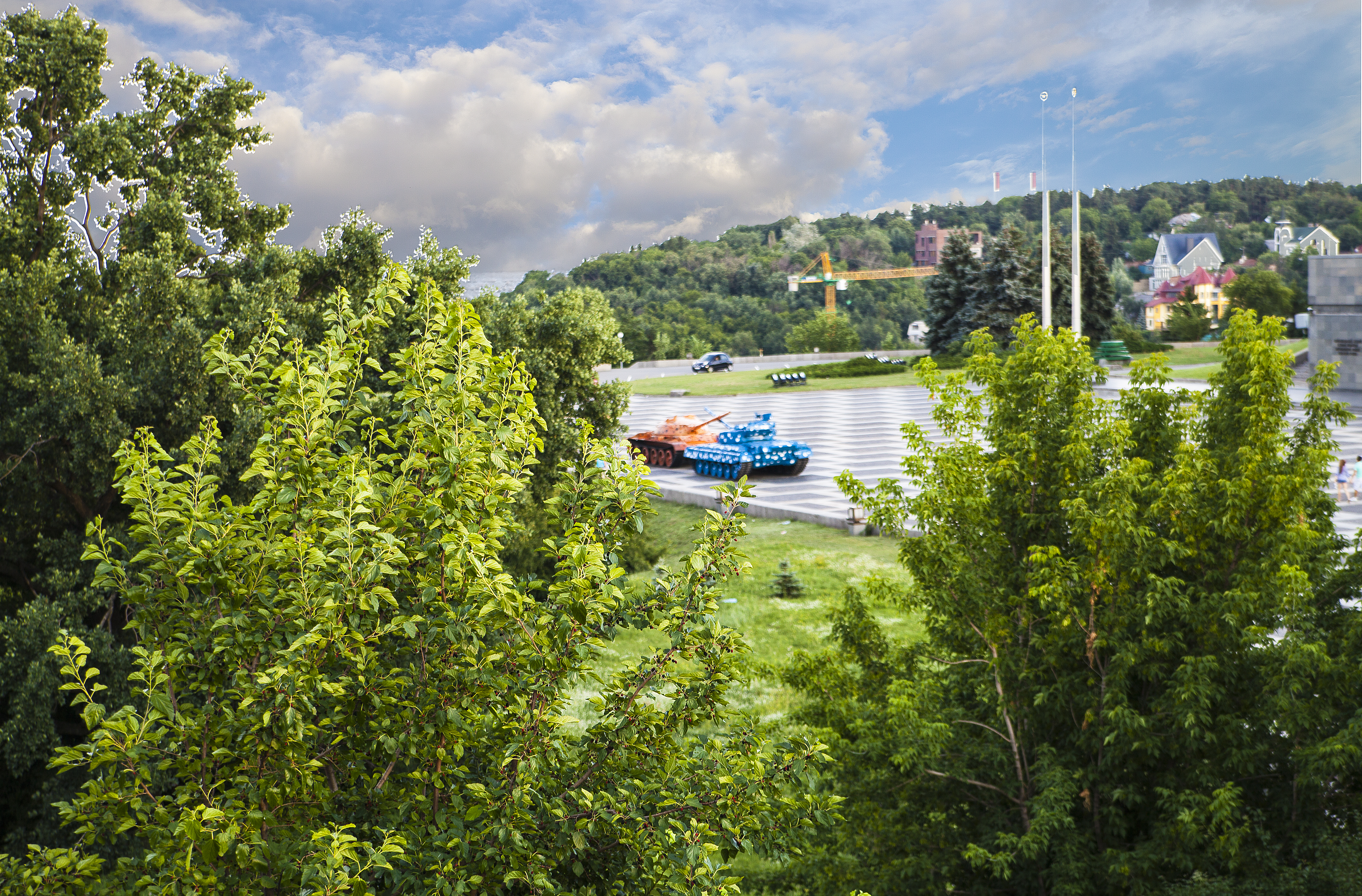

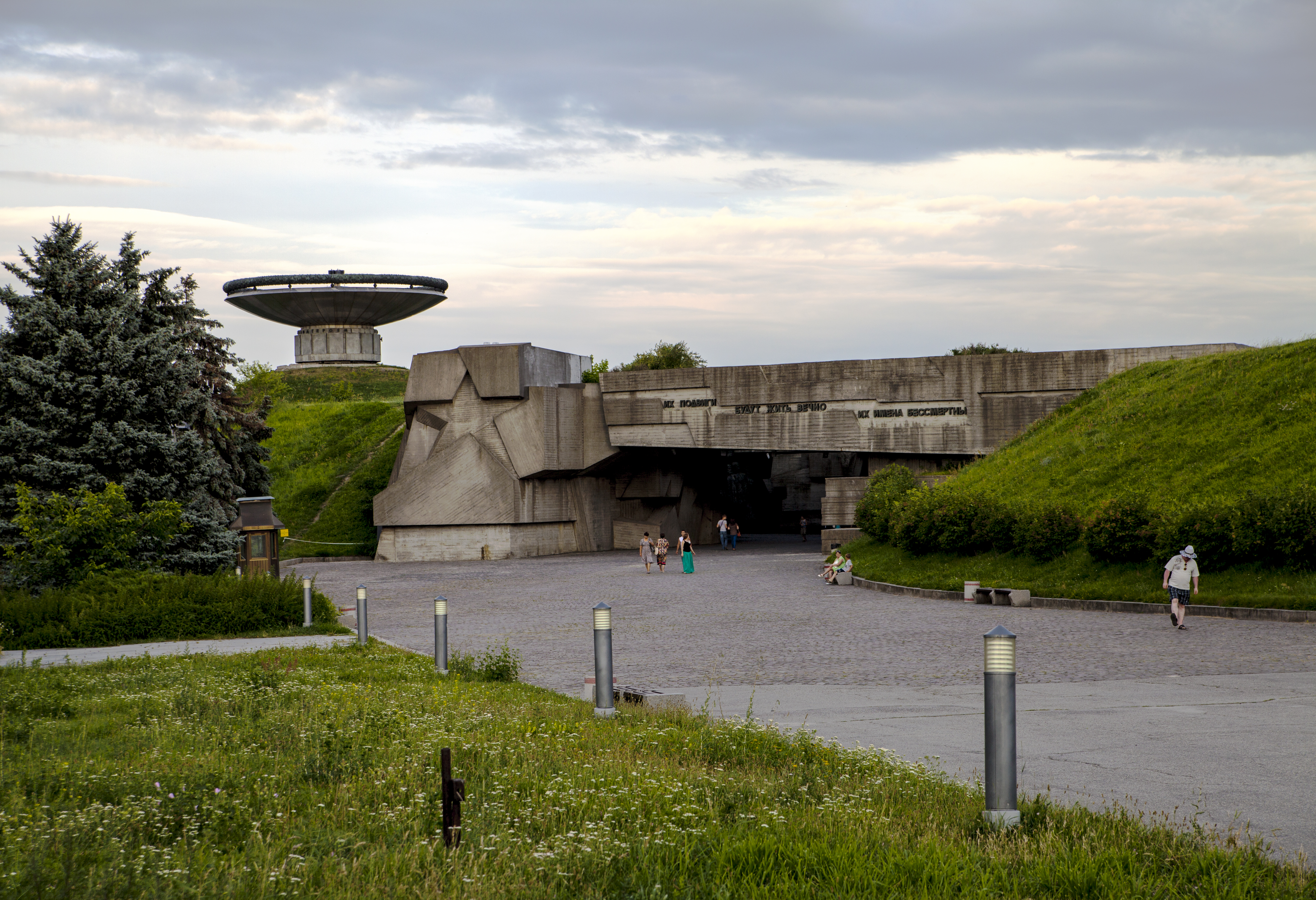

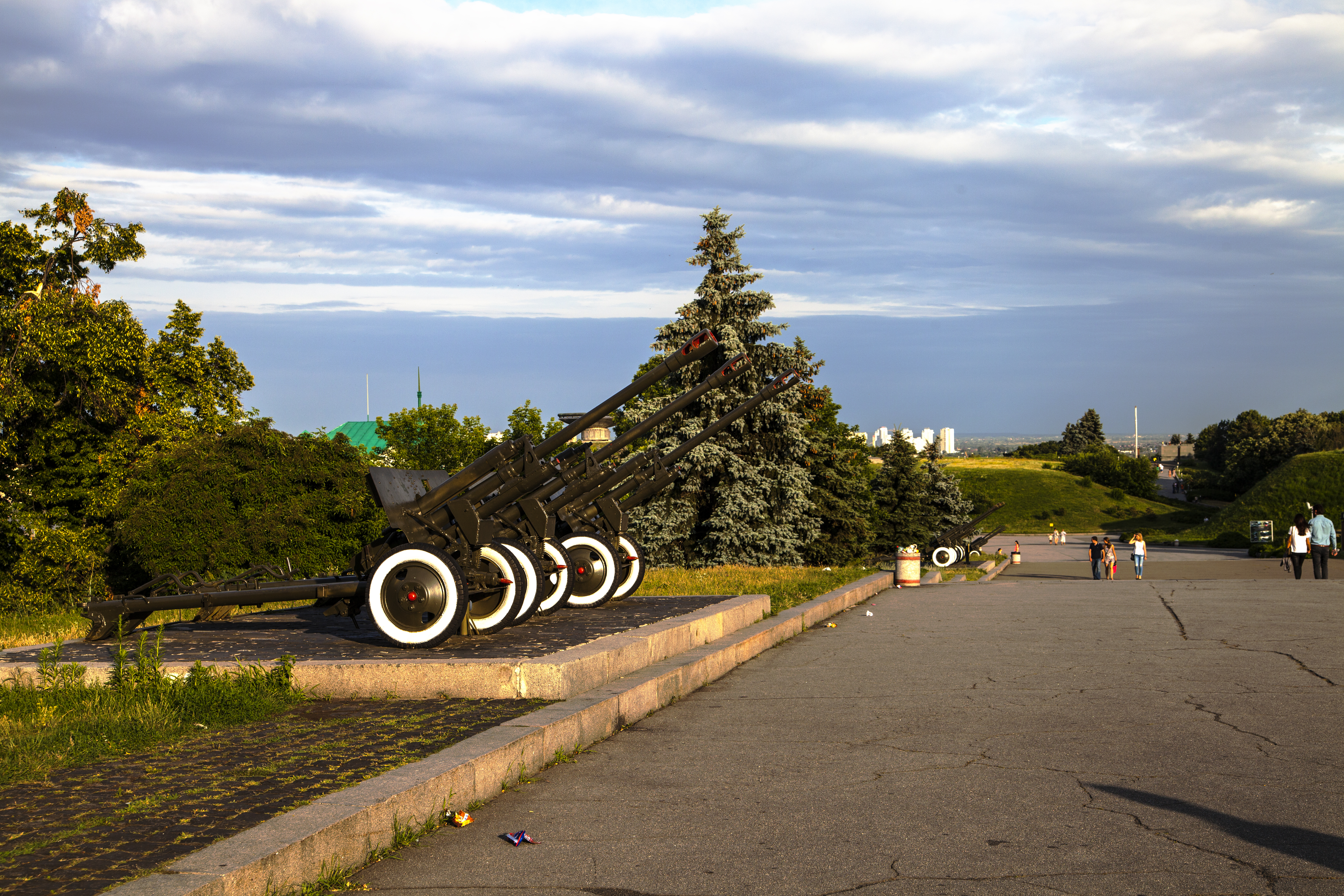

== See also ==
- Mamayev Kurgan
