= Vasyl Borodai =

Ukrainian sculptor (1917–2010)

- Василь Бородай
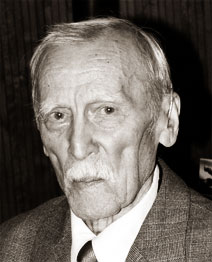
- Born: Vasyl Zakharovych Borodai; 18 August 1917; Yekaterinoslav, Russian Empire (now Dnipro, Ukraine)
- Died: 19 April 2010 (aged 92); Kyiv, Ukraine
- Occupation: Sculptor
- Awards: Shevchenko Prize (1968)

Vasyl Zakharovych Borodai (Ukrainian: Василь Захарович Бородай; 18 August 1917 – 19 April 2010) was a Ukrainian sculptor, painter and parliamentary. He was known for his public monuments. Borodai was awarded the title, People's Artist of the USSR, and was academician of the Academy of Arts of the Soviet Union and Ukraine.

== Biography ==
Vasyl Zakharovych Borodai was born on 18 August 1917 in Yekaterynoslav (now Dnipro), Ukraine (then part of the Russian Republic). He was a World War II veteran. While studying in Kyiv Arts Institute in 1947–1953, Borodai was a student of Ukrainian sculptor Mykhailo Lysenko.

Borodai's daughter was painter Halyna Borodai, and he was a guardian of another Ukrainian sculptor Alexander Kostetsky who early lost his father.

He died on 19 April 2010 in Kyiv.

== Gallery ==
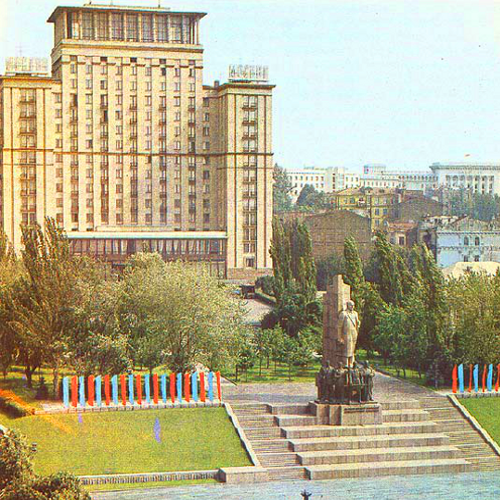
Monument of the Great October Revolution (1977)

Mother Ukraine Monument (1981)

Cultural offices
Preceded by Vasyl Kasiyan	Head of the National society of painters of Ukraine; 1968–1982	Succeeded by Oleksandr Skoblikov
