= Bryukhovetsky =

Bryukhovetsky or Briukhovetskyi (masculine), Briukhovetska (Ukrainian) or Bryukhovetskaya (Russian) (feminine) may refer to:

People

- Daria Briukhovetska, née Dolgorukova (1639—1669), Ukrainian Hetmansha by marriage to Hetman Ivan Briukhovetsky
- Ivan Briukhovetsky (Bryukhovetsky) (1623—1668), Ukrainian Hetman
- Larysa Briukhovetska (born 1949), Ukrainian film critic, editor in chief of Kino Teatr Magazine
- Vyacheslav Briukhovetskyi (1947–2026), Hero of Ukraine, Rector and President (1991—2007), since 2007 Honour President of Kyiv Mohyla Academy

Places

- Bryukhovetsky District, a district in Krasnodar Krai, Russia
- Bryukhovetskaya, a rural locality (a stanitsa) in Bryukhovetsky District of Krasnodar Krai, Russia
