= EERC =

EERC may refer to:

- Economics Education and Research Consortium
- Educational Enrichment for Romanian Children
- Energy and Environmental Research Center
- Engineer Enlisted Reserve Corps
- Eton Excelsior Rowing Club
