= Vyacheslav Briukhovetskyi =

Ukrainian literary scholar (1947–2026)

Hero of Ukraine Vyacheslav Briukhovetsky
- В'ячеслав Брюховецький
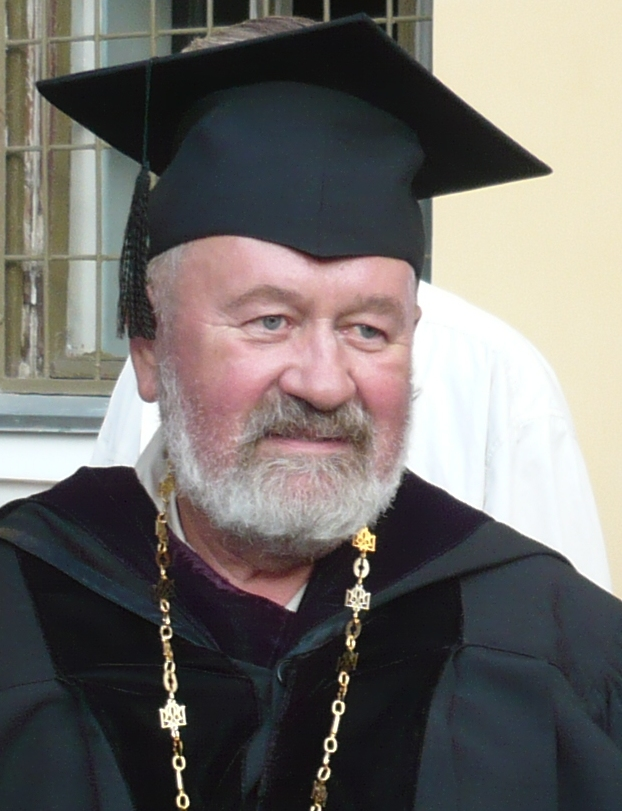
- Briukhovetskyi in 2009

President of the National University of Kyiv-Mohyla Academy
- In office 1991–2007
- Preceded by: Position established
- Succeeded by: Serhiy Kvit

Personal details
- Born: 14 July 1947 Dzaudzhikau, North Ossetian ASSR, Russian SFSR, Soviet Union
- Died: 12 November 2026 (aged 79)
- Party: Our Ukraine (2006); People's Movement of Ukraine (1989–1990); Communist Party of the Soviet Union
- Spouse: Larysa Briukhovetska née Kysil (married 1971)
- Children: Oksana (b.1973); Olha (b.1976)
- Education: Taras Shevchenko State University
- Occupation: Literary critic, pedagogue, political activist, chess player
- Academic title: Doctor

Vyacheslav Stepanovych Briukhovetskyi (Ukrainian: В'ячеслав Степанович Брюховецький; 14 July 1947 – 12 November 2026) was a Ukrainian literary scholar, pedagogue and civic activist, who served as the first president of the National University of Kyiv-Mohyla Academy. A fellow of the National Academy of Sciences of Ukraine, he was also active in politics and became one of the founders of the People's Movement of Ukraine.

== Life and career ==
=== Early life ===
Vyacheslav Briukhovetskyi was born on 14 July 1947 in Dzaudzhikau (now Vladikavkaz, North Ossetia), to a Ukrainian family. Soon after Vyacheslav's birth, they moved to Cherkasy, where he spent his childhood.

Although the family spoke Ukrainian language at home, as a child Vyacheslav attended a Russian-language school, and his parents would generally speak Russian in public, which was typical in Ukraine at the time. As a schoolboy, Briukhovetskyi dreamed to become a footballer, but had to abandon playing due to an injury. During his teenage years, he learned English language after trying to read stories by Hemingway with the help of a vocabulary. He was also a passionate chess player, and participated in the European correspondence chess championship as a member of the Ukrainian team. In 1969 Briukhovetskyi played in the final tournament of Cherkasy Oblast chess championship.

=== Scientific career ===
In 1966 Briukhovetskyi graduated from the Smila food industry technical school with the qualification of technician. He initially planned to enter the Moscow State Institute of International Relations, but eventually decided to stay in Ukraine and become a journalist. He enrolled into the journalism faculty at the Taras Shevchenko State University in Kyiv, graduating with honours in 1974. During his studies, Briukhovetsky took part in the publication of a samvydav newspaper, two issues of which were printed in 1971. Influenced by Alexander Solzhenitsyn's One Day in the Life of Ivan Denisovich, he once travelled to Mstislav Rostropovich's dacha near Moscow, where the author was staying at the time; however, Solzhenitsyn refused to receive the young student, fearing that he could have been a KGB provocateur.

Starting from the late 1970s, Briukhovetskyi worked at the editorial office of Literaturna Ukrayina ("Literary Ukraine") newspaper, replacing the previously arrested Valeriy Marchenko. In 1980 he received a candidate's degree in pedagogics in Leningrad, and in 1986 defended his doctoral thesis at the Institute of Literature of the Ukrainian Academy of Sciences. From 1980, he was a fellow of the Taras Shevchenko Institute of Literature at the Academy of Sciences of Ukrainian SSR, and in 1988-1991 headed the department of literary theory at the establishment. Among his colleagues there were Tamara Hundorova and Solomiya Pavlychko.

Throughout his career, Briukhovetskyi published over 400 scientific works and literary-critical publications, including monographs dedicated to Lina Kostenko and Mykola Zerov. In 1989 Briukhovetskyi was invited to lecture at Rutgers University, and toured the United States, meeting with the local Ukrainian diaspora. In 1990 he moved to Canada after an invitation by the University of Manitoba. He returned to Ukraine in early 1991, soon after the Revolution on Granite.

=== President of Kyiv Mohyla Academy ===
In 1991 Briukhovetskyi initiated the revival of Kyiv-Mohyla Academy, becoming its first president. Collection of funds for the university's reestablishment was conducted by the Ukrainian diaspora in North America and supported by president Leonid Kravchuk and the Cabinet of Ministers of Ukraine. According to his own claim, Briukhovetskyi won the right to use the first classroom of the revived academy in a chess game against the Soviet admiral who headed the naval school located in the building at the time. Among early patrons of the university were Harvard professor Omeljan Pritsak and first minister of defence of Ukraine Kostiantyn Morozov.

During Briukhovetskyi's tenure, the academy adopted Western educational standards, introducing the degrees of Bachelor and Master of Arts (1996), and providing free choice of subjects to students. Kyiv-Mohyla Academy also pioneered the conduct of entry tests for applicants, which became the base for introduction of External independent evaluation in Ukrainian universities. Briukhovetskyi personally introduced a zero tolerance policy in respect to corruption, and offered applicants who attempted to bribe him to transfer their money to a charity foundation created in support of the academy. In 2008 a doctoral school of philosophy was opened at the university. Kyiv Mohyla Academy was also the first school in Ukraine to introduce a system of personnel employment based on individual contracts.

Under Briukhovetskyi, Kyiv-Mohyla Academy put an emphasis on the development of self-government, mutual respect, academic freedom and critical thought among its students. The university was an active participant in the Orange Revolution and Revolution of Dignity and participated in a consortium for protection of university autonomy. In 1993 the academy introduced its own mock currency, named Briukh (Брюх) in honour of its rector, and jokingly presented it as "financial aid" to president Kravchuk. In 1995 Briukhovetskyi approved the establishment of a modern arts centre at the academy, managed by Marta Kuzma and funded by George Soros.

=== Retirement ===
In 2007 Briukhovetskyi retired from his post as rector and was succeeded by Serhiy Kvit. He retained the title of honorary president of Kyiv-Mohyla Academy, and also headed the international foundation supporting the university. After his retirement, Briukhovetsky played a major role in the adoption of the new education law.

=== Personal life and death ===
In 1971 Briukhovetskyi married Larysa Kysil, a fellow student of his faculty, who contributed to his publications and would later work as an editor of the Ukrainian Soviet Encyclopedia. In 1973 the couple welcomed their first daughter Oksana. Their second daughter Olha was born in 1976. Oksana studied at the Lviv National Academy of Arts and later worked as an art curator. Olha taught culturology at the Kyiv-Mohyla Academy and co-founded the university's Centre of Visual Culture.

Briukhovetskyi died on 12 November 2026, at the age of 79.

== Political involvement ==
As secretary of the party committee at the Institute of Literature, in 1989 Briukhovetskyi took part in organization of the inaugural congress of the People's Movement of Ukraine. Known for his careful attitude to political issues, he played a major role in preventing possible provocations during the congress by establishing communications with the KGB. During the 1990 election, Briukhovetskyi was offered a place among the People's Movement candidates, but declined the proposal in order to concentrate on educational activities.

In 2006 Briukhovetskyi was elected member of Kyiv City Council from Our Ukraine, but soon thereafter resigned from that position. He was also a member of the National Commission of Ukraine in UNESCO affairs.

== Awards and honours ==
In 2007, Briukhovetskyi was awarded the title Hero of Ukraine for his contribution to the development of national education. He was also a laureate of the Order of Merit 3rd rank (1997), Order of Merit of the Republic of Poland (2005) and Oleksa Hirnyk Prize.
