= Larysa Briukhovetska =

Ukrainian film critic

- Лариса Брюховецька
- Born: Larysa Kysil; 7 January 1949 (age 77); Liuboml Raion, Volyn Oblast, Ukrainian SSR, Soviet Union
- Education: Taras Shevchenko National University of Kyiv
- Occupation: Film critic
- Spouse: Vyacheslav Briukhovetskyi

Larysa Ivanivna Briukhovetska (Ukrainian: Лариса Іванівна Брюховецька, née Kysil; born 7 January 1949) is a Ukrainian film critic, film historian, and film scholar.

Briukhovetska was born in the village of Zapillia, Liuboml Raion, Volyn Oblast. Since 1991, Larysa Briukhovetska has served as the editor-in-chief of the Kino-Teatr magazine at the National University of Kyiv-Mohyla Academy (NaUKMA). She is also a senior lecturer at NaUKMA’s Department of Cultural Studies and heads the university’s Center for Cinematographic Studies. In April 2019, she became one of the 18 members of the Public Council under the State Film Agency of Ukraine.

== Education and career ==
Briukhovetska studied at the Faculty of Journalism at Taras Shevchenko National University of Kyiv from 1967 to 1972.

From 1974 to 1982, she worked as a scholarly editor for the Art section of the Ukrainian Soviet Encyclopedia. She also held editorial positions at the newspaper Uriadovyi Kurier and the magazine Kyiv.

Since 1988, she has been a member of the Ukrainian Association of Cinematographers.

In the early 1990s, she worked as a correspondent for the Cinema section of Vavilon-21 magazine.

Since 1994, she has been teaching at the National University of Kyiv-Mohyla Academy. In 1995, she became the editor-in-chief of Kino-Teatr magazine, founded at the initiative of her students.

Between 2000 and 2009, she served on the Expert Council of the State Film Agency of Ukraine. She was a member of the Taras Shevchenko National Prize Committee (2000–2004) and the Oleksandr Dovzhenko State Prize Committee (2004–2013).

She was elected to the Board of the Ukrainian Association of Cinematographers at its 7th (13th) Congress on October 25, 2016.

In March 2019, Briukhovetska was one of nine film experts on the selection committee tasked with appointing a new director for the Dovzhenko Film Studio.
