= Andriy Kozhemiakin =

Ukrainian politician and former security services officer

Andrii Kozhemiakin
- Андрій Кожем'якін
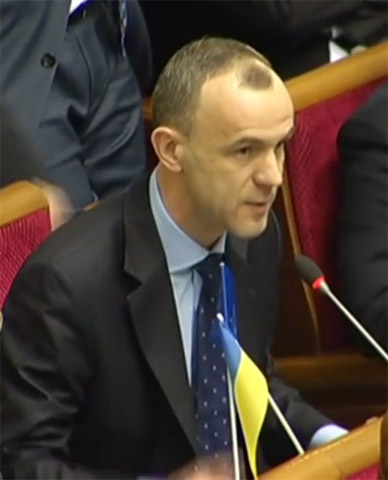
- Kozhemiakin in 2014

People's Deputy of Ukraine

9th convocation
- Incumbent
- Assumed office 29 August 2019
- Constituency: Fatherland, No.7

People's Deputy of Ukraine

5th convocation
- In office 25 May 2006 – 12 June 2007
- Constituency: Yulia Tymoshenko Bloc, No.25

6th convocation
- In office 23 November 2007 – 12 December 2012
- Constituency: Yulia Tymoshenko Bloc, No.23

7th convocation
- In office 12 December 2012 – 27 November 2014
- Constituency: Fatherland, No.13

8th convocation
- Incumbent
- Assumed office 27 November 2014
- Constituency: Fatherland, No.13

Personal details
- Born: 13 November 1965 (age 60) Odesa, Soviet Union (now Ukraine)
- Party: All-Ukrainian Union "Fatherland"
- Spouse: Nataliya
- Children: daughter Daria, son Ruslan
- Education: Taras Shevchenko National University of Kyiv
- Awards: Order of Danylo Halytsky; Medal "For Irreproachable Service" III Class

Military service
- Allegiance: Soviet Union; Ukraine
- Branch/service: Soviet Navy; Security Service of Ukraine
- Years of service: 1986–1988 (Black Sea Fleet); 1988–1991 (KGB); 1991–2006 (Security Service)
- Rank: Lieutenant General

Andrii Anatoliiovych Kozhemiakin (Ukrainian: Андрій Анатолійович Кожем'якін; born November 13, 1965, in Odesa, Ukrainian SSR) is a Ukrainian politician and a former security service officer. He has served as a member of the Ukrainian Parliament since 2006.

== Biography ==
=== Military / Security Service career ===
Kozhemiakin graduated in 1986 from the Kyiv Naval Political College and the Taras Shevchenko National University of Kyiv (majoring in "jurisprudence"). From 1986 till 1988 Kozhemiakin served as an officer in a submarine unit in the Black Sea Fleet of the Soviet Navy. From 1988 till March 2006 he served as a senior security officer in a special unit in the KGB, and later starting in 1991 in the SBU. He was promoted to colonel in 2002, and major general in 2005 when he headed the anti-corruption unit.

==== Ranks promotions ====
- 2002 Colonel
- 2005 Major General
- 2016 Lieutenant General

Kozhemiakin is a former member of the National Olympic Committee of Ukraine. He left the National Olympic Committee in January 2023.

=== Parliamentary career ===
In 2006 and 2007 Kozhemiakin was elected into Parliament on a Yulia Tymoshenko Bloc ticket. After the 2007 election Ivan Kyrylenko was elected faction leader of Yulia Tymoshenko Bloc in the Ukrainian Parliament. The faction re-elected Kozhemiakin as its leader on 7 December 2011.

Kozhemiakin was placed at number 11 on the electoral list of Batkivshchina during the 2012 Ukrainian parliamentary election; he was re-elected to parliament.

In the 2014 Ukrainian parliamentary election he was again re-elected to parliament; this time after placing 13th on the electoral list of Batkivshchina.

In the 2019 Ukrainian parliamentary election Kozhemiakin was again re-elected to parliament; this time after placing 7th on the electoral list of Batkivshchina. He was named Youth and Sports Committee Head, and chairperson of the parliamentary committee on law enforcement legislation.

A draft civil union law, introduced following the 2022 Russian invasion of Ukraine, that would give same-sex partnerships legal status in Ukraine was supported by Kozhemiakin in 2023 because "If it will never exist in Russia, it should exist and be supported here."

In 2023, Ukrainian four-time individual world sabre champion Olga Kharlan was disqualified by the Fédération Internationale d'Escrime (FIE) at the World Fencing Championships in Milan, Italy. Kharlan defeated Russian Anna Smirnova 15-7. Smirnova extended her hand to Kharlan, who in turn extended her saber in an offer to the Russian to tap blades. Kharlan said her choice of salute was meant as a sign of respect for her opponent, while still acknowledging the ongoing conflict between Ukraine and Russia. After a long delay during which Smirnova protested and sat on the strip for 45 minutes, Kharlan was ultimately black-carded and eliminated from the championship by FIE officials. The Russian had been allowed to compete as a neutral athlete. The National Fencing Federation of Ukraine filed an appeal. At the behest of the IOC, the FIE's disqualification of Kharlan was cancelled by the FIE, making it possible for her to enter the team event. Kharlan was also told by the IOC that due to the circumstances she was being granted automatic qualification into the 2024 Paris Olympics. Kozhemiakin drafted resolution No. 9554 of Verkhovna Rada, a draft appeal that was registered to the parliaments and governments of democratic countries, the IOC, and international sports federations calling for the condemnation of the disqualification of Kharlan by the FIE. It also asks that all persons involved in the decision to disqualify Kharlan be brought to justice, and calls for the disqualification of the Russian fencer for life for having engaged in a provocative act contrary to the Olympic spirit.
