= Kiev Naval Political College =

Former Soviet naval college

Coordinates: 50.4650°N 30.5192°E

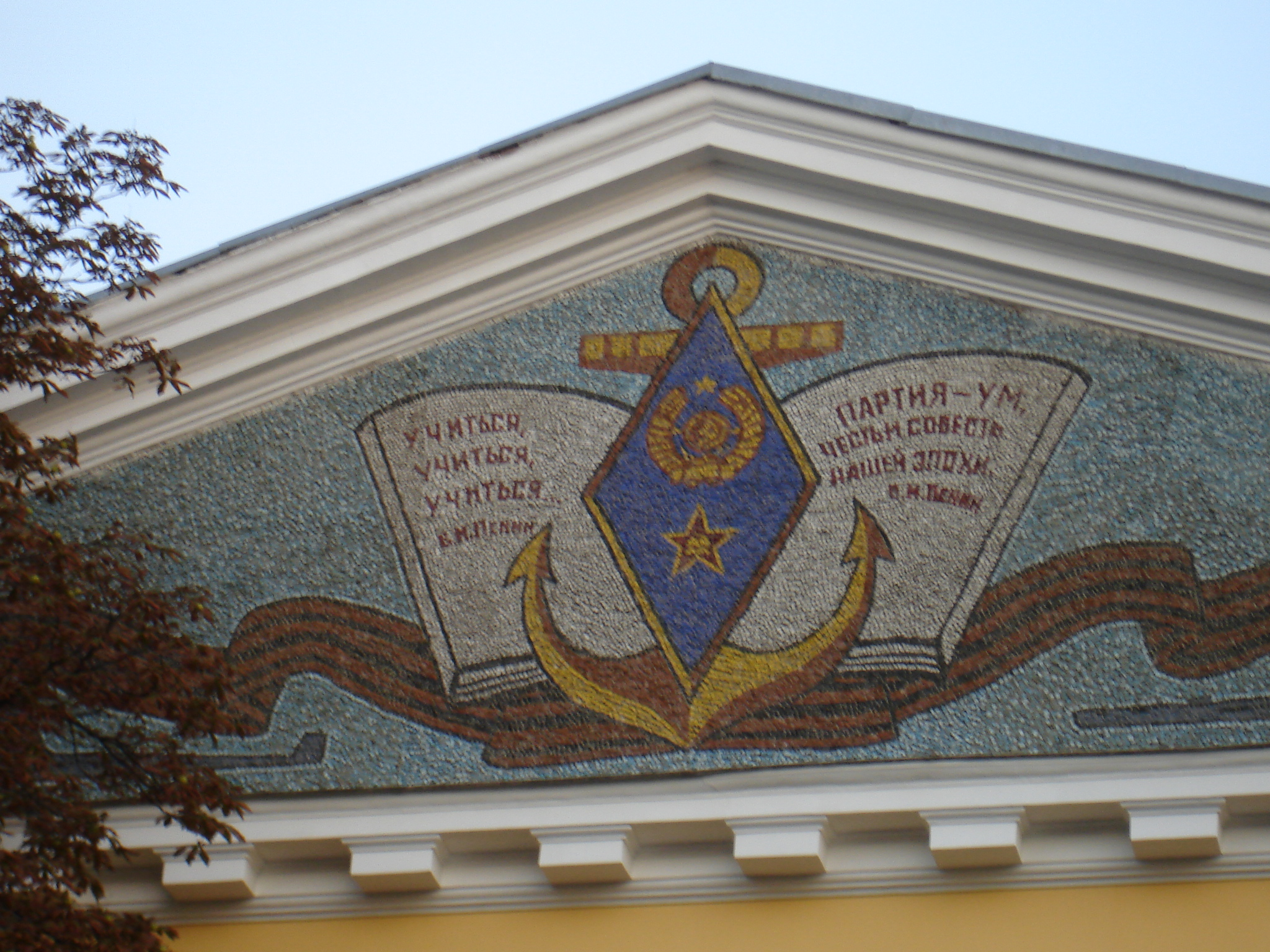
Soviet mosaic on the top of the Kiev Mohyla Academy dedicated to the military college.

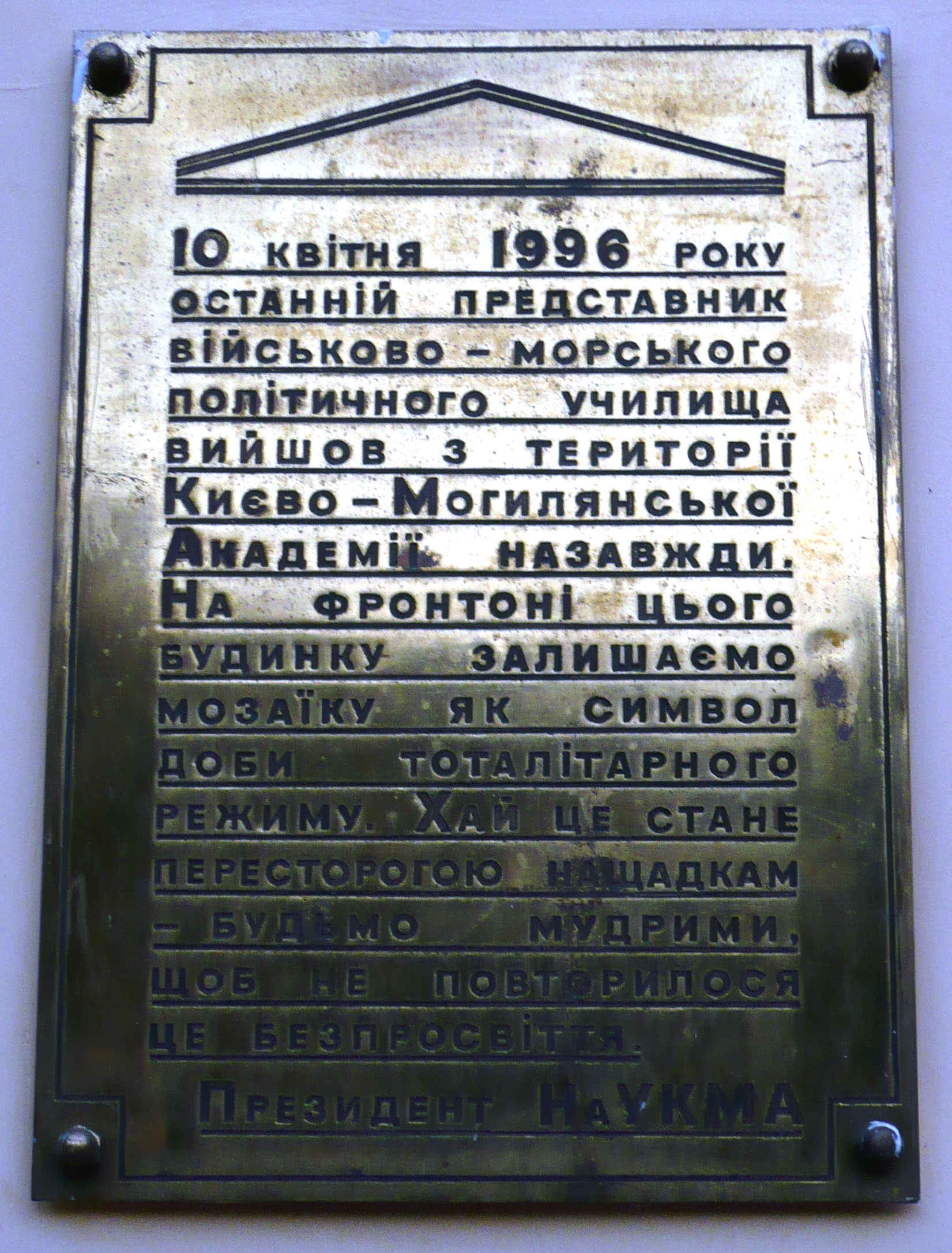
A plaque that is stating about preservation of the Soviet mosaic

The Kiev Naval Political College (Note: Russian: Киевское высшее военно-морское политическое училище, romanized: Kiyevskoye vyssheye voyenno-morskoye politicheskoye uchilishche; Ukrainian: Київське вище військово-морське політичне училище, romanized: Kyivske vyshche viiskovo-morske politychne uchylyshche), abbreviated as KVVMPU (Note: Russian: КВВМПУ; Ukrainian: КВВМПУ), was a state military institution of higher education. It was the only school in the Soviet Union that prepared political commissars for the Soviet Navy.

The college was established on 21 January 1967 by the Central Committee of the CPSU. The institution was located in the building that was formerly a headquarters of the Soviet Dnieper Flotilla, and before that was previously used by the Kiev Theological Academy. From 1948 to 1957, prior to the college's founding, the Kiev Naval Political School existed.

In 1995 the college was closed and dissolved. Its building was transferred to the newly established National University of Kyiv-Mohyla Academy that claims to be a descendant of the old Kyiv Mohyla Academy (1632-1817).

The mosaic with the college's symbol was preserved by the administration of new university. It contains two quotes of the Soviet and communist leader, Vladimir Lenin: "Study, study, study..." and "The Party is the mind, honor and conscience of our era".

== Notable alumni ==
- Andriy Kozhemiakin (born 1965), politician and former security service officer

== See also ==
- Lenin Military-Political Academy
