= Economics Education and Research Consortium =

Ukrainian educational organization

The Economics Education and Research Consortium (EERC) is an organization founded with the purpose of improving economics education and research within the Commonwealth of Independent States.

== History ==
Established in Kyiv in 1995, the organization supports policy-research, training, workshops and research infrastructure as part of the wider Global Development Network's operations in post-Soviet states. The work of the EERC is supported by a panel of international donor organizations that joined forces in 1995 to modernize economics education and research in the CIS. The members of the Consortium are: the Eurasia Foundation, Carnegie Corporation of New York, Government of Finland, Global Development Network, Interpipe Group, Open Society Institute, Government of Sweden, and the World Bank. Support for EERC has also been provided by the Citigroup Foundation, ING Bank Ukraine, Industrial Union of Donbas, Konrad-Adenauer-Stiftung, Kraft Foods Ukraina, the Kytasty Foundation, National Bank of Ukraine, Tetra Pak Ukraine, the Pew Charitable Trusts, Slavutich, Soyuz-Victan, and Swedbank (previously TAS-Kommerzbank). The EERC's mission is also supported by a range of corporate sponsors, such as AcadEx Ltd., Coca-Cola Beverages Ukraine, Eastern Economist, Kraft Foods Ukraina, JSC Obolon, Orfey Publications, Oriflame Ukraine, Robert Bosch Ukraine, Sun Interbrew, System Integration (SI) IBM partner, US Embassy to Ukraine.

The Consortium has two distinct programs - one in Ukraine and the other in Russia. In Ukraine at the National University of Kyiv-Mohyla Academy, the EERC has established the two-year English-language master's program in economics that produces Ukrainian economist trained in modern market economics. The intent is to position these economists as future leaders in Ukraine's economic policy circles through post-MA careers in public service, research institute, or private sector positions, or through completing PhDs abroad and returning to Ukraine to teach. Having achieved initial success in its teaching program, the longer-term aim of the EERC is to create a local centre for academic excellence in economics. By enabling graduates with Western training to return to Ukraine to teach and conduct research, EERC hopes to encourage the development of a dynamic economics community in Ukraine.

In Russia, the mission has been established to encourage the application of modern economics theory to policy analysis and to facilitate the creation of an economic policy community in Russia and elsewhere in the CIS, EERC operates a Moscow-based Economics Research Network which provides individual economists in the region with research funding, advanced training, and professional networking opportunities at home and abroad. Since 2000, EERC-Russia has been serving as the regional representative of the Global Development Network (GDN) in CIS countries. The EERC also holds semi-annual grant competitions and other tenders for research on specific topics, and hosts workshops and produces working papers on relevant economic policy questions in the CIS. Researchers and projects supported reach right across the CIS, and the EERC facilitates networking and resource sharing between researchers and institutions to foster a policy community and network of exchange on economic questions.
