= National University of Kyiv-Mohyla Academy =

Public university in Kyiv, Ukraine

- Національний університет «Києво-Могилянська академія» ДЗВО «НаУКМА»
- Latin: Academia Kiioviensis Mohileana
- Former names: Kiev Brotherhood School (1615–1632); Collegium Kijovense Mohileanum (1632–1658); Academia Kiioviensis Mohileana (1658–1819); Kiev Theological Academy (1819–1918); National University of "Kyiv-Mohyla Academy" (since 1991)
- Motto: Tempus fugit, Academia sempiterna (Latin)
- Motto in English: Time passes but the Academy is eternal
- Type: National, state-sponsored, research
- Established: 1615 as Kijowska szkoła bracka; 1632 as Kolegium Kijowsko-Mohylańskie; 1658 as Akademia Mohylańska w Kijowie; 1819 as Киевская духовная академия; 1991 as Національний університет "Києво-Могилянська Академія"
- Founder: Petro Mohyla
- Affiliations: Ministry of Education and Science of Ukraine
- Academic affiliations: EUA
- President: Serhiy Kvit
- Faculty: 180
- Students: c. 4000
- Location: Kyiv, Ukraine; 50°27′52″N 30°31′11″E
- Campus: Urban, 20 acres (8.1 ha)
- Colors: Blue & White
- Website: Ukma.edu.ua

Immovable Monument of National Significance of Ukraine
- Official name: Комплекс споруд Києво-Могилянської Академії (ансамбль Братського монастиря) (Complex of buildings of the Kyiv-Mohyla Academy (ensemble of the Brotherhood Monastery))
- Type: History
- Reference no.: 260025-Н

The National University of Kyiv-Mohyla Academy (abbr. NaUKMA, Ukrainian: Національний університет «Києво-Могилянська академія», НаУКМА, romanized: Natsionalnyi universytet «Kyievo-Mohylianska akademiia»), colloquially known as Mohylianka (Ukrainian: Могилянка), is a highly ranked national state-sponsored research university located in a historic section of Kyiv, Ukraine. The university teaches bilingually in Ukrainian and English, and is one of Ukraine's few universities with internationally recognized diplomas. NaUKMA takes part in numerous international university collaborations, such as the European University Association. With around 4000 students, NaUKMA is one of the smallest universities in Ukraine.

Organized in its current form in 1991, the university takes its name from the institution cited as its main predecessor, the Kyiv-Mohyla Academy established in 1615 and operating until 1819, and is located on the historical academy's grounds in the ancient Podil neighborhood. Alumni of the Kyiv-Mohyla Academy played a formative role in the intellectual and church life of Ukraine and Russia in the 17th and 18th centuries. Among the most notable alumni were hetman Ivan Mazepa and philosopher Hryhorii Skovoroda. Theophan Prokopovich, one of the rectors of the Kyiv-Mohyla Academy, elaborated upon and implemented Peter the Great's reform of the Russian Orthodox Church. In our time the university is known as pro-Western and has served as headquarters for Orange Revolution activists.

== History ==
=== Foundation of the Kyiv-Mohyla Academy ===
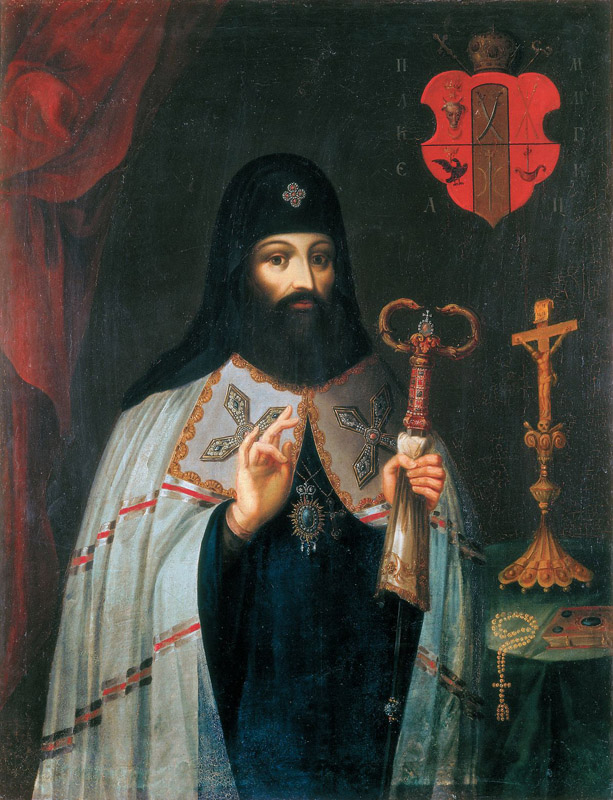
Petro Mohyla, the benefactor of Kyiv Collegium.

Today's National University of Kyiv-Mohyla Academy claims as its predecessor the Kyiv-Mohyla Academy, one of the oldest academic and theological schools amongst the Orthodox Christian countries of Eastern Europe. That Academy was first opened in 1615 as the school of the Kyiv bratstvo ("brotherhood"). When, in 1632, the Kyiv Pechersk Lavra school and Kyiv Brotherhood School merged they formed Kyiv's, and by extension Ukraine's, first institution of higher education. The newly formed 'collegium', then located in the Polish–Lithuanian Commonwealth, was given the Polish name 'Mohylańska' (Latin: Collegium Kijovense Mohileanum), in honour of Petro Mohyla, a key figure in bringing about the institution's foundation and proponent of modern Western educational standards at the academy.

In 1635 the collegium was granted a royal privilege by king Władysław IV. Its structure was based on the model of Western collegiums, with Latin serving as the main language of education, but Greek and Church Slavonic also took an important place in the curriculum. Students of the collegium were divided into three groups specializing respectively in grammar, rhetorics and philosophy (including theological sciences). The collegium was headed by a rector, who also served as the hegumen of Brotherhood Monastery, and a prefect, who was subordinated to the Metropolitan of Kyiv. The collegium also had a branch in Vinnytsia, which was later moved to Hoshcha and functioned there until the late 17th century. Its first professors were transferred from the Lviv Brotherhood School. In 1658, under the terms of the Treaty of Hadiach, the collegium obtained the status of an 'academy', similar to the Kraków Academy – at that time the Polish–Lithuanian Commonwealth's premier university.

From 1686 Kyiv came under Russian rule as a result of the Polish-Russian war. Following a period of decline during the Ruin, the academy prospered under the protection of Ivan Mazepa. The hetman financed construction of the new academic building, and in 1689 a theology class was opened. In 1694 the collegium was also recognised as an academy by the Tsar Ivan V; this was later reaffirmed by his half-brother, co-ruler, and successor, Peter the Great. The same decree also established the rights of the academy as a legal subject. Subsequently, during the 17th and 18th centuries the academy was known for its education of the Russian and Ukrainian political and intellectual elites; it was highly acclaimed throughout Eastern Europe and accepted students of all classes and backgrounds from the territories of modern-day Ukraine, Russia, Poland, Belarus, Romania, Serbia, Bulgaria and Greece. In particular the hetmans – military leaders of the famed Zaporozhian Cossacks – were benefactors of and actively supported the Kyiv-Mohyla Academy. Alumni of the school supported the foundation of a number of other colleges built on its model, such as the Vasilian College in Moldavia and the Slavic Greek Latin Academy in Moscow.

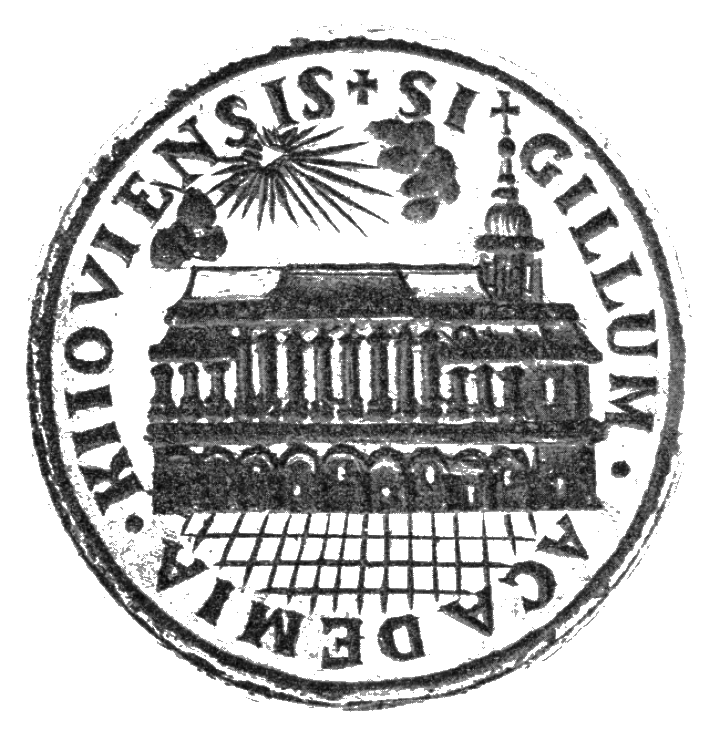
Seal of the old Kyiv-Mohyla Academy.

University rankings

Regional – Overall
- QS Emerging Europe and Central Asia: 131 (2022)

Following a new period of decline after the Battle of Poltava, the academy experienced a resurgence during the tenure of metropolitan Raphael Zaborovsky. Due to the exceptional quality of the language program many of the Kyiv-Mohyla Academy's students continued their education abroad, which at the time meant many of them were required to convert from the Orthodox faith to Roman Catholicism. Despite this, many returning alumni readopted the Orthodox religion, as this was necessary in order to attain positions in the clergy or Academia. By sending so many of its graduates abroad the Kyiv-Mohyla Academy played a vital role in facilitating the transfer of knowledge eastwards across Europe and popularising the Renaissance in Russian Empire. In 1744, 722 of the academy's students represented secular classes, while 380 belonged to the clergy, but the number of the latter grew with time. The full course of education comprised 12 years and consisted of 8 classes, including subjects such as liberal arts, mathematics, as well as French, German, Russian, Polish, Hebrew languages and drawing. Many publications issued by the academy's staff also included elements of Ukrainian vernacular.

=== Closure and reopening as the Kyiv Theological Academy ===
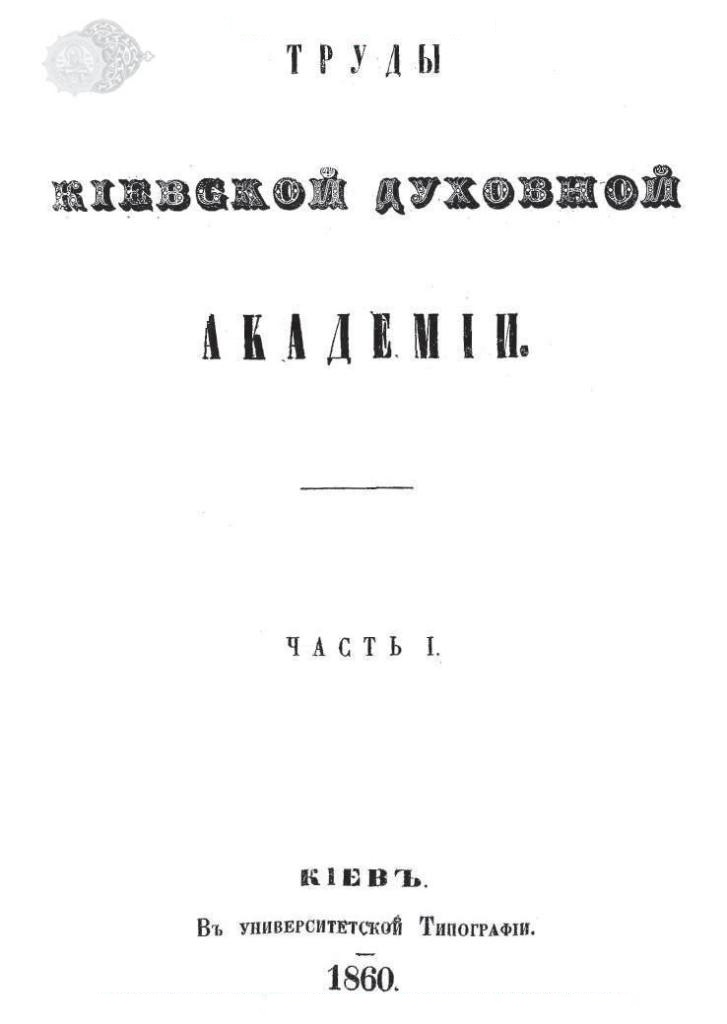
A journal of Kyiv Theological Academy from 1860

During the 1760s, several proposals were issued to transform the academy into a full-fledged university by prominent officials, including hetman Kyrylo Rozumovskyi and Pyotr Rumyantsev. However, those projects were declined by the Russian government. In 1786 properties of the Brotherhood Monastery were secularized, and from that moment on the academy became dependent on government financing. With time, the educational process was increasingly Russified and lost its secular character.

In 1817 Tsar Alexander I of Russia made a decision to close the academy. In response to this move a large number of the academy's alumni petitioned the monarch, albeit unsuccessfully, to turn the Kyiv-Mohyla Academy into a formal university. Instead, in 1819, the academy was turned over to the church and transformed into the Kiev Theological Academy - a purely clerical institution. During this time, admission to the Academy was open only to children of the existing clergy and key positions were held mostly by alumni of the Saint Petersburg Seminary.

With the passing years the need for a new, modern, institution of the higher education in Kyiv became apparent and the Tsar's ministers began to consider the establishment of such a school. It would, however, take a long time before the actual opening of a university in the city and when it finally did occur it did not come in the form of a reopened Kyiv-Mohyla Academy but in the foundation of an entirely new secular university - the Saint Vladimir University, founded in 1834 on the orders of the Tsar Nicholas I.

=== During the Soviet era ===
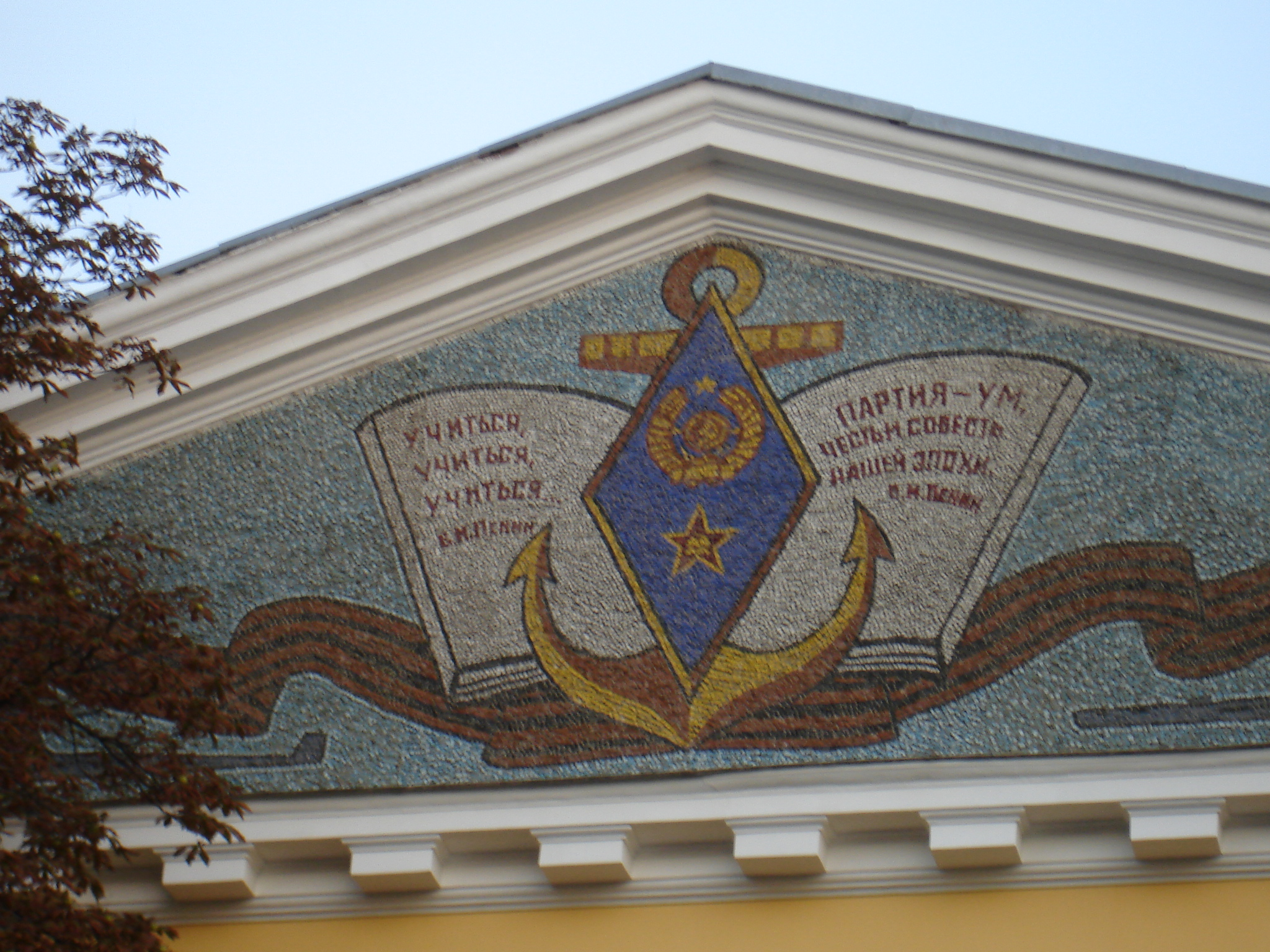
Mosaic portraying Soviet symbols and quotes by Vladimir Lenin: "Study, study, study..." and "The Party is the mind, honour and conscience of our age". This mosaic replaced the image of an open Bible previously presented at the Kyiv Theological Academy wall.

With the success of the October Revolution of 1917 and subsequent establishment of the Soviet Union, atheism became the only state sanctioned belief system and the church (along with its associated organs) were repressed. Shortly thereafter the authorities of the newly proclaimed Ukrainian Soviet Socialist Republic ordered the closure of the Kyiv Theological Academy; its library was later plundered and the main church of the school, the Bogoyavlenskiy Cathedral, was demolished with explosives in 1935.

The premises of the disbanded theological college were later used for a new Soviet military education facility - the Kyiv Higher Naval Political School (Russian: Киевское Высшее Военно-Морское Политическое Училище) - the only naval academy that trained specialist political commissars for the Soviet Navy. To this day one of the university's buildings still bears a mosaic portraying a warship, academic badge and open book displaying quotes by Vladimir Lenin; upon the reestablishment of NaUKMA in 1992 a conscious decision was made to retain this mosaic as a visible reminder of the site's prior usage and totalitarian past.

=== Since Ukrainian independence ===
Following Perestroika and the fall of the USSR in 1991, the Kyiv-Mohyla Academy was reestablished. This was made possible through the efforts of Vyacheslav Bryukhovetsky, a high-profile Ukrainian academic, who later became the first president of the 'National University of Kyiv-Mohyla Academy' (NaUKMA). The reestablished institution became the first Ukrainian educational institution to be modelled on and structured according to the basic concepts of the North American higher educational system, with Bachelor's and Master's degrees offered according to the requirements of an academic credit system.

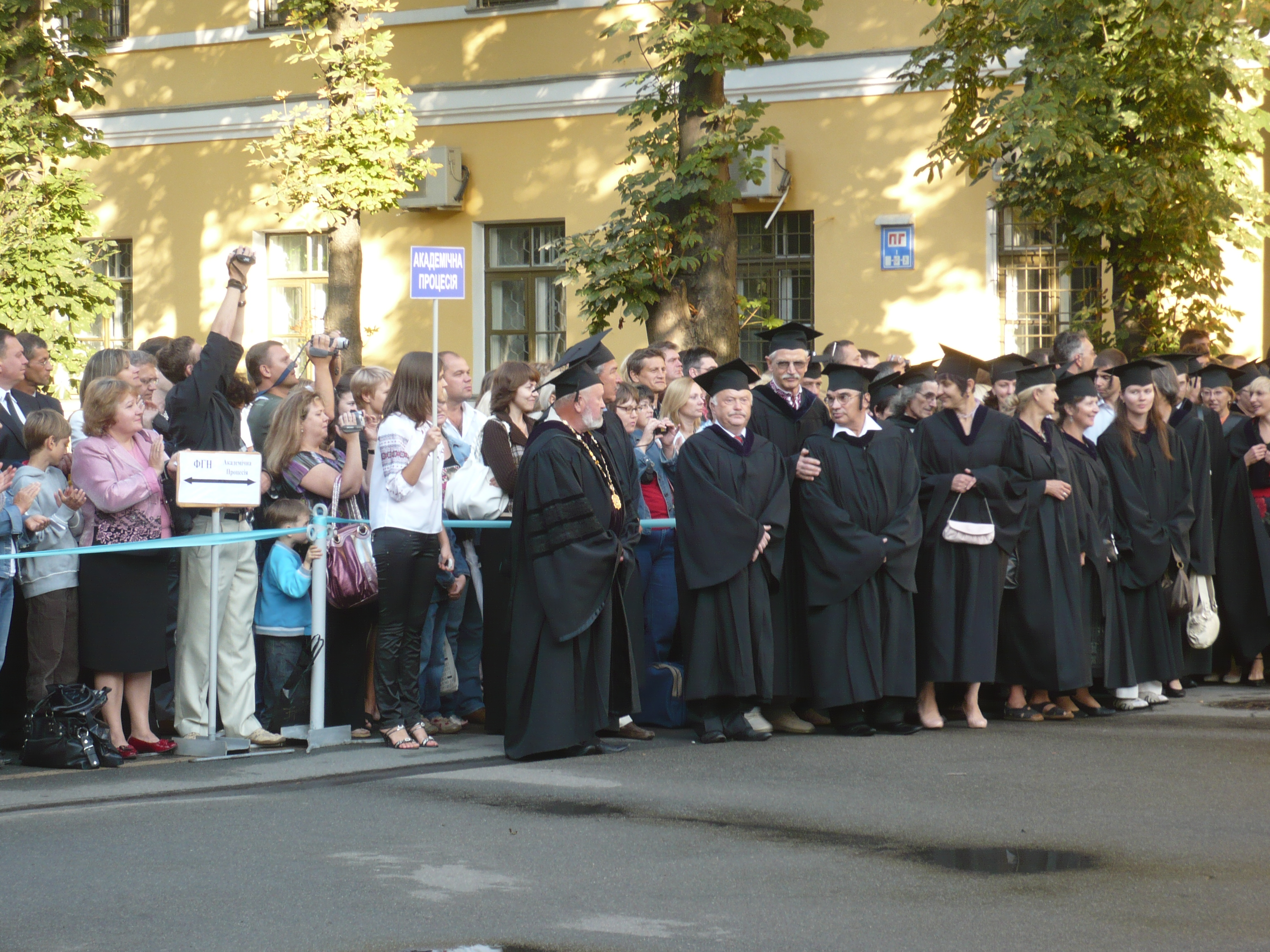
Student initiation ceremony at NaUKMA

On 24 August 1992, the first anniversary of Ukraine's independence, the first cohort of students matriculated at NaUKMA, and by June 1995 the first six graduates of the reborn Kyiv-Mohyla Academy had received their degrees. Since then, NaUKMA's reputation for academic excellence has become well known throughout Ukraine; the university is now consistently ranked as one of the country's top educational institutions.

In 1994 NaUKMA was a key lobbyist for and partner in the revival of another historically noteworthy Ukrainian educational institution, the Ostroh Academy. Today the Ostroh Academy maintains strong links to NaUKMA and, in the year 2000, joined it as one of Ukraine's 19 'national' research universities.

The NaUKMA widely got to be known for being the first university of which students and professors (among the other parties of the Orange Revolution in Kyiv) openly protested against the massive electoral selection fraud during the Ukrainian presidential election in 2004. After those events a museum dedicated to the Orange Revolution was opened at the NaUKMA.

=== Claims of continuity with the old Kyiv-Mohyla Academy ===
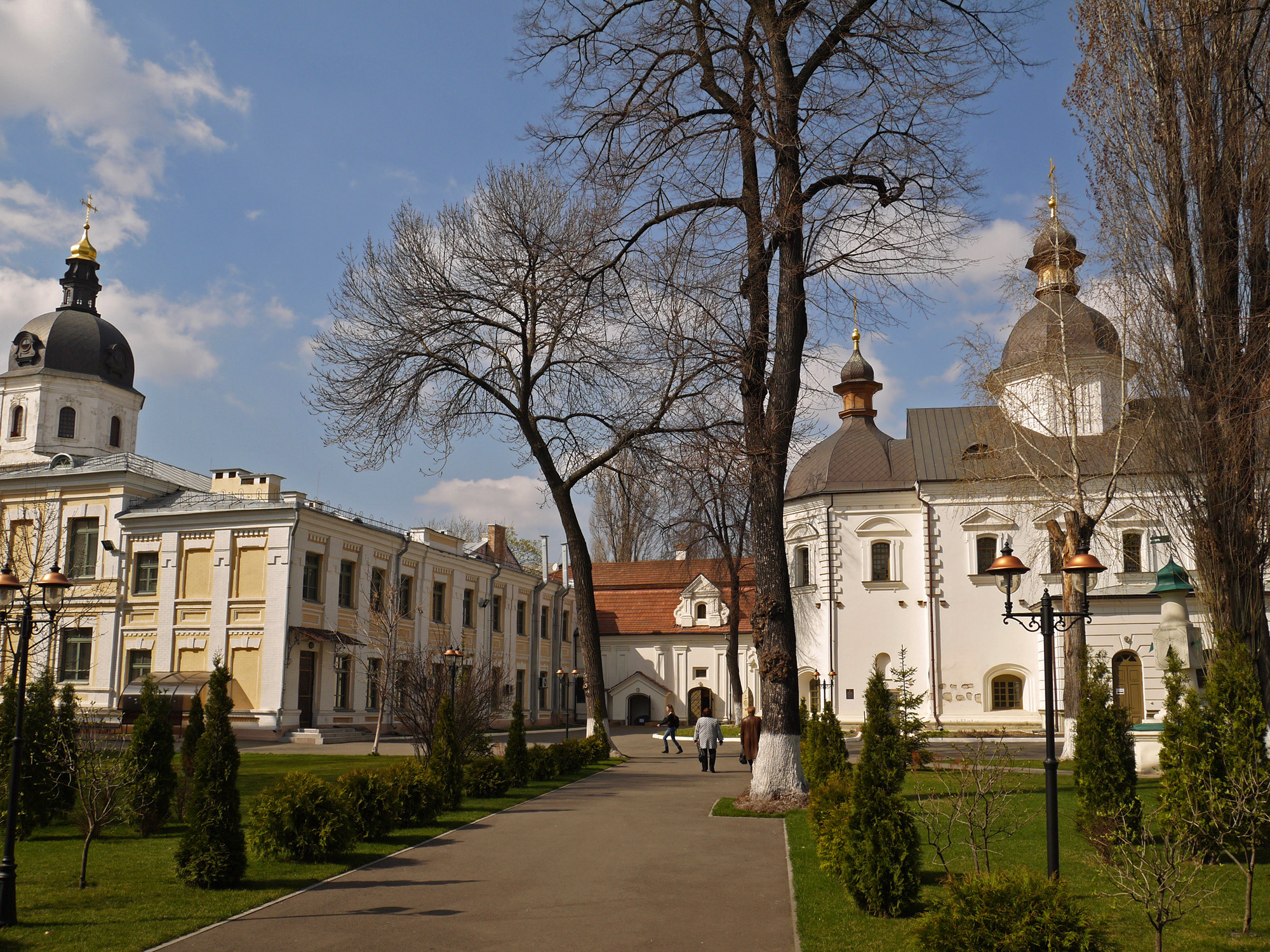
Complex of the Brotherhood Monastery which housed the original academy, now part of NaUKMA's campus

Because of its location on the site of the ancient Mohyla Academy, NaUKMA claims to be the oldest institution of higher education in Kyiv and all of Ukraine. However, this is disputed because NaUKMA has formally existed as a modern university (with a different focus and structure) only since 1991, without any clear continuity during a long break of 174 years in its history.

The modern National University of Ostroh Academy has a similar history of revival, taking its name from Ostroh Academy (dating to 1576), which is considered to be the first institution of higher education in the territory of present-day Ukraine.

Another claimant to the title of the oldest institution of higher education in Ukraine is Lviv University, founded in 1661, which holds the undisputed record for being the oldest continuously operating university in Ukraine. Taras Shevchenko National University of Kyiv (established in 1834) is the oldest continuously operating higher educational institution in the nation's capital, Kyiv.

Besides NaUKMA, two modern theological schools claim continuity with the academic traditions of the old Kyiv-Mohyla Academy. These are the Kyiv Theological Academy and Seminary of the Ukrainian Orthodox Church (Moscow Patriarchate) and the Kyiv Orthodox Theological Academy of the Orthodox Church of Ukraine.

The Research Center "Legacy of Kyiv-Mohyla Academy" was founded in 1992 to research the history of the Mohyla Academy and promote NaUKMA's claim to continuity with the traditions of the old Mohyla Academy.

== Academics ==
Faculties of NaUKMA

- Faculty of Computer Sciences
- Faculty of Economics
- Faculty of Humanities
- Faculty of Law
- Faculty of Natural Sciences
- Faculty of Social Sciences and Social Technologies
- University Department of English Language
- University Department of Physical Training
- Kyiv Mohyla Business School

=== Profile ===
NaUKMA holds the highest accreditation level given by the Ministry of Education and Science of Ukraine and is organized similarly to North American post-secondary institutions. The academic year runs on a trimester system with the longer fall and spring trimesters and a short summer trimester. Fall and spring terms include an extra week of independent study which is aimed to assist students needing to catch up with their coursework and prepare for exams. During undergraduate study students have an academic major and can choose either a minor or electives. Each course is assigned a number of credits based on credit hours and grading is done on a 100-point scale.

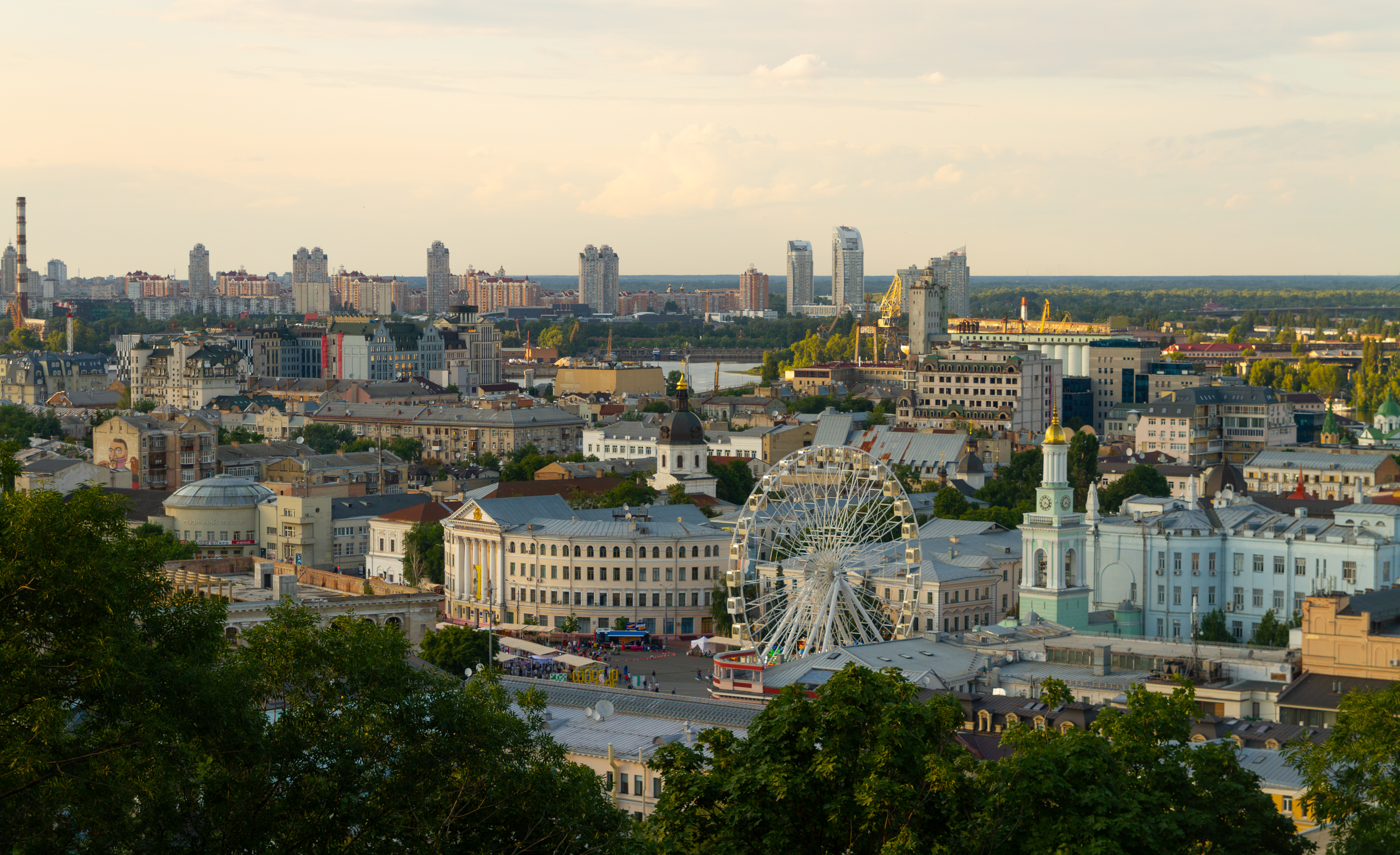
General view NaUKMA's campus

NaUKMA Bachelor's degree holders can continue their studies in any of the Masters programs at the university. Graduate academic programs leading to a Master of Business Administration, Candidate of Science (PhD) and Doctor of Science are also offered at NaUKMA. The university was first in Ukraine to join the reforms of the doctoral education within the Bologna process.

NaUKMA is a bilingual institution with Ukrainian and English being the languages of instruction, although the primary language is Ukrainian. The university offers business courses in English to the general public, in partnership with Grant MacEwan College of Edmonton, Alberta, Canada. NaUKMA organizes an annual summer school in Ukrainian studies for international students and an English-language term program for international students entitled "Transitional studies: Ukraine and post-soviet space". Recently a Master program "German and European studies" is offered in collaboration with the University of Jena. The program is offered in German.

Similarly to other public universities in Ukraine, students receive modest monthly scholarship payments from the government. The amount varies according to the student's grades in the previous trimester. Additionally, a number of private scholarships are given to the best students on a merit system. Further, students are rewarded scholarship money for their social activities, thus awards are given to those who make the greatest contribution to the revival of NaUKMA or to those who excel in the promotion of Ukrainian language and culture.

NaUKMA is a state university and governed by the Supervising Board appointed by the Government of Ukraine. The highest university official is the President of NaUKMA, who is Prof. Serhiy M. Kvit. Education and research at the university are coordinated by the Scientific Board. Several public bodies consult the management of the university. These include the International Consulting Board, Board of Trustees, Student Council and Arts Board.

=== Admissions ===
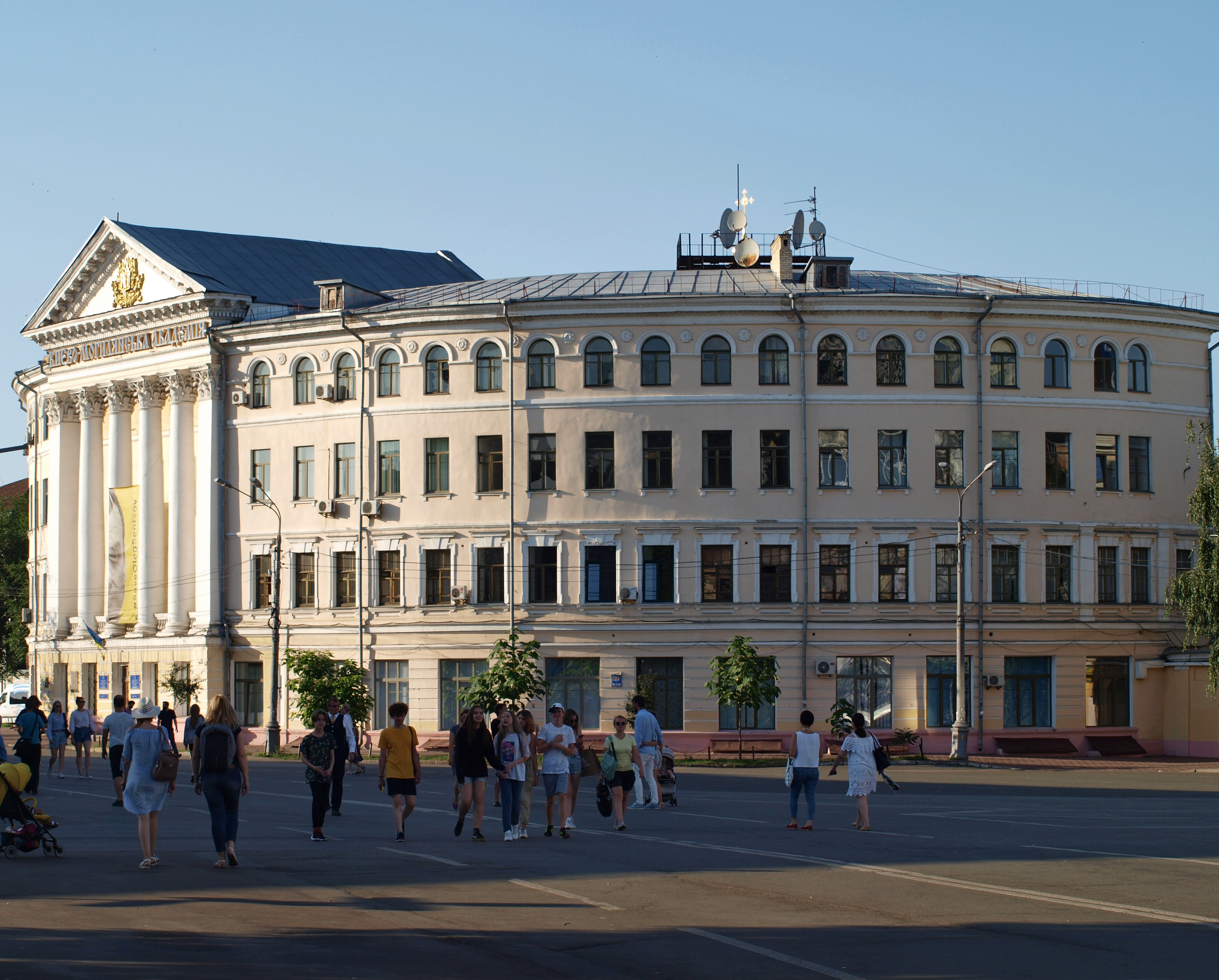
Main building of the university as seen from Kontraktova Square

Admission to NaUKMA is open to both Ukrainian and international applicants. Admission is granted based on entrance examination scores. Entrance exams are administered as multiple choice tests covering several subjects including Ukrainian, English, law, mathematics, history of the Kyiv-Mohyla Academy, humanities (literature or history) and natural science, with the tests being machine scored. The admissions procedure was introduced in order to stem alleged corruption in the admission process. Admission tests are considered challenging and cover a broader range of subjects than the typical entrance examinations held at the majority of other universities in Ukraine. Testing the knowledge of history of the Kyiv-Mohyla Academy is exceptional among Ukrainian universities. It was introduced because of the role of the university in Ukrainian history. The university also has a Department of Preuniversity Training, which organizes test preparation courses for prospective students as well as trial testing sessions.

=== Reputation ===
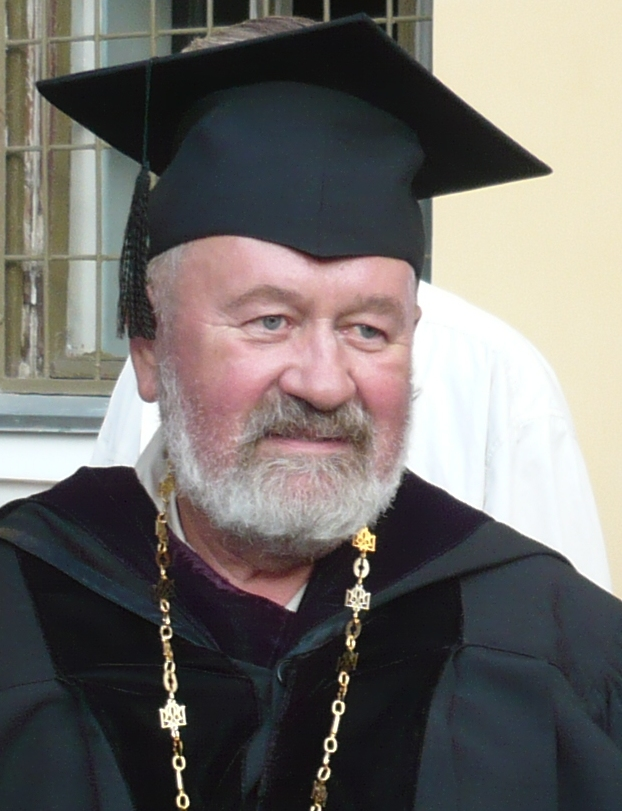
Vyacheslav Briukhovetskyi, who initiated the revival of the Kyiv-Mohyla Academy was awarded the title Hero of Ukraine for this.

In 2009 Delovoy magazine ranked NaUKMA as the second best university in Ukraine, being nationally the strongest in humanities, third best in economics and second best in law. According to the independent ranking of 228 universities in Ukraine performed by Compas, NaUKMA was ranked second best in Ukraine regarding the adequacy of alumni to the labor market of Ukraine. In 2007, both the Ministry of Education and Science of Ukraine and the Dzerkalo Tyzhnia, a weekly national newspaper ranked NaUKMA in third place among the Ukrainian universities. Likewise, the university's business school has the best reputation in the country. The Delovoy magazine ranked the Kyiv Mohyla Business School as the best business school in Ukraine in 2007. NaUKMA was ranked as number four in the ranking "Top-200 Ukraine" conducted by UNESCO in 2007.

In the international Webometrics Ranking of World Universities the university features at 2,055 out of 8,000 ranked institutions and second best among Ukrainian universities.

NaUKMA often hosts visits of foreign and national politicians. Among the latest visitors were Jaap de Hoop Scheffer, Alejandro Toledo, David Kilgour and Jean Chrétien.

NaUKMA in the rankings of universities in Ukraine:

Ranking	2007	2008	2009	2010	2011	2012	2013
Compas	2	2	2	4	4	3	4
Zerkalo Nedeli/UNESCO	3	9	8	–	5	4	4
Dengi	2	2	2	–	–	–	–
Korespondent.net	2	3	–	2	–	2	2
Kommentarii:	–	–	–	2	–	–	–
Kyiv student council	–	–	3	–	–	–	–
Webometrics	–	–	9	2	7	30	–
4 International Colleges & Universities	–	–	–	9	16	7	92

=== Institutions associated with NaUKMA ===
Following its reestablishment, NaUKMA has been active in the revival and founding of institutions sharing a common vision of educational standards. Thus, NaUKMA assisted with the development of the National University of Ostroh Academy, the Taras Shevchenko Pedagogical University of Kremenets, and the Petro Mohyla State University of Mykolayiv until they became separate independent universities. However, these schools still share a common admissions system with NaUKMA. Moreover, NaUKMA is an umbrella institution for a network of high schools throughout Ukraine called the collegiums. The curricula of collegiums aim to prepare the students for the NaUKMA entrance exams.

The university publishing house "Kyiv-Mohyla Academy", which specializes in publishing scientific and educational literature in Ukraine, is situated on the NaUKMA campus.

==== Foreign Partner Universities ====
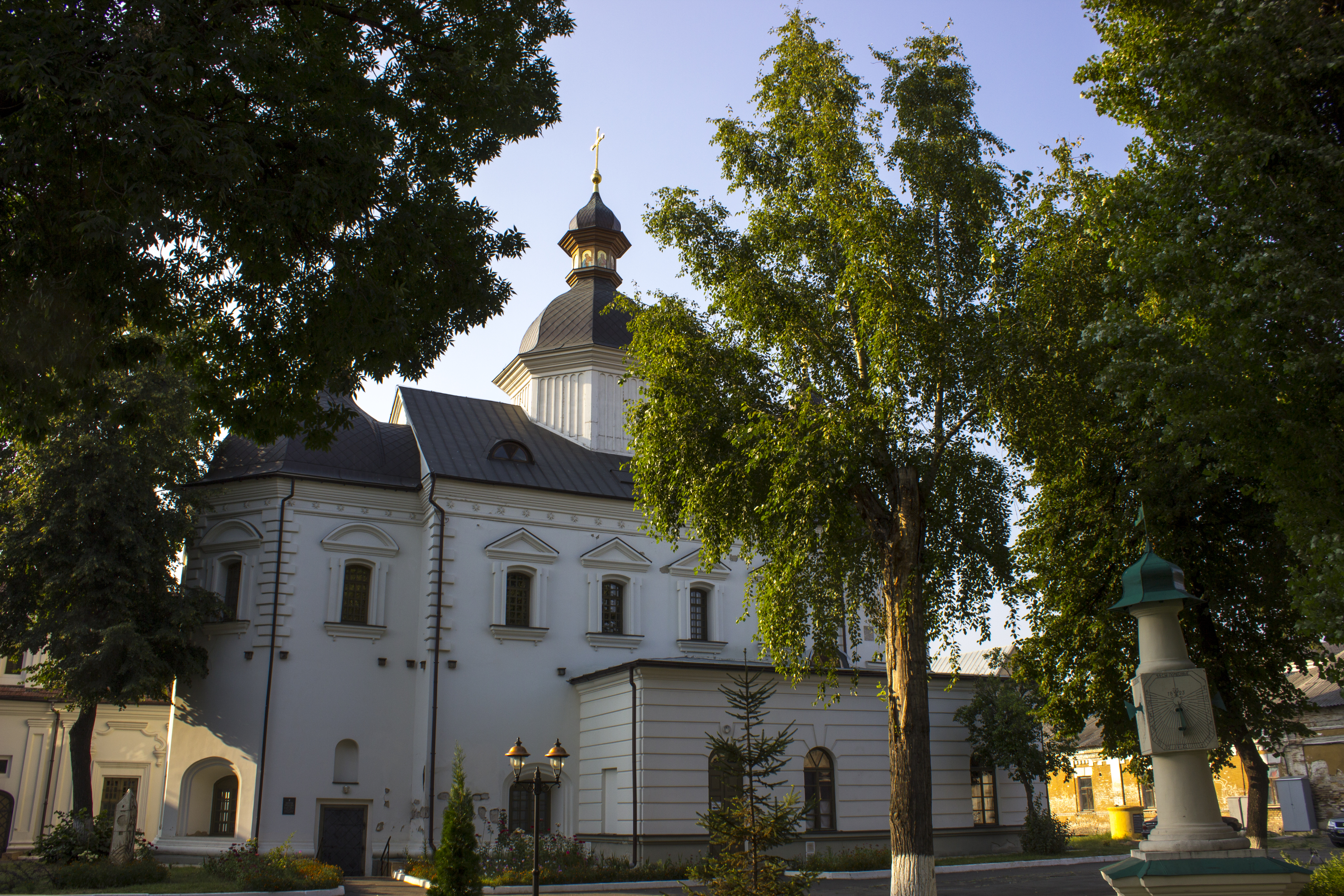
The University Church of the Holy Spirit

The university maintains relations with a number of partner universities both through formal bilateral agreements and schemes like Erasmus Mundus. Current bilateral agreements are outlined below.

Country	University	Country	University
Canada	University of Toronto	Finland	University of Helsinki
Canada	University of Manitoba	Germany	Stralsund University
Canada	University of Western Ontario	Lithuania	ISM University of Management and Economics
France	Sciences Po	Norway	BI Norwegian Business School
France	École Normale Supérieure	Poland	University of Warsaw

== Research ==
Science at NaUKMA is organized into six faculties, 29 departments and 24 research centers. An annual scientific conference Dni Nauky NaUKMA (The Days of Science at NaUKMA) takes place in the last week of January. The main focus of research at the NaUKMA is in the fields of economics, law and humanities. Many faculty members hold permanent positions at the research institutes of the National Academy of Science of Ukraine and NaUKMA students are allowed to use its facilities for scientific and educational purposes.

== Libraries ==
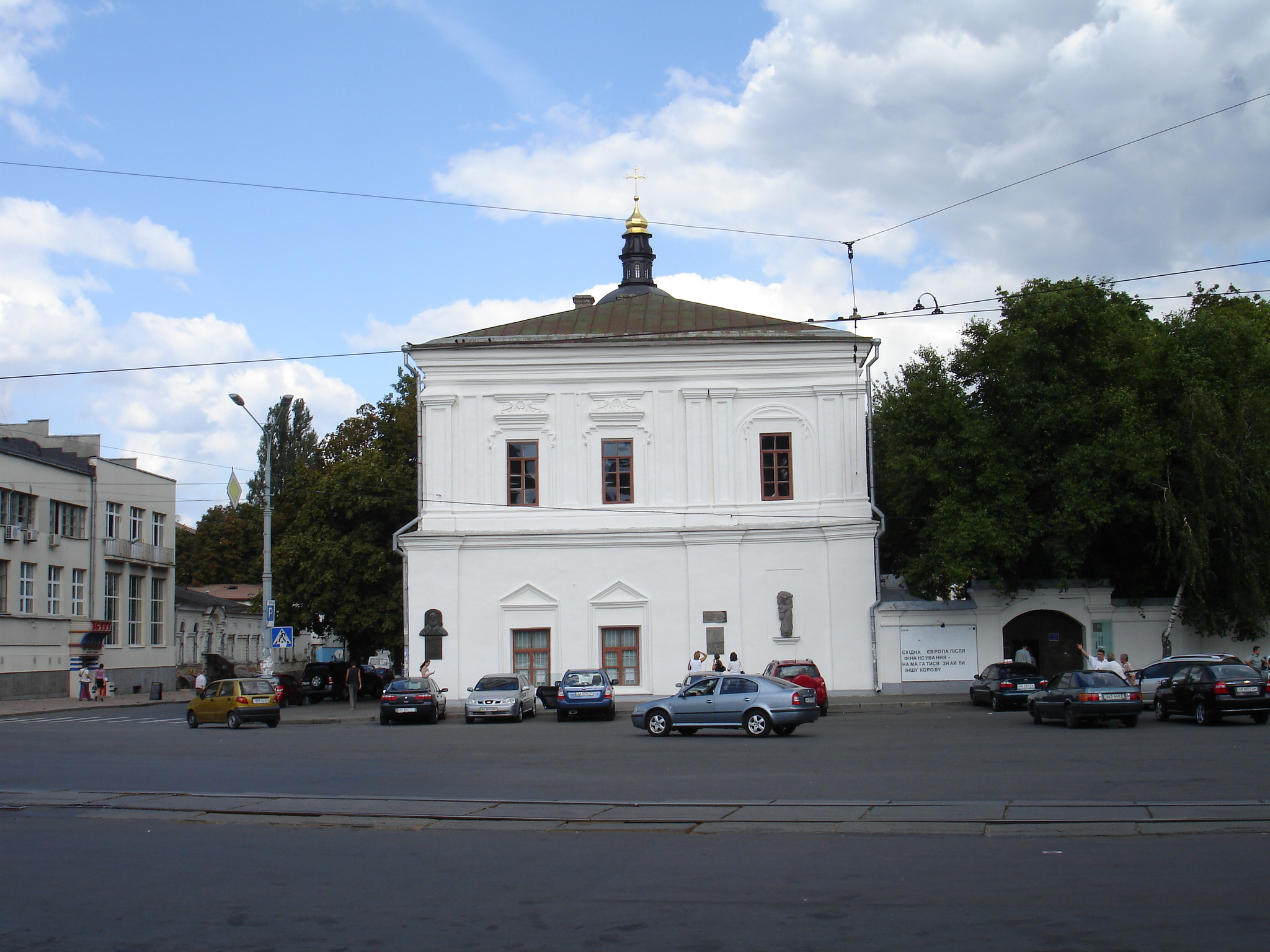
The Mazepa building houses the NaUKMA research library.

The library of the old Kyiv Mohyla Academy contained a notable collection of the books. However, the archive was plundered in 1920s when the academy was closed. The university administration focuses on creating a research library equipped to modern standards. In addition to the central undergraduate library there is a number of the departmental libraries as well as reading halls for research and periodicals. Further, several international cultural organizations such as the Goethe-Institute, British Council and, American Library are located on campus premises and are open to the public. Also all the NaUKMA students have an access to the Vernadsky National Library of Ukraine.

== Campus ==
The university occupies the grounds of the Kyiv-Mohyla Academy in the Podil neighborhood, from Kontraktova Square to the Dnipro River. The campus of NaUKMA is composed of a number of buildings constructed in the times of its predecessor institutions. The oldest buildings date from the 17th century, and include the Halshka Hulevychivna house and the old academic building also called the Mazepa building in honor of its financier Hetman Ivan Mazepa. The Mazepa building contains the congregation hall for ceremonial events, the Center for Contemporary Art and the research library.

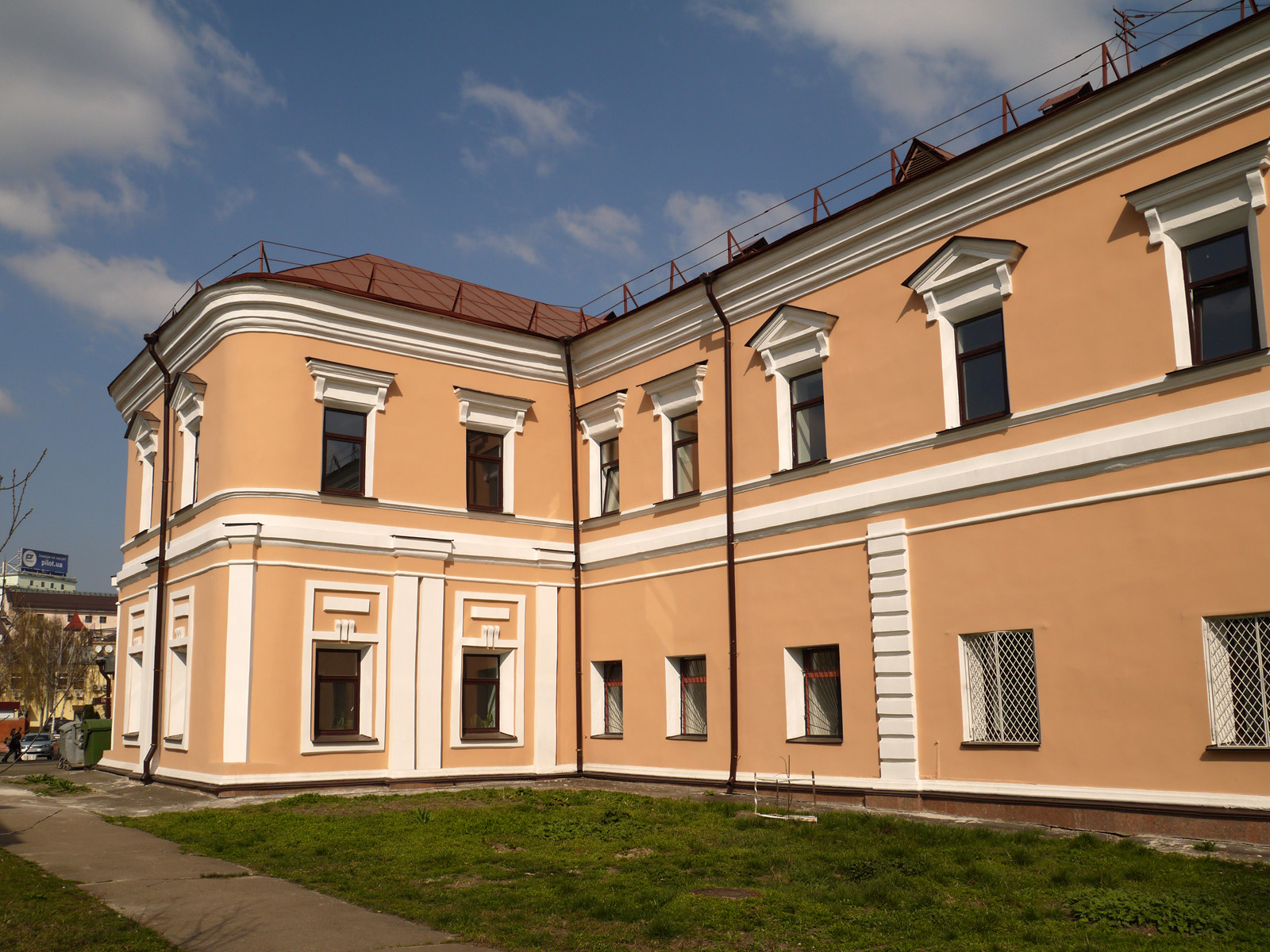
Bursa building of NaUKMA

In the same neighborhood is the historical museum complex of the Kyiv-Mohyla Academy, although the building is undergoing renovation. The complex contains a sundial and the house of Halshka Hulevychivna, which was the first building of the Kyiv Brotherhood School. Another historical building called the bursa faces the Dnipro River and was used as a student dormitory during the time of the Kyiv-Mohyla Academy. The Blahovishchenska (Annunciation) Church built in 1740 for students is also on the NaUKMA campus. Most other buildings were constructed during the time of Kyiv Theological Academy with some additions made during the Soviet era. The dormitories are situated outside the main campus. The largest one is situated in Troyeshchyna (14B Marina Tsvetaeva Street). The second largest is located at the Kharkiv highway, 17. Another one dormitory, a few years ago, transferred to the property of the academy, is located at 31A John McCain Street. The last, and the most remote is located at urban village Vorzel, 6A Klenova Street (masters and postgraduate students are mostly settled here).

An environmentally-friendly office called the Green Office was recently opened at the Department of Environmental Studies at NaUKMA and uses modern energy-saving and environmentally friendly technologies. The project was largely the initiative of students and is the first example of an office-based on sustainable development in a Ukrainian educational institution.

== University traditions ==
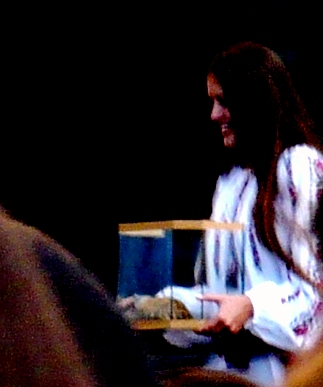
The university turtle named Alma is passed around the new students and graduates who make wishes while touching her shell.

Following reestablishment, the NaUKMA academic community has attempted to restore the traditions of its predecessor. However, during NaUKMA's reincarnation, several new traditions have been founded. Every year on 15 October the school celebrates Academy day and NaUKMA students wash the monument of the noted Kyiv-Mohyla alumnus philosopher Hryhorii Skovoroda. This action is called clean Skovoroda. The monument of Skovoroda in front of the university is also decorated with a mortarboard during the annual graduation ceremony held on 28 June. Another tradition during the ceremony is to carry the university turtle named Alma around the new graduates who make wishes while touching her shell. A student tradition connecting the old Kyiv-Mohyla Academy and NaUKMA is theatrical performances called verteps. Verteps possibly were introduced by the students of the old Academy. They are performed during different festive events. Lastly, it is a tradition to open each academic year with a welcome event for the new students, followed by a lecture by a renowned scientist, who is given an honorary professorship at the university. The ceremony of new NaUKMA student initiation includes taking a traditional student oath. During the first term at NaUKMA, students of all faculties introduce themselves to the academic community during the acquaintance ball.

== Student life ==
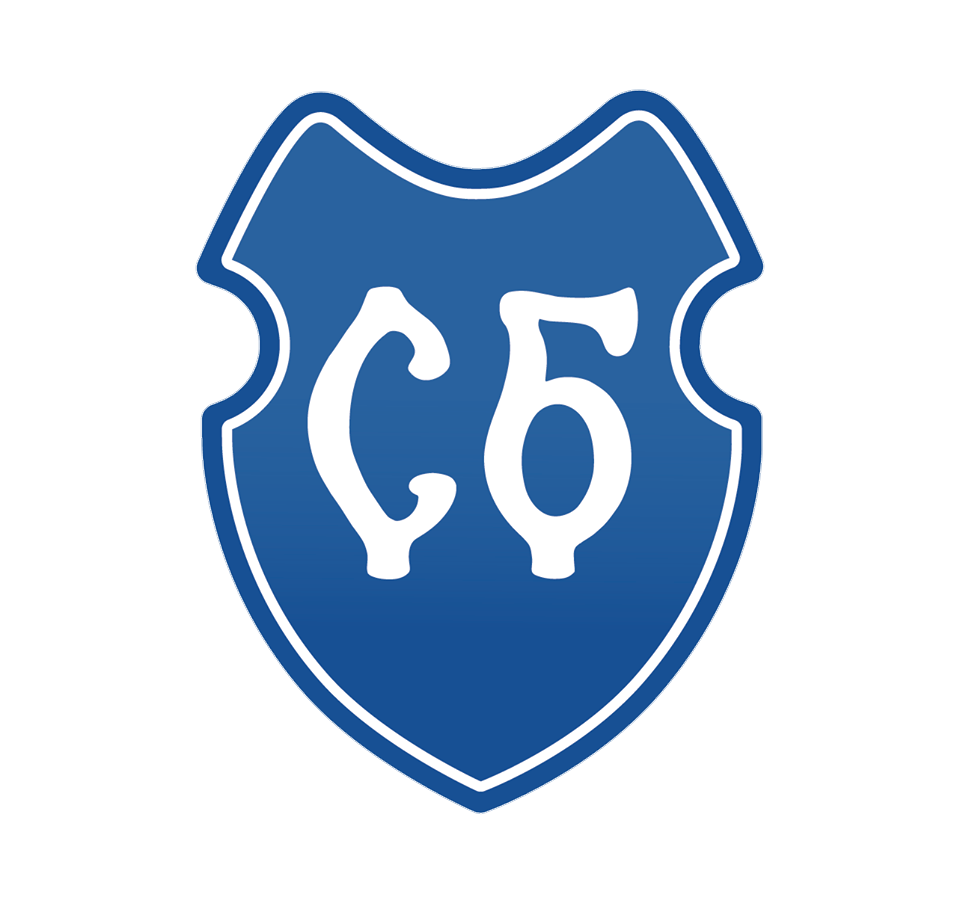
Logo of NaUKMA Student Brotherhood

Despite the relatively small number of NaUKMA students (about 3000 in 2006) there are a number of extracurricular activities on campus. NaUKMA students are also known for their activism, which is also supported by the university administration. Notable among the student organizations on campus are: the Student Council, the Christian Students Union, Mohyla Intellectual Club, the Student Brotherhood, the ecological club Zelena Hvylya, and the Youth Center for Humanities. The NaUKMA student portal Bo.Net.Ua is an online platform for student and alumni communication.

Sports courses are compulsory for NaUKMA students in their two years of study. These courses include elements of calisthenics, sport (soccer, basketball, volleyball and swimming) and fitness exercises. Additionally, there are a number of student sport groups ranging from Combat Hopak to Go.

Arts and music at NaUKMA are represented by the Center of Culture and Art and the Center for Contemporary Art.

== Kyiv-Mohyla Academy in literature and popular culture ==
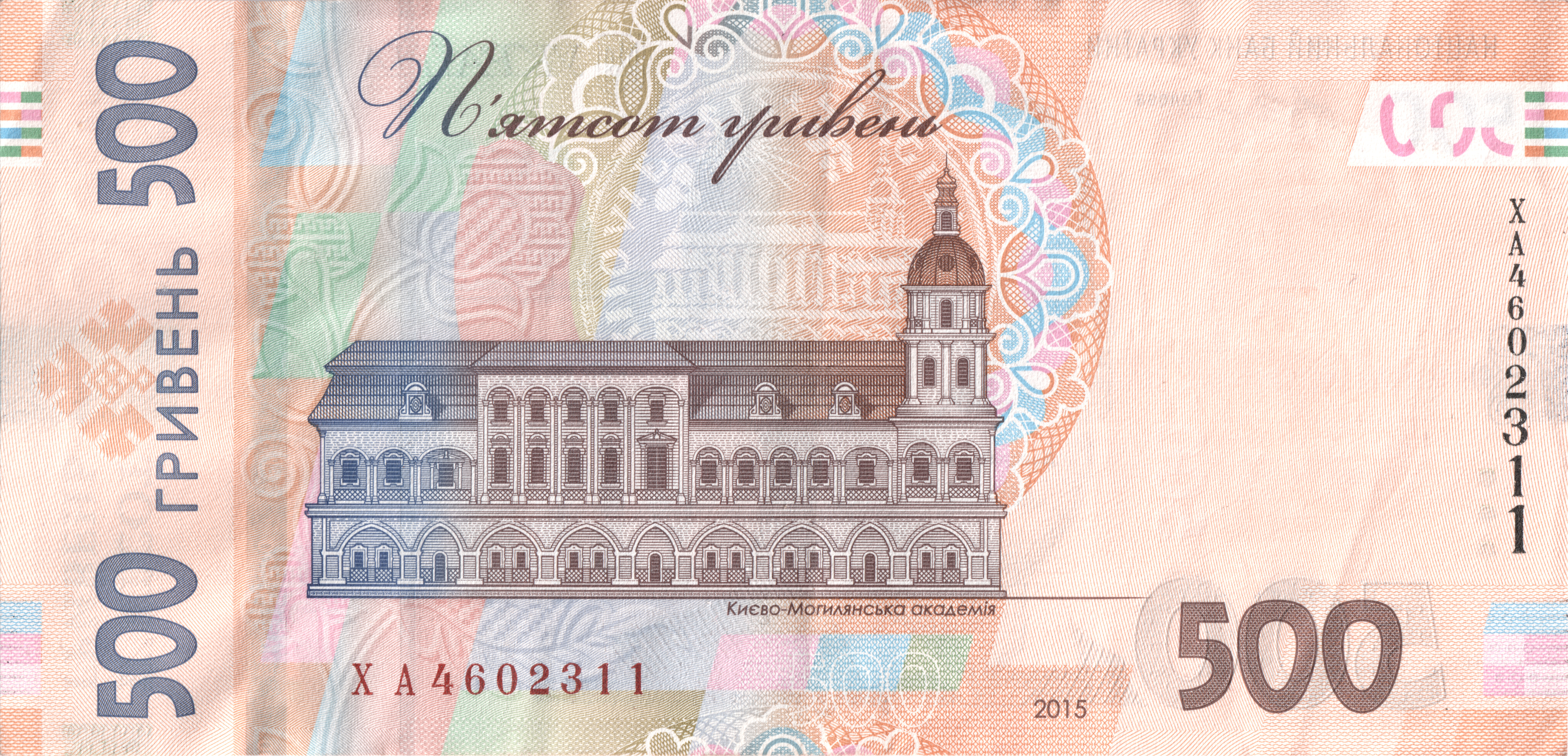
Mazepa building of Kyiv-Mohyla Academy on the 500 hryven' banknote.

Kyiv-Mohyla Academy is mentioned in a number of novels. The main characters of Nikolai Gogol's novel Taras Bulba Ostap and Andriy Bulba were alumni of the old Kyiv-Mohyla Academy. Kyiv-Mohyla Collegium is mentioned in several novels by Pavlo Zahrebelnyi including Southern Comfort and I, Bohdan. Kyiv Theological Academy is mentioned in Nikolai Leskov's Pecherskie antiki. Student life in the contemporary Kyiv-Mohyla Academy is described in a novel High school student. Freshman (Старшокласниця. Першокурсниця) by Anastasiya Levkova. Protagonist of the "Myth and Madness" novel by Daniel Hryhorczuk is a PhD student of Kyiv-Mohyla Academy during Euromaidan.

To note the importance of the university in Ukraine's history, a postage stamp dedicated to Kyiv-Mohyla Academy and its revival was issued in 1992. Moreover, a building of Kyiv-Mohyla Academy is portrayed on the 500 hryven' banknote.

== Notable alumni and faculty members ==
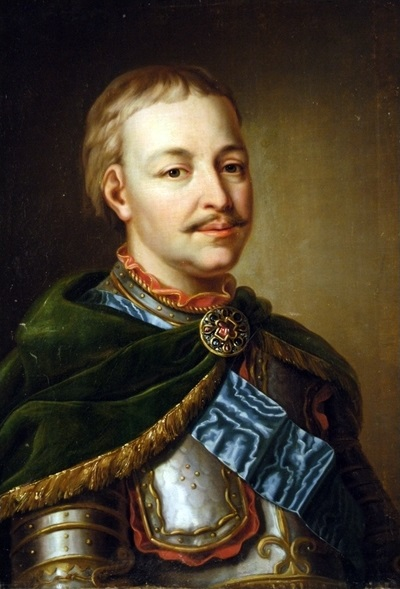
Ivan Mazepa – hetman of Ukraine

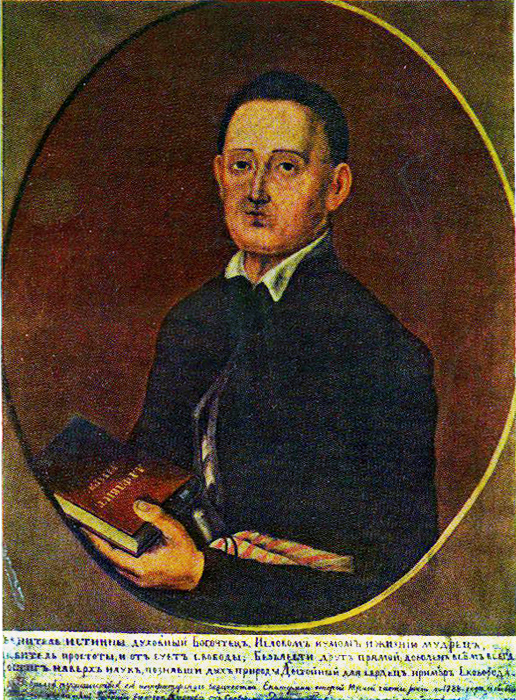
Hryhorii Skovoroda – Ukrainian philosopher

Alumni of the old Kyiv-Mohyla Academy have played an important role in Ukrainian professional life. Many hetmans of Zaporozhian Cossacks, political leaders of Ukraine in the 17th and 18th centuries, were educated here. These include Ivan Mazepa, Pylyp Orlyk, Pavlo Polubotok, Ivan Skoropadsky and Ivan Samoylovych. The Grand Chancellor of Russia Alexander Bezborodko was of Ukrainian origin and an alumnus. The Kyiv-Mohyla Academy was a religious school of note in the Orthodox world and archbishops of the Russian Empire such as Stephen Yavorsky and Feofan Prokopovich as well as the metropolitan bishop of Rostov Dimitry of Rostov were all alumni.

More recently, several generations of writers, artists and scholars have been schooled at the Kyiv Mohyla Academy. Examples include writer Simeon of Polotsk, architect Ivan Hryhorovych-Barskyi, and composer Artemy Vedel. Ukrainian philosopher Hryhorii Skovoroda was another alumnus of the university. Mikhail Lomonosov, Russian scientist and founder of Moscow University was briefly a student at Kyiv Mohyla Academy.

After 1819, when the university was turned into a purely religious institution, it still upheld its international reputation and has been an alma mater for the Moldavian poet Alexei Mateevici and metropolitan bishop of the Romanian Orthodox Church Visarion Puiu.

Alumni of NaUKMA are employed by national and international companies, research and governmental institutions and many graduates continue their studies abroad. Journalist and politician Andriy Shevchenko, Ukrainian writer Myroslav Laiuk and the contemporary Ukrainian writer Maryna Sokolyan studied at NaUKMA.

== Presidents of Kyiv Mohyla Academy ==
=== Rectors of Kyiv Brotherhood School (1615-1632) ===
- Job Boretsky (1615-1619)
- Meletius Smotrytsky (1619-1620)
- Cassian Sakowicz (1620-1624)
- Spiridon Sobol (1626-1628)
- Khoma (Tomasz) Yevlevich (1628-1632)
- Tarasius Zemka (1632)

=== Rectors of Kyiv Collegium (1632-1658) ===
- Isaiah Trofymovych-Kozlovskyi (1632-1638)
- Sophronius Pochaskyi (1638-1640)
- Leontius Bronkevych (1640)
- Ignatius Oksenovych-Starushych (1640-1642)
- Joseph Kononovych-Horbatskyi (1642-1645)
- Innocent Giesel (1645-1650)
- Lazar Baranovych (1650-1651)
- Meletius Dzyk (1655-1657)
- Joseph Meshcheryn (1657)

=== Rectors of Kyiv Mohyla Academy (1658-1817) ===
- Joannicius Galiatovsky (1658-1662)
- Meletius Dzyk (1662-1665)
- Barlaam Yasynsky (1665-1672)
- Sylvester Holovchych (1672-1684)
- Jezekiel Fylypovych (1684-1685)
- Theodosius Huhurevych (1685-1688)
- Joasaph Krokovsky (1689-1690)
- Pachomius Podluzky (1690-1691)
- Cyrill Fylymonovych (1691-1692)
- Joasaph Krokovsky (1693-1697)
- Procopius Kalachynsky (1697-1701)
- Gedeon Odorsky (1701-1704)
- Innocent Popovsky (1704-1707)
- Christophor Charnutsky (1707-1710)
- Theophan Prokopovych (1711-1716)
- Sylvester Pynovsky (1717-1722)
- Joseph Volchansky (1722-1727)
- Hilarion Levytsky (1727-1731)
- Ambrosius Dubnevych (1731-1735)
- Sylvester Dumnytsky (1737-1740)
- Sylvester Kuliabka (1740-1745)
- Sylvester Liaskoronsky (1746-1751)
- George Konysky (1751-1755)
- Manassiah Maksymovych (1755-1758)
- Davyd Nashchynsky (1758-1761)
- Samuel Myslavsky (1761-1768)
- Tarasius Verbytsky (1768-1774)
- Nicodemus Pankratiev (1774)
- Cassian Lekhnytsky (1775-1784)
- Barlaam Myslavsky (1784-1791)
- Hieronymus Blonsky (1791-1795)
- Theophilact Slonetsky (1795-1803)
- Irineus Falkovsky (1803-1804)
- Joacinth Lohanovsky (1804-1813)
- Joasaph Mokhov (1814-1817)

=== Rectors of Kyiv Theological Academy (1819-1917) ===
- Moses Antipov-Bogdanov (1819-1823)
- Meletius Leontovych (1824-1826)
- Cyrill Kunytsky (1827-1828)
- Platon Berezin (1828)
- Smaragd Kryzhanivsky (1829-1830)
- Innocent Borisov (1830-1839)
- Jeremiah Solovyov (1839-1841)
- Demtrius Muretov (1841-1850)
- Antonius Amfiteatrov (1851-1858)
- Israel Lukin (1858-1859)
- Joannicius Rudnev (1859-1860)
- Filaret Filaretov (1860-1877)
- Michael Luzin (1877-1883)
- Sylvester Malevansky (1883-1898)
- Demetrius Kovalnytsky (1898-1902)
- Platon Rozhdestvensky (1902-1907)
- Theodosius Oltarzhevsky (1907-1910)
- Innocent Yastrebov (1910-1914)
- Basil Bohdashevsky (1914-1917)

=== Presidents of the National University "Kyiv Mohyla Academy" (since 1992) ===
- Viacheslav Briukhovetsky (1992-2007)
- Serhiy Kvit (2007-2014)
- Andriy Meleshevych (2014-2019)
- Serhiy Kvit (since 2022)

== See also ==
- Economics Education and Research Consortium
- List of universities, colleges, and research institutions in Kyiv
- Open access in Ukraine
- List of universities in Ukraine
