= Oleksandr Baranivsky =

Ukrainian politician and agronomist

- Олександр Баранівський
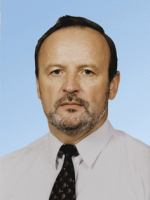

Minister of Agrarian Policy
- In office 4 February 2005 – 4 August 2006
- President: Viktor Yushchenko
- Prime Minister: Yulia Tymoshenko; Yuriy Yekhanurov
- Preceded by: Viktor Slauta
- Succeeded by: Yuriy Melnyk

Personal details
- Born: 28 March 1955 (age 71) Khoroshiv Raion, Zhytomyr Oblast, Ukrainian SSR
- Party: Socialist Party; Justice Party
- Education: Zhytomyr Agricultural Institute
- Occupation: politician, agronomist

Oleksandr Petrovych Baranivsky (Ukrainian: Олександр Петрович Баранівський) (born 28 March 1955) is a Ukrainian politician and agronomist. Baranivsky served as Minister of Agrarian Policy (2005–2006). He was also member of Ukrainian parliament (Verkhovna Rada) (2002–2005, 2006–2007).

First Secretary of the Zhytomyr Regional Committee of the Socialist Party (1998–2005).

== Early life ==
Baranivsky was born on 28 March 1955 in the village of Hayky (now part of Zhytomyr Raion), which was then part of the Ukrainian SSR in the Soviet Union. For his undergraduate degree, he went to the Zhytomyr Agricultural College from 1970 to 1974, and then started working in the agricultural sector. He started by working on the Shevchenko collective farm in the Ozera village (also located in Zhytomyr), then at the Zhdanov collective farm in Dashynka, and then at the Dzerzhinsky collective farm.

In 1982, he received his PhD in economics from the Zhytomyr Agricultural Institute. After graduating, he started working in politics by becoming First Deputy Chairman of the Korostyshiv District Executive Committee, and then as party worker in the Zhytomyr Oblast. From 1991 to 1992 he was the Representative of the President of Ukraine in the Dzerzhinsky district (in Kharkiv).

== Political career ==
He first became involved in national politics when he worked as an assistant-consultant to the People's Deputy Vasyl Sinko (also of the Socialist Party), and then from 2005 to 2006 he was appointed as Minister of Agrarian Policy. In 2011 he became Deputy Chairman of the Justice Party after it was formed from a merger.

== Awards ==
- Order of Merit III class (2010).

Political offices
Preceded by Viktor Slauta	Minister of Agrarian Policy; 2005–2006	Succeeded by Yuriy Melnyk
