= Syria–Ukraine relations =

- Syria: Ukraine

Diplomatic mission
- Embassy of Syria, Kyiv: Embassy of Ukraine, Damascus

Relations between Syria and Ukraine have existed since 1992, except for a three-year period from 2022 to 2025 when they were severed following Ba'athist Syria's recognition of the Russian-occupied Donetsk and Luhansk regions. Relations were reestablished after the collapse of the Assad regime. The Ukrainian embassy in Lebanon currently protects Ukrainian interests in Syria.

== History ==
=== Ba'athist Syria ===
Ba'athist Syria–Ukraine relations
- Syria: Ukraine

Syria recognized the independence of Ukraine on 28 December 1991. The countries established diplomatic relations on 31 March 1992.

Ukraine opened its embassy in Damascus in February 2000, while Syria opened its embassy in Kyiv in August 2004.

President Bashar al-Assad visited Kyiv and met with Ukrainian President Viktor Yanukovych in December 2010. He stressed bilateral relations between the two countries and the work on signing of a Free Trade Agreement between the two countries.

With the start of the Syrian civil war in 2011, Ba'athist Syria became even closer politically to the Russian Federation. Due to Ba'athist Syria's recognition of the Russian occupation of Crimea in 2014, bilateral relations were frozen. Citing human rights violations by the government of Bashar al-Assad against Syrian civilians, Ukraine closed its embassy in Damascus in 2016, and in 2018, ordered the closure of the Syrian embassy.

On 29 June 2022, Ba'athist Syria recognized the independence of the Donetsk and Luhansk People's Republics from Ukraine, after which on 30 June 2022, Ukraine severed relations with Syria. Ba'athist Syria formally broke its diplomatic ties to Ukraine on 20 July 2022, citing the principle of reciprocity.

=== Post-Ba'athist Syria ===
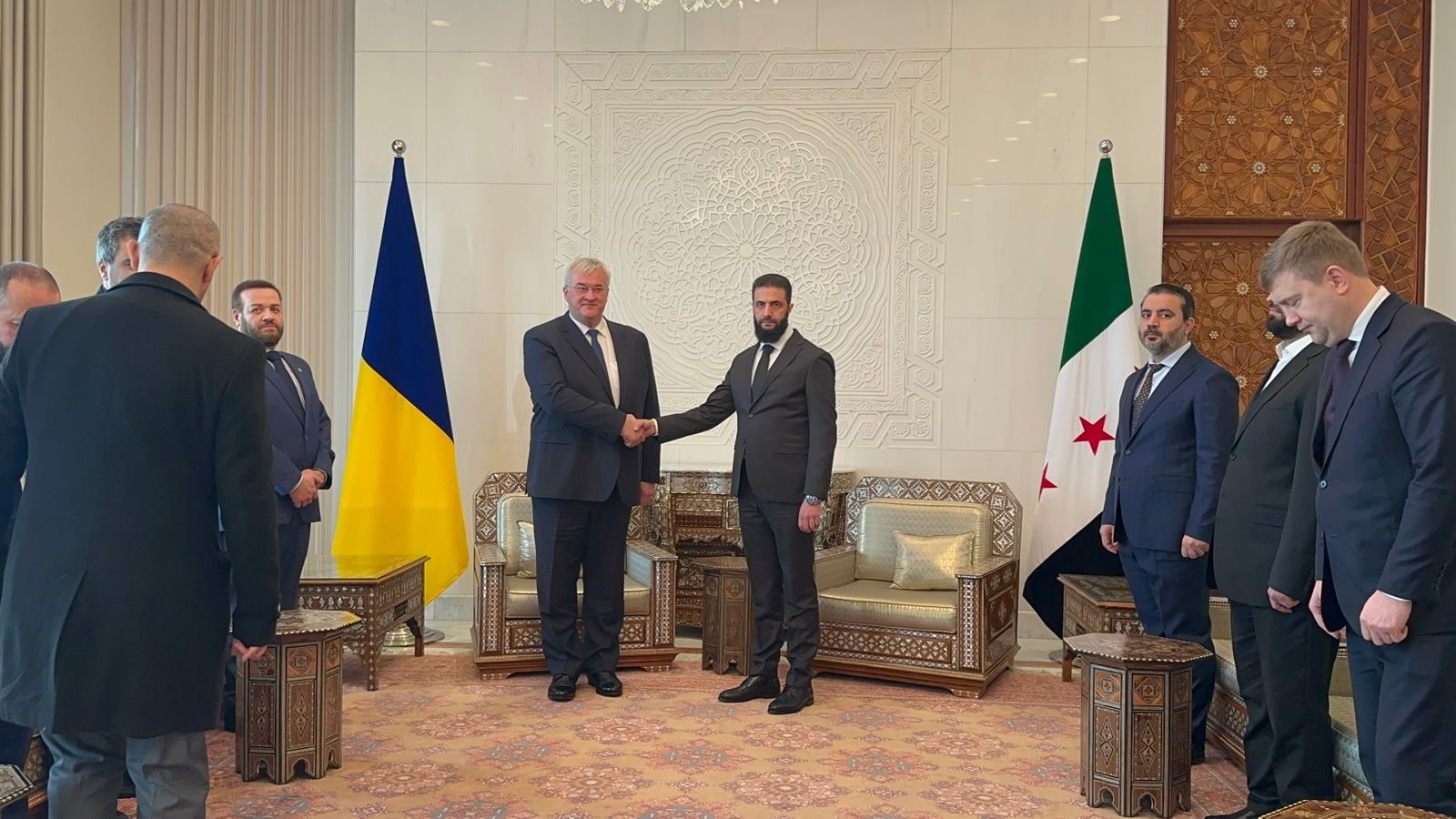
Meeting between delegations led by Andrii Sybiha of Ukraine and Ahmed al-Sharaa of Syria, held in Damascus on 30 December 2024, to discuss the restoration of bilateral relations.

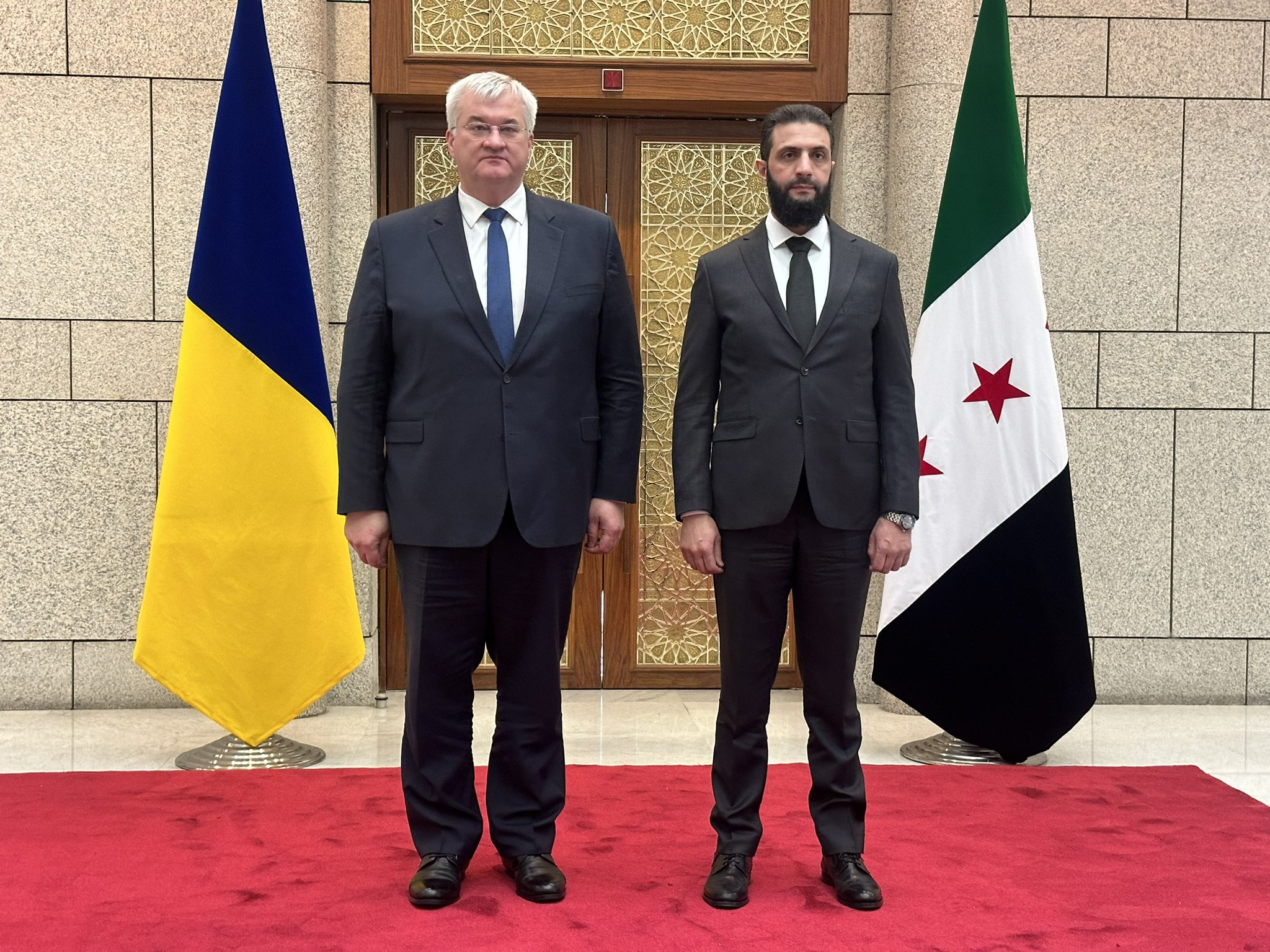
Syrian de facto leader Ahmed al-Sharaa (right) with Ukrainian Minister of Foreign Affairs Andrii Sybiha (left) on 30 December 2024.

After the fall of the al-Assad regime in December 2024, Ukraine urged the international community to work together to support lasting peace in Syria and offered humanitarian aid through the Grain From Ukraine program. President Volodymyr Zelenskyy stated he was ready to support the Syrian transitional government. Later that month, Zelenskyy confirmed that 500 metric tons of wheat flour had been sent to Syria as part of his country's humanitarian Grain From Ukraine program.

On 30 December 2024, Ukraine's top diplomat met with Syria's de facto leader, Ahmed al-Sharaa, in Damascus. The high-level Ukrainian delegation included Ukraine's Minister of Foreign Affairs, Andrii Sybiha, the Minister of Agrarian Policy and Food, Vitaliy Koval, and the Special Representative of the President of Ukraine. Later that day, Ukraine opened an honorary consulate in Damascus. Sybiha led the flag-raising ceremony alongside Honorary Consul General Tamer Al-Tounsi, a Ukrainian-Syrian entrepreneur, and members of the Ukrainian community, whom he thanked for preserving the Ukrainian language and culture.

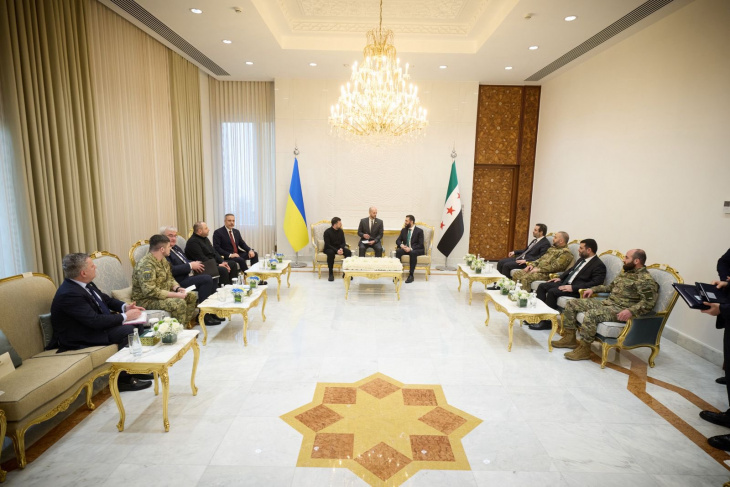
Ukrainian President Volodymyr Zelenskyy met Syrian President Ahmed al-Sharaa at the People's Palace during Zelenskyy's visit to Syria on 5 April 2026.

During the meeting, Syria's newly appointed Foreign Minister Asaad Hassan al-Shaybani expressed interest in building "strategic partnerships" with Ukraine, emphasizing mutual sovereignty and diplomatic representation. Ukrainian Foreign Minister Sybiha discussed the potential for strengthening Ukrainian-Syrian relations and Ukraine’s role in Syria’s food security despite the ongoing conflict with Russia. Sybiha also criticized the Russian and Assad regimes, stating that the removal of Russian forces from Syria would contribute to stability in the Middle East and Africa. In a related statement, Syria's al-Sharaa acknowledged the country's strategic ties with Russia, citing Russian-supplied arms and expertise in infrastructure, and opposed any calls for a complete Russian withdrawal.

On 2 January 2025, Ukrainian President Volodymyr Zelenskyy announced plans to re-establish diplomatic relations with Syria. Zelenskyy and al-Sharaa formally restored their countries' ties on 24 September at the eightieth session of the United Nations General Assembly.

A Ukrainian contingent led by Zelenskyy visited Damascus on 5 April 2026. Amid the 2026 Iran war, Zelenskyy said he and al-Sharaa were interested in "exchanging military and security experience". Sybiha and al-Shaybani also agreed to reopen their respective embassies in the future.

=== High level visits ===
Guest	Host	Place of visit	Date of visit	Notes
(Ukraine) President Leonid Kuchma	(Ba'athist Syria) President Bashar al-assad	Damascus	20-21 April 2002	
(Ba'athist Syria) President Bashar al-assad	(Ukraine) President Viktor Yanukovych	Kyiv	3 December 2010	
(Ukraine) President Volodymyr Zelenskyy	(Syria) President Ahmed al-Sharaa	Damascus	5 April 2026	The first visit since the fall of the al-Assad regime. Large Syrian and Ukrainian flags were displayed in the People's Palace.

== See also ==
- Foreign relations of Syria
- Foreign relations of Ukraine
- Foreign involvement in the Russian invasion of Ukraine
