= Ivan Bisiuk =

Ukrainian politician

- Іван Бісюк

First Deputy Minister of Agrarian Policy and Food of Ukraine
- In office 24 December 2012 – 27 February 2014
- Minister: Mykola Prysyazhnyuk

Personal details
- Born: 3 January 1962 (age 64) Maly Rozhyn, Kosiv Raion, Ivano-Frankivsk Oblast, Ukrainian SSR
- Education: National University of Life and Environmental Sciences of Ukraine

Ivan Yuriiovych Bisiuk (Ukrainian: Іван Юрійович Бісюк) is a Ukrainian politician and veterinarian. He has held the positions of First Deputy Minister of Agrarian Policy and Food and chairman of Agrarian Party of Ukraine.

== Biography ==
Ivan Bisyuk was born January 3, 1962, in Maly Rozhyn (Kosiv Raion, Ivano-Frankivsk Oblast, Ukrainian SSR). He initially graduated from the Veterinary Faculty of the Ukrainian Agricultural Academy, and then worked as a veterinary doctor at the Sovky state farm within the Sviatoshynskyi District of Kyiv. In January 1989, he was appointed the chief veterinary doctor of Sovky. After the collapse of the Soviet Union, he headed the veterinary service for the Sviatoshynskyi District, and then in August 1994 was appointed director of the Shpytkivskyi state farm, which is also located in Sviatoshynskyi.

== Political career ==
From 2000 to 2005, he served as Head of the Pereiaslav-Khmelnytskyi Raion State Administration of Kyiv Oblast. He also entered postgraduate education for politics, as in 2003 he graduated from the National Academy for Public Administration with a specialization in "public administration". Then, from 2006 to 2007, he was Head of the State Department of Veterinary Medicine and Chief State Inspector of Veterinary Medicine, before switching in 2007 to become First Deputy Head of the Department of rCoordination of Agrarian Policy.

By the Decree of the President of Ukraine No. 382/2012 dated June 8, 2012, he was appointed Deputy Minister of Agrarian Policy and Food of Ukraine - Chief of Staff. By the Decree of the President of Ukraine of September 12, 2012, No. 539/2012, Bisiuk was appointed First Deputy Minister of Agrarian Policy and Food of Ukraine. He held this position until July 2, 2014.
