= Agrarian Party of Ukraine =

Agrarian Party of Ukraine Аграрна партія України
- Abbreviation: APU
- Leader: Mykhailo Poplavskyi
- Deputy Leaders: Yurii Krutko; Volodymyr Yevdokymov; Inna Kostyria
- Founded: 7 October 2006
- Registered: 15 November 2006
- Headquarters: Vasylkivska 37, Kyiv
- Youth wing: Molodizhne krylo
- Ideology: Agrarianism; Liberal conservatism
- Political position: Centre to centre-right
- Colours: Green; Yellow; Light blue
- Verkhovna Rada: 0 / 450
- Regions: 355 / 43,122

Party flag

Website
- agroparty.org.ua

Agrarian Party of Ukraine (Ukrainian: Аграрна партія України, romanized: Ahrarna partiia Ukrainy) is a centre-right agrarian and liberal-conservative political party in Ukraine, led by the former People's Deputy of Ukraine Mykhailo Poplavskyi since 12 June 2020. Formally founded in 1996, this Agrarian Party has been revived in October 2006 and was legally registered as a party by the Ministry of Justice in November.

== History ==
Initially Agrarian Party of Ukraine was created and registered in 1996, but soon after electing Volodymyr Lytvyn the party was renamed couple of times and now is known as the People's Party.

In 2006 the "Agrarian Party" was resuscitated by registering anew. The party was headed by Bloc Yulia Tymoshenko MP's Mikhail Zubets and Mikhail Gladius. In August 2006 they became part of the parliamentary coalition supporting the Second Yanukovych government.

Between 2010 and 2014, the party is chaired alternately by members of the First and Second Azarov government: Deputy Prime Minister for Agricultural Policy Viktor Slauta and Deputy Minister of Agrarian Ivan Bysyuk.

In the 2010 Ukrainian local elections, the party gains 15th place in Ukraine: 410 members are elected into local councils.

In 2014, Vitaliy Skotsyk became chairman of the party.

In 2015, Agrarian Party was among the most active during local elections and placed fifth among all parties nationwide by number of representatives.

From March 2016 until January 2018 veteran politician Roman Bezsmertnyi was one of the party leaders of the Agrarian Party of Ukraine.

According to the Agrarian Party party leader Skotsyk was expelled from the party on 12 September 2018 for "actions that harm the authority and discredit the governing body of the party and the party as a whole". Deputy leader of APU's Kirovohrad regional branch, Yurii Krutko was elected as Skotsyk's successor.

On 3 January 2019, Skotsyk did file documents with the Central Election Commission for registration as a candidate for the 2019 Ukrainian presidential election; claiming to do so as a candidate of the Agrarian Party. The following day the party denied this because they had expelled him. The Central Election Commission registered Skotsyk as a candidate on 8 January, he was registered as a self-nominated candidate.

In the 2019 Ukrainian parliamentary election the party gained 0.51% of the national vote and no parliamentary seats. However, a self-nominated member of the party, Ivan Chaikivskyi has won an election in the №165 single-member district. After the election, Chaikivskyi has joined the For the Future parliamentary group, later joining the newly-founded party based on the parliamentary group.

Before 2020 Ukrainian local elections, the party has announced that it has elected a pop singer, No.1 in APU's list for the 2019 Ukrainian parliamentary election, Mykhailo Poplavskyi as its new leader. In the local elections itself the party has won 355 deputies (312 directly, and 43 through self-nominated candidates), accounting for 0,82% of all seats available that election, losing as much as about 3000 deputies, compared to the previous local elections result.

== Ideology ==
Party describes itself as "an effective center-right liberal-conservative party of the European type, built on democratic principles "from the bottom up". According to the APU's website, it is a "party based on traditional spiritual, moral and legal values, inviolability of private property, limitation of state intervention, development of local self-government". Party is promoting mixed economy, while also actively standing against land market, protesting against it in 2017, and publicly addressing President Volodymyr Zelenskyy, to refuse any law draft proposals on land market and ban the possibility to sell land to foreigners and oligarchs completely.

== Leadership ==
- Mykhailo Zubets (7 October 2006 – 11 September 2010)
- Viktor Slauta (11 September 2010 – 3 July 2012)
- Ivan Bisyuk (3 July 2012 – 20 September 2014)
- Vitaliy Skotsyk (20 September 2014 – 12 September 2018)
- Yurii Krutko (12 September 2018 – 12 June 2020)
- Mykhailo Poplavskyi (12 June 2020 – present)

== Election results ==
=== Verkhovna Rada ===
| Year | Votes | % | Seats won | +/- | Government |
|---|---|---|---|---|---|
| 2012 | 16,225 | 0.08 | 0 / 450 | | Extra-parliamentary |
| 2019 | 75,509 | 0.52 | 0 / 450 | 0 | Extra-parliamentary |

=== Local elections ===
| Election | Leader | Seats |
|---|---|---|
| 2010 | Viktor Slauta | 410 / 224,741 |
| 2015 | Vitaliy Skotsyk | 3,196 / 158,399 |
| 2020 | Mykhailo Poplavskyi | 355 / 43,122 |

== See also ==
- Agrarian Party of Russia
- Belarusian Agrarian Party
