= Dmytro Fedotenkov =

Ukrainian businessman and restaurateur

- Дмитро Федотенков
- Born: August 15, 1980 (age 46)
- Citizenship: Ukraine
- Occupations: Businessman, restaurateur
- Known for: Co-founding Tarantino Family
- Children: 3

Dmytro Valeriyovych Fedotenkov (Ukrainian: Дмитро Валерійович Федотенков; also transliterated as Dmitry Fedotenkov; born 15 August 1980) is a Ukrainian businessman and restaurateur. He is best known as a co-founder of the Kyiv-based restaurant group Tarantino Family. Earlier in his career, he was a shareholder and director of the frozen-food distributor Agama-Trade and served as first deputy chairman of Ukraine's State Agency for Fisheries.

== Early career and public service ==
Fedotenkov was a shareholder and director of Agama-Trade, a distributor of frozen and chilled food products, including seafood. Industry reporting described the company as Kyiv's largest supplier of deep-frozen foods. In 2007 it recorded turnover of US$200 million and operated seven branches across Ukraine; in 2008 it planned to expand its coverage of the Ukrainian deep-frozen-food market to 30 per cent.

On 24 March 2010, Fedotenkov became first deputy chairman of the State Agency for Fisheries of Ukraine. In that role, he discussed reform of fisheries enforcement, longer-term allocation of fishing quotas, action against poaching and the return of state-owned ocean-going vessels that had been transferred to offshore structures.

== Restaurant business ==
Fedotenkov and businessman Serhiy Matviyenko co-founded FM Group, which developed the Tarantino Family restaurant group. The group developed restaurant brands including Murakami, Rukkola, Varenychna, Fabius and Harvest. In 2022, Fedotenkov said that the group comprised 58 restaurants operating under a common management structure.

== COVID-19 pandemic and hospitality advocacy ==
During the COVID-19 pandemic, Fedotenkov publicly advocated support for the hospitality sector and criticized restrictions that, in his view, placed a disproportionate burden on restaurants and their employees.

On 2 May 2020, restaurateurs held a protest outside the Office of the President of Ukraine in Kyiv, calling for outdoor restaurant terraces to be permitted to reopen. Fedotenkov had announced the event on social media. The demonstration was staged as a physically distanced outdoor dining area, with masks, gloves and hand sanitiser, and the proceeds were intended for medical workers responding to the pandemic.

== Property investment and dispute with Maksym Mykytas ==
In 2019, Fedotenkov became involved in the proposed redevelopment of a building on the former Arsenal factory site in Kyiv. According to Fedotenkov, developer and former member of parliament Maksym Mykytas invited him to invest in the acquisition of the building for the planned Arsenal Plaza business centre. Fedotenkov stated that he invested US$12 million in the project.

The business relationship later developed into a public dispute. Fedotenkov alleged that Mykytas had falsified his signature and pledged the property without his consent, leaving an unpaid obligation to him. Mykytas gave a different account, alleging that documents concerning the transfer of Ukrbud Development assets had been forged and that Fedotenkov and company executive Oleh Maiboroda had improperly taken control of assets. Maiboroda rejected the forgery allegation, saying that the transfers were made under memoranda known to Mykytas and were conditional on investment in the completion of the developer's projects. The competing claims became the subject of criminal investigations and court proceedings.

== Criminal proceedings ==
The State Bureau of Investigation (SBI) opened criminal proceedings connected with the Ukrbud asset dispute in April 2021. In May 2023, Ukrainian media reported that the Prosecutor General's Office had notified Fedotenkov of suspicion under Article 206–2, part 3, of the Criminal Code of Ukraine, concerning the alleged unlawful acquisition of corporate rights using forged documents. On 21 July 2023, the Pecherskyi District Court of Kyiv authorised detention in absentia as a pre-trial measure, and Ukrainian authorities subsequently sought an international wanted notice.

In July 2026, the criminal proceedings were closed and the allegations against Fedotenkov were withdrawn; no conviction was entered.

== Business activities in Austria ==
From 2022, Fedotenkov became involved in hospitality ventures in Vienna. Austrian and Ukrainian reporting linked him with the restaurants Buffalino, Rubi and Iris Modern Greek.

Fedotenkov was also an original shareholder of DMGA Gastro GmbH, a Vienna restaurant company incorporated in June 2022. The company is identified in the legal notice of JP Pancakes, a Vienna café specialising in Japanese soufflé pancakes that opened in June 2024.

== Personal life ==
Fedotenkov is married and has three children.
