= Roman Leshchenko =

Ukrainian politician (born 1988)

- Роман Лещенко
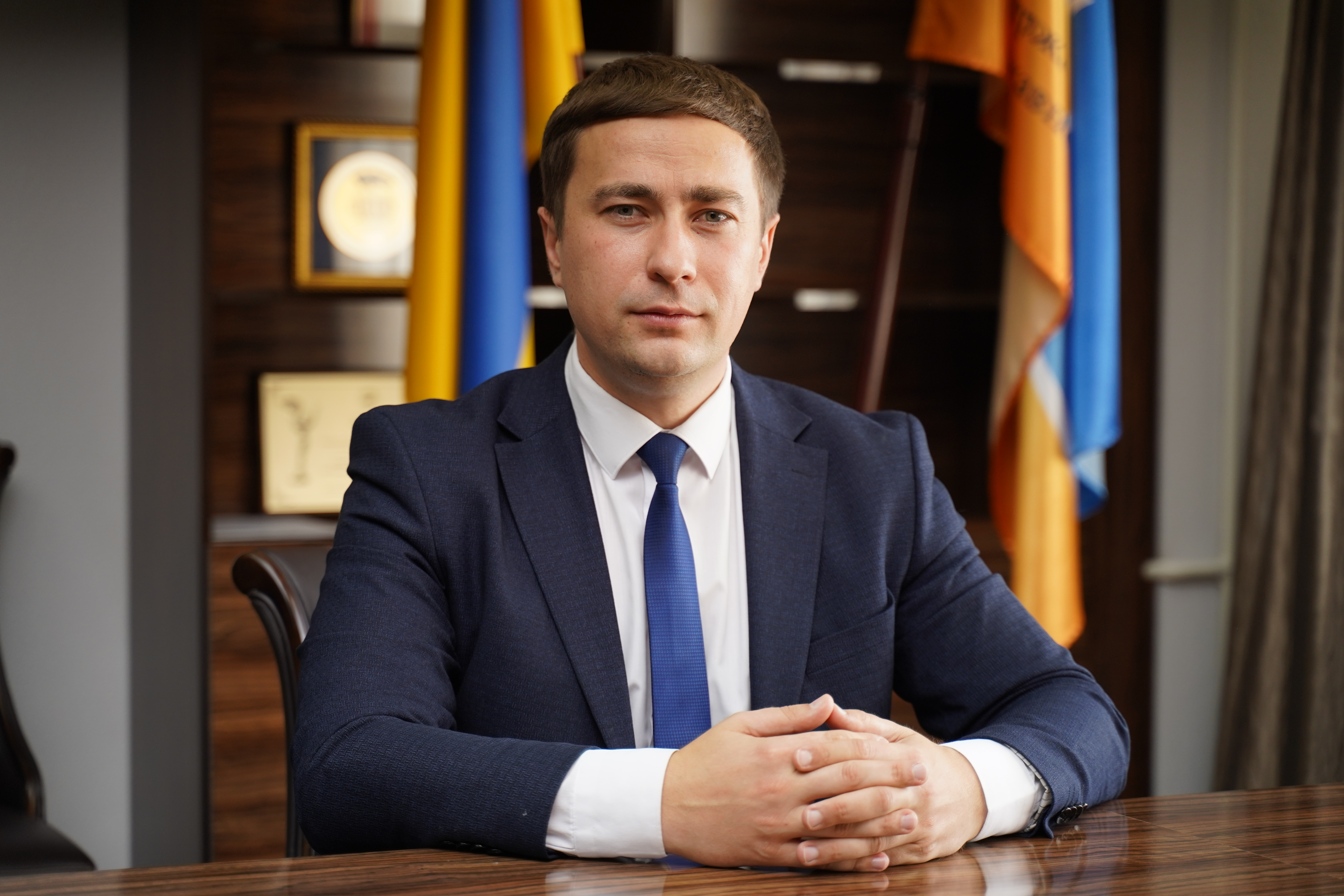
- Official portrait, 2020

Minister of Agrarian Policy and Food
- In office 17 December 2020 – 24 March 2022
- President: Volodymyr Zelenskyy
- Prime Minister: Denys Shmyhal
- Preceded by: Position established
- Succeeded by: Mykola Solskyi

Personal details
- Born: 23 November 1988 (age 37) Penizhkove, Ukrainian SSR, Soviet Union (now Ukraine)

Roman Mykolayovych Leshchenko (Ukrainian: Роман Миколайович Лещенко; born 23 November 1988) is a Ukrainian politician who served as Minister of Agrarian Policy and Food from December 2020 to March 2022. Head of the State Service of Ukraine for Geodesy, Cartography and Cadastre (2020), Commissioner of the President of Ukraine for Land Issues since 1 October 2019, lawyer, instructor, agricultural entrepreneur.

== Early life and education ==
Leshchenko was born on 23 November 1988, in the village of Penizhkove, Khrystynivka Raion of Cherkasy Oblast. He studied at the Law School of Taras Shevchenko National University of Kyiv. Candidate of Juridical Sciences, defended the dissertation Financial and Legal Regulation of Offshore Mechanisms, specialty 12.00.07, in 2015.

== Career and political activities ==
From 2007, Leshchenko worked for the OSG Group, occupied the position of the main legal consultant of the holding.

Since 1 September 2013, Leshchenko has been an assistant at the Department of Financial Law at the Law School of Taras Shevchenko National University of Kyiv. The areas of his professional interest are International Financial Law, Tax Law, Banking Law.

On 1 October 2019, Leshchenko was appointed to the position of the Presidential Commissioner for Land Issues. While occupying this post, he worked on the land reform, took part in preparing and writing Draft Law No 2178-10 on Amendments to Certain Legislative Acts of Ukraine Regarding Circulation of Agricultural Lands as well as at the stage of its consideration in the Verkhovna Rada of Ukraine. He also supported the supply of ₴4 billion to Ukrainian farmers in 2020.

On 10 June 2020, Leshchenko was appointed the Head of the State Service of Ukraine for Geodesy, Cartography and Cadastre.

On 17 December 2020, the Verkhovna Rada (Ukraine's national parliament) appointed Roman Leshchenko as the Minister of Agrarian Policy and Food.

Leshchenko resigned as agriculture minister on 24 March 2022, without stating a reason.

== 2020 Khmelnytskyi Oblast bribery case ==
In December 2020, the Head of the State Geocadastre was offered a bribe in the amount of US$170,000 for clearing and issuing orders to allot land in Khmelnytskyi Oblast to some front persons within programs of interaction with farms. On 9 December 2020, the World Day to Combat Corruption, the National Anti-Corruption Bureau of Ukraine (NABU) detained acting head of the Main Department of the State Geocadastre in Khmelnytskyi Oblast, Yuriy Klymko, on suspicion of attempting to bribe Leshchenko.

According to the investigators, Klymko, along with Oleksiy Kovaliov, who served as an intermediary, were planning to transfer US$170,000 to Leshchenko for issuing orders to allot land plots to counterfeits. They were detained following the transfer of US$25,000, the second such transfer of money. Leshchenko who went to the anti-corruption bodies in early September 2020. After that, NABU detectives, along with the Security Service of Ukraine, began obtaining evidence, eventually leading to the arrests of Klymko and Kovaliov in December 2020.

On 11 December 2020, the Higher Anti-Corruption Court ruled to take the both into custody with the alternative option of bail.

== Assassination attempt ==
On 18 November 2021, the Ministry of Internal Affairs of Ukraine reported that it prevented an attempt to assassinate Leshchenko. The next day, the Pecherskyi District Court of Kyiv took the alleged assassination contractors into custody.

== Personal life ==
Leshchenko is married to Alla Leshchenko, and has two sons, named Mykola and Hennadiy.
