= Ihor Shvaika =

Ukrainian politician

- Ігор Швайка
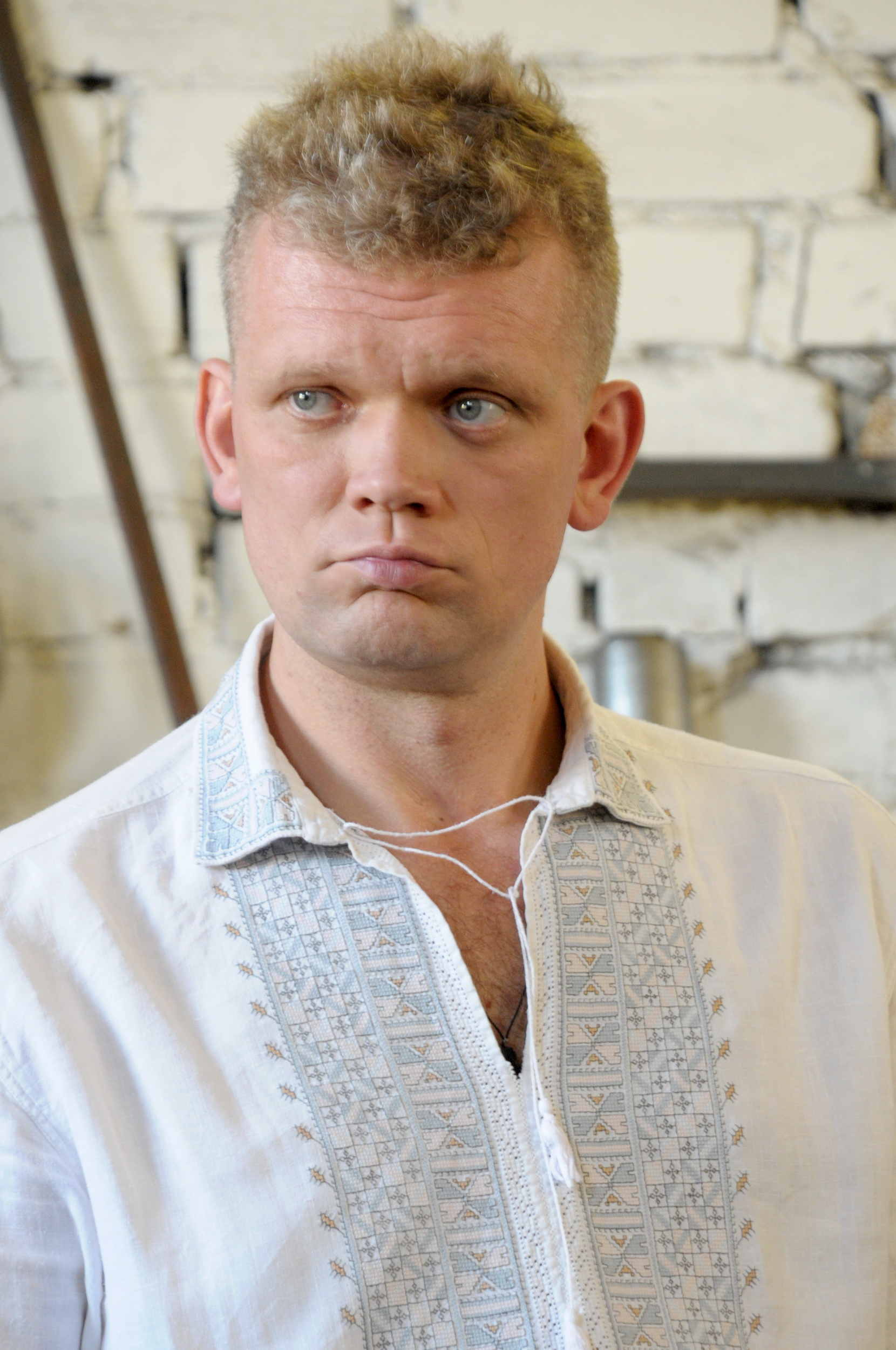

Minister of Agrarian Policy and Food of Ukraine
- In office 27 February 2014 – 12 November 2014
- Prime Minister: Arseniy Yatsenyuk
- Preceded by: Mykola Prysyazhnyuk
- Succeeded by: Oleksiy Pavlenko

Personal details
- Born: 25 February 1976 (age 50) Troyitskoye, Kalmykia
- Party: All-Ukrainian Union "Freedom"
- Education: National University "Yaroslav the Wise Law Academy of Ukraine"

Ihor Oleksandrovych Shvaika (born 25 February 1976) is a right-wing Ukrainian politician and a former Minister of Agrarian Policy and Food of Ukraine. Shvaika was elected to the 7th Ukrainian Verkhovna Rada during the 2012 parliamentary election as a member of the All-Ukrainian Union "Freedom" party.

== Biography ==
Shaivka was born into an ethnic Ukrainian family in the Russian Republic of Kalmykia. In 1978, the family returned to their native town of Lutuhyne, Luhansk Oblast. He graduated from school with honors and entered the National University “Yaroslav the Wise Law Academy of Ukraine” in Kharkiv to study law. During this time he already worked as a legal adviser to a number of private companies. He graduated with a law degree in 1998, and then joined a private law firm called "Terra" as "Deputy Director of Legal Affairs". During the following year he headed the law firm "Ilyashev and partners" and in 2000 he started his own law firm called "Zeus".

== Politics ==
In 2007 he became member (Shvaika IV) of the right wing All-Ukrainian Union "Freedom"; by February 2008 he led the Kharkiv regional chapter. In October 2010 he ran as a candidate for Mayor of Kharkiv, receiving 0.84% of the vote. During the parliamentary elections of Ukraine on 28 October 2012, he was elected to Parliament for "Freedom", which ranked at number eight. He became Deputy Chairman of the 17-member Committee on Rules, Ethics and Support to Work of the Verkhovna Rada of Ukraine.

In the Yatsenyuk Government that came to power on 27 February 2014, Shvaika was Minister of Agrarian Policy and Food of Ukraine.

In the October 2014 parliamentary election Shvaika was 11th on the election list of his party; since the party came 0,29% short to overcome the 5% threshold to win seats on the nationwide list he was not re-elected into parliament.

On 12 November 2014 he and his fellow two Svoboda ministers in the Yatsenyuk Government resigned (they became acting ministers till a new Government was formed).

Since September 2015 Shvaika is a suspect in the investigate of clashes outside the Verkhovna Rada on 31 August 2015. During these clashes between Ukrainian nationalists and security forces a member of the National Guard of Ukraine died after being hit with shrapnel, apparently from a hand grenade. Shvaika has been imprisoned and bailed out multiple times since.

In a 2019 Ukrainian parliamentary election by-election on 15 March 2020 Shvaika (for Freedom) failed to win a parliamentary seat in electoral district 179 located in Kharkiv Oblast because he gained only 2.19% or 853 of the votes.

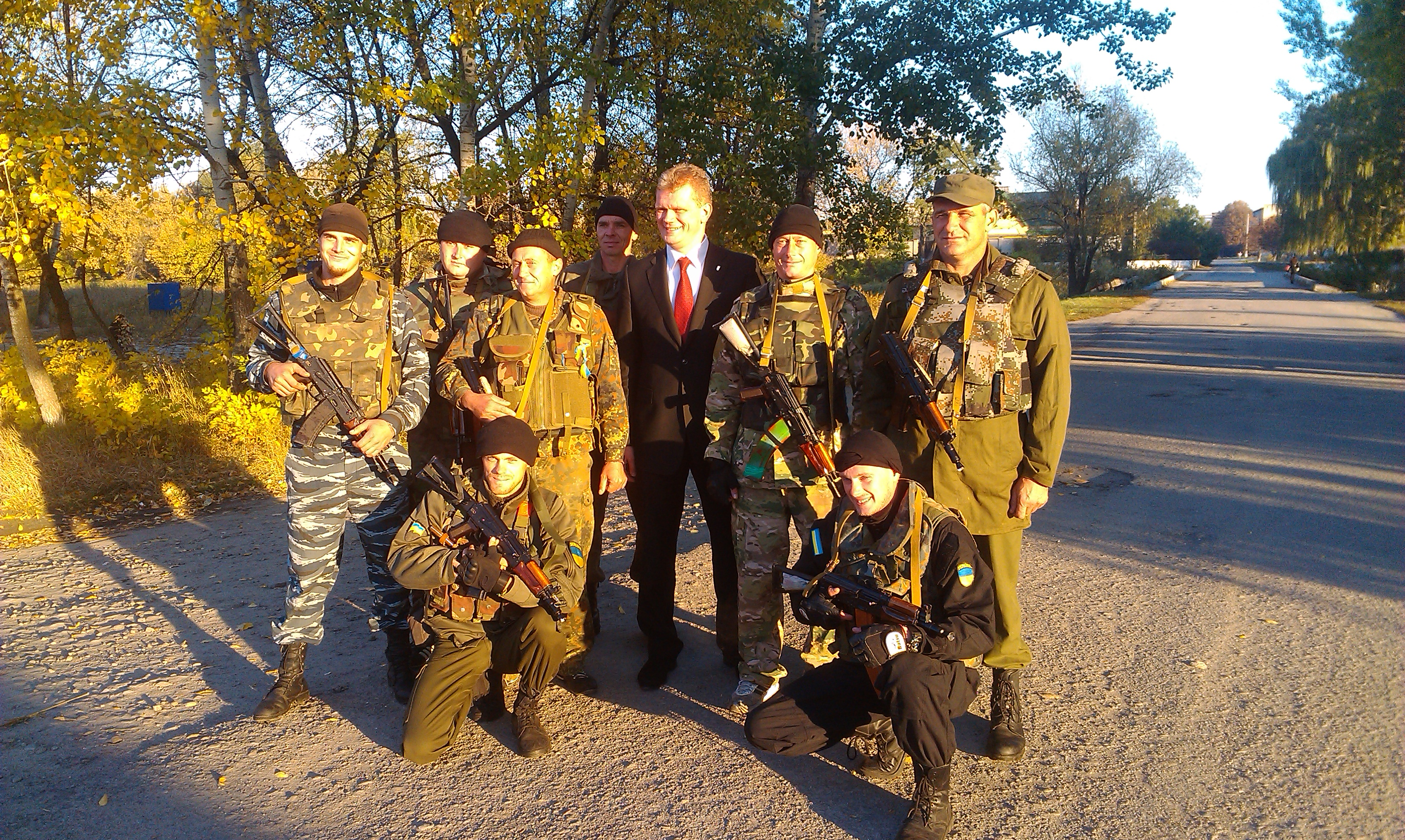
Shvaika with armed pro-Ukrainian residents from Lutuhyne during the War in Donbas

== Private life ==
He has been married three times, and has one daughter and one son.
