= Ihor Tymoshenko =

Ukrainian politician and activist

- Ігор Тимошенко

Governor of Rivne Oblast (acting)
- In office 24 June 2019 – 9 September 2019
- Preceded by: Oleksiy Mulyarenko
- Succeeded by: Vitaliy Koval

Personal details
- Born: Ihor Oleksandrovych Tymoshenko; 22 March 1965 (age 61) Sarny, Rivne Oblast, Ukrainian SSR, Soviet Union

Ihor Oleksandrovych Tymoshenko (Ukrainian: Ігор Олександрович Тимошенко; born on 22 March 1965) is a Ukrainian politician and activist, who had served as the acting governor of Rivne Oblast in 2019.

== Biography ==
From April 2004 to February 2005, he was the head of the Dubrovnik regional state administration.

On 24 June 2019, Tymshenko became the acting governor of Rivne Oblast. On 9 September, he was replaced by his successor, Vitaliy Koval.
