= Oleksiy Pavlenko =

Ukrainian politician and businessman

- Олексій Павленко
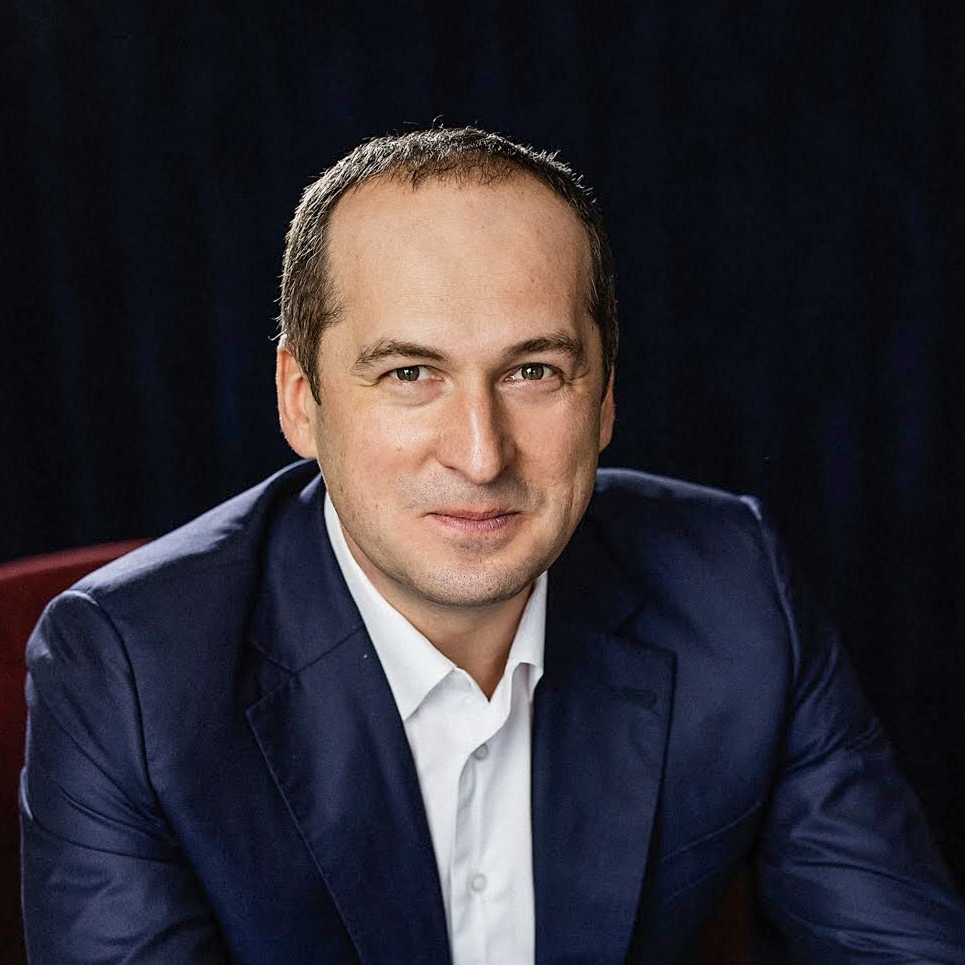

9th Minister of Agrarian Policy and Food
- In office 2 December 2014 – 14 April 2016
- Prime Minister: Arseniy Yatsenyuk
- Preceded by: Ihor Shvaika
- Succeeded by: Taras Kutovy

Personal details
- Born: Олексій Михайлович Павленко
- Education: Kyiv-Mohyla Academy (1998) - Economics; Nyenrode Business University (2002) - MBA

Oleksiy Mykhaylovych Pavlenko (Ukrainian: Олексій Михайлович Павленко; born 2 January 1977) is a Ukrainian businessman and politician who was Minister of Agrarian Policy and Food in the Yatsenyuk Government.

== Education ==
In 1998, Pavlenko earned a Bachelor's degree in Economics from the National University of Kyiv-Mohyla Academy. The following year, he obtained a Specialist degree in Financial Management from the International Institute of Business (IIB – Ukraine). He then continued his studies at the Ukrainian Academy of Foreign Trade (now the Ukrainian State University of Finance and International Trade) where he received a Master's degree in International Business Management in 2000.

In 2001, Pavlenko enrolled at Nyenrode Business University (Netherlands) where he completed a Master of Business Administration in 2002. Later, in 2010, he earned a Candidate of Sciences (equivalent to a PhD) in Economics from the National University of Life and Environmental Sciences of Ukraine. His doctoral dissertation, titled Regulation of Imports of Meat and Meat Products in the Context of the Formation of European Integration Processes of Ukraine, focused on economic regulations within international trade. Since 2022, he has been pursuing a Doctor of Sciences (lit. Doktor Nauk), the highest academic degree in Ukraine, at the same university.

== Career ==
Oleksiy Pavlenko worked at the auditing company KPMG, Kyiv, Ukraine (1997–2001).

Pavlenko worked as a Consultant to the board of directors at ABN AMRO Headquarters, Amsterdam, the Netherlands.

In 2002–2003, he was a member of an Audit Committee, Head of Restructuring team and Business Development team with Damen Shipyards Group (the Netherlands), overseeing projects implementation in Ukraine, Romania and the Netherlands.

In 2003–2006, he worked as the CEO of Group of the companies “Rise” (Ukraine), responsible for general, strategic, and investment management. He implemented efficient budgeting and control systems.

In 2007–2009, he worked as CEO of the Concern Foxtrot “Home Appliance”, responsible for general and investment management in Ukraine and Moldova, overseeing a workforce of 15,000 employees.

Since 2009, he has been a partner at the investment fund Pharus Assets Management, a member of the advisory board of the National University of Kyiv-Mohyla Academy, and a member of the initiative and coordination group “First Professional Reformation Government”.

Oleksiy is a member of YPO (Young Presidents’ Organization) international organization and the CEO Club, Ukraine.

From 2013 till 2014, he was a member of supervisory board at European milk technologies, consulted Agroprogress Holding Ltd and Forum Capital.

From 2014 to 2016, he held the position of Minister of Agrarian Policy and Food of Ukraine.

Since 2015, he has been a member of the supervisory board of the National University of Life and Environmental Sciences of Ukraine (NULES).

Since 2016, Pavlenko has been the Director of the Agro-Industry Development Program at the Ukrainian Institute for the Future.

Since 2017, he has been the Chairman of the Ukrainian-Dutch Business Council.

From 2020 to 2022, he was a member of the board of directors at GN Terminals (UAE/Ukraine).

Since 2023, Pavlenko has been a member of the advisory board and Advisor to the CEO of NIBULON.

Since 2024, he has been a member of the supervisory board of the National University of Kyiv-Mohyla Academy.

Since September 2024, he has been a lecturer at the Department of Global Economics at the National University of Life and Environmental Sciences of Ukraine.

== Publications with Oleksiy Pavlenko ==
- The EU will help to implementat the developing strategy of agricultural sector
- American-Ukrainian conference for support domestic business
- Investment conference New Ukraine
- Oleksiy Pavlenko at BBC World News Business Edition (06.03.2015)
- Oleksiy Pavlenko at BBC World News Today (06.03.2015)
- Oleksiy Pavlenko interview (Sky News channel, 06.03.2015)
- Canada and Israel sighned the Memorandum to support the Ukrainian fruit and vegetable farms
- International support for Ukraine conference
- Seeds of change: Ukrainian minister seeks to bolster country’s agriculture

Political offices
Preceded by Ihor Shvaika	Minister of Agrarian Policy and Food; 2014-2016	Succeeded by Taras Kutovy

== Link ==
- Facebook
- Twitter
