= Taras Vysotskyi =

Ukrainian politician (born 1986)

- Тарас Висоцький
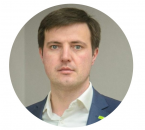
- Official Government of Ukraine portrait

Minister of Agrarian Policy and Food
- Incumbent
- Assumed office 16 July 2026
- President: Volodymyr Zelenskyy
- Prime Minister: Serhii Koretskyi
- Preceded by: Oleksii Sobolev (as minister of economy, environment and agriculture)
- Acting
- In office 14 May 2024 – 4 September 2024
- President: Volodymyr Zelenskyy
- Prime Minister: Denys Shmyhal
- Preceded by: Mykola Solskyi
- Succeeded by: Vitaliy Koval

Personal details
- Born: 6 August 1986 (age 39)
- Party: Independent

Taras Mykolayovych Vysotskyi (Ukrainian: Тарас Миколайович Висоцький; born 6 August 1986) is a Ukrainian politician. He has served as minister of agrarian policy and food since 2026, having previously served as acting minister in 2024. From 2021 to 2025, he served as first deputy minister of agrarian policy and food.
