= Oleksiy Mulyarenko =

Ukrainian politician (born 1976)

- Олексій Муляренко
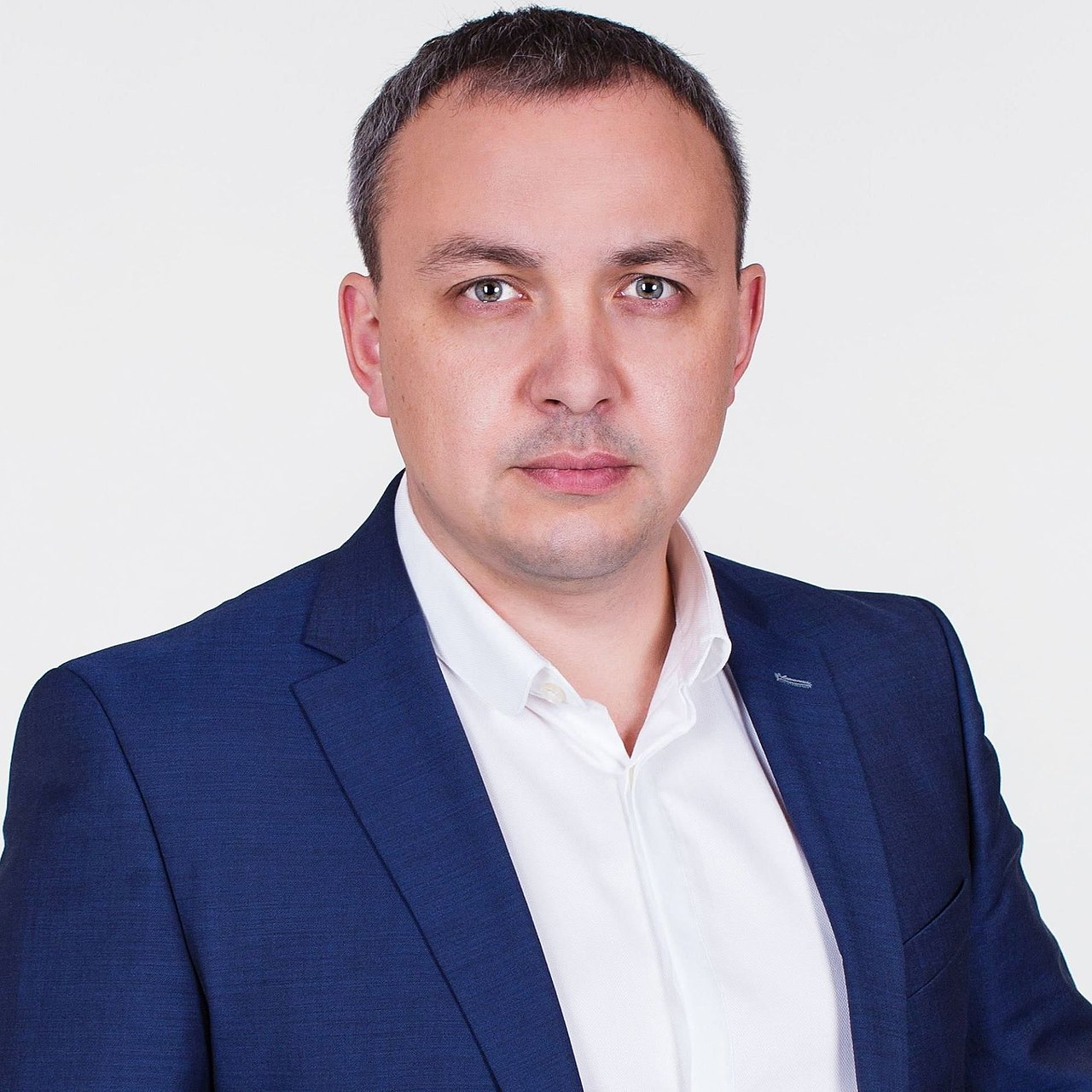
- Official portrait, 2015

Governor of Rivne Oblast
- In office 28 April 2016 – 24 June 2019
- Preceded by: Vitaliy Chuhunnikov
- Succeeded by: Ihor Tymoshenko (acting)

Personal details
- Born: Oleksiy Vitalievich Mulyarenko; 15 October 1976 (age 49) Rivne, Rivne Oblast, Ukrainian SSR, Soviet Union
- Party: Ukrainian Democratic Alliance for Reform (UDAR); Petro Poroshenko Bloc
- Education: Academician Stepan Demianchuk International University of Economics and Humanities
- Occupation: Entrepreneur; Politician

Oleksiy Mulyarenko (Ukrainian: Олексій Муляренко; born 15 October 1976) is a Ukrainian politician. He most notably served as Governor of Rivne Oblast from 2016 to 2019 under President Petro Poroshenko. Before entering politics, he worked in the private sector of Ukraine and became head of the construction-materials company Stal-M. He also served as secretary of the Rivne City Council prior to his governorship.

== Early life ==
Mulyarenko was born on 15 October 1976 in the city of Rivne, which was then part of the Ukrainian SSR in the Soviet Union. His father, Vitaliy, works in construction, specifically for fire-retardant treatment of wooden structures. His mother, Tetiana, is also engaged in construrction. He later graduated from the Academician Stepan Demianchuk International University of Economics and Humanities in Rivne with a degree as a manager-economist. After graduation, he worked as head of a production site at the company "Met-Expo", and just a few months later he became the deputy director of the local branch in Lutsk for "Met-Expo". He then worked as an entrepreneur in the field of armoured doors until 2006, when he became Director of Stal‑M LLC. In April 2017, he became the founder of "Steel Security of Ukraine".

Simultaneously, he became a coordinator for the charity project "Our Children", "Save Lives", and "Our Heart for Children!".

== Political career ==
In 2010, he was nominated by the Ukrainian Democratic Alliance for Reform (UDAR) to the local elections for the Rivne City Council of its 6th convocation, but he ultimately lost and was not chosen as a deputy. Afterwords, he was appointed chairman of the Rivne branch for UDAR, which he did until 2014. However, in early 2013 he was also appointed to the Executive Committee of the Rivne City Counci as a member. According to a regional media report, he took part in the Euromaidan protests and was involved in organizational work at a tent camp.

During the 2014 Ukrainian parliamentary election, he attempted to run for a seat as a People's Deputy of Ukraine in the Verkhovna Rada from the Petro Poroshenko Bloc for single mandate electoral district 153, but was not chosen. Soon after, though, he became an assistant-consultant to the MP Vitaliy Chuhunnikov until Chuhunnikov was appointed as Governor of Rivne Oblast. In 2015, he was elected to the Rivne City Council, and during the first session of the VII convocation he became the secretary of the council.

On 28 April 2016, then President of Ukraine, Petro Poroshenko, appointed him as Governor of Rivne Oblast, replacing Chuhunnikov who was sent to Kyiv. In 2017, during an interview with Uryadovyi Kurier, he stated that decentralization was the oblast's top priority alongside foreign investments, as he wished to diversify the industrial base beyond major Soviet-era enterprises. He also significiantly improved energy efficiency, and the oblast became ranked in Ukraine for doing so. However, there was a surge in northern Rivne oblast during his tenure of Rovno amber mining, which is illegal in Ukraine to mine, and he had to request Interior Minister Arsen Avakov to return units of the National Guard of Ukraine to combat this. He also alleged in 2017 that there were attempts to destabilize Rivne after protestors blocked the regional administration building.

On 19 May 2019, he rewrote a letter of resignation to be approved by the government regarding the post of governor. He was formally dismissed from the post on 24 June 2019, and soon after he announced his candidacy for the 2019 Ukrainian parliamentary election as an independent candidate, but was again not elected. He has since attempted to run repeatedly for a membership again in the Rivne City Council as a member of the Strength and Honor party, but has so far failed to win an election.

== Personal life ==
He was formerly married to Olena Vladyslavivna, an entrepreneur in metal products manufacturing. Together they had three children: Andriy, who took over as director of Stal-M from Oleksiy in 2016 and is linked to the National Corps party, Ivan, and Ariana. He later remarried to Natalia Mulyarenko (née Firko), who was the former head of the Volyn brarnch of the UDAR party and a co-founder of STD GROUP RIVNE. Together they have one son, Oleksiy, and Natalia has a step-son from her previous marriage, Yuriy.
