= Mykola Solskyi =

Ukrainian statesman and politician

- Микола Сольский
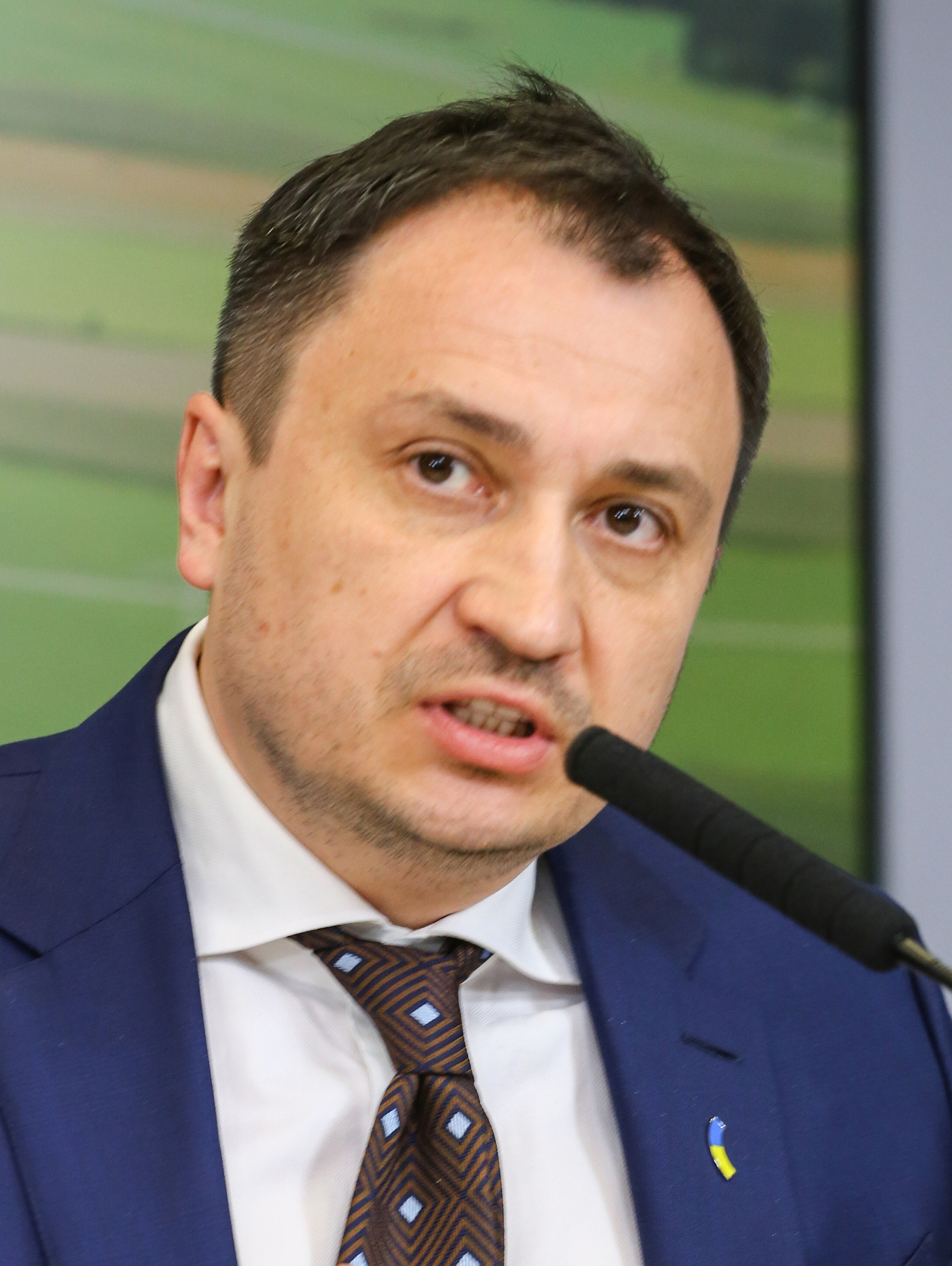
- Solskyi in 2022

Minister of Agrarian Policy and Food
- In office 24 March 2022 – 9 May 2024
- President: Volodymyr Zelenskyy
- Prime Minister: Denys Shmyhal
- Preceded by: Roman Leshchenko
- Succeeded by: Taras Vysotskyi

People's Deputy of Ukraine
- In office 29 August 2019 – 24 March 2022

Personal details
- Born: 22 May 1979 (age 46) Rosokhy, Ukrainian SSR, Soviet Union (now Ukraine)
- Party: Servant of the People
- Education: University of Lviv
- Occupation: Politician

Mykola Tarasovych Solskyi (Ukrainian: Микола Тарасович Сольский; born 22 May 1979) is a Ukrainian jurist and politician. On 24 March 2022, he was appointed as the Minister of Agrarian Policy and Food of Ukraine. Solskyi was elected to the Verkhovna Rada (Ukraine's national parliament) in 2019.

== Biography ==
In 2000, Solskyi graduated from the Faculty of Law of the University of Lviv, majoring in “Jurisprudence”, where he qualified as a lawyer. He started a lawyer career until his political career started, with his last position being (in 2019) Deputy Executive Director of “Procyk and Partners". Since 2007 Solskyi is co-founder of Ukrainian Agrarian Holding. This company is a corporate group of agricultural enterprises and has in management 51 thousand hectares of land.

On 21 July 2019, Solskyi was elected a People's Deputy of Ukraine. He was placed 125th on the election list of the party Servant of the People (but was not a party member).

On 29 August 2019, he was elected Chairman of the Committee of the Verkhovna Rada (Ukraine's national parliament) on Agrarian and Land Policy in the 9th Ukrainian Verkhovna Rada.

On 24 March 2022, Solskyi was appointed as the Minister of Agrarian Policy and Food of Ukraine.

== Allegations of corruption ==
In April 2024, he was named as a suspect in investigations into corruption after the National Anti-Corruption Bureau of Ukraine (NABU) uncovered a scheme led by him to illegally acquire state-owned land. NABU claimed that this scheme of a criminal group led by Solskyi operated from 2017 to 2021, during which the participants seized 1,250 land plots totaling 2,493 hectares. Solskyi denied the allegations and on 23 April stated that he did not plan to tender his resignation. According to Solskyi, the disputed transactions were legal and involved military veterans legally entitled to the land who then leased it to private firms and that the case been settled by the Supreme Court of Ukraine, which had upheld the veterans’ claims. While Ukrainian prosecutors claimed that the original ownership deeds of the plots of land had been destroyed.

On 25 April Solskyi did submit his resignation (Note: In Ukraine a government minister that has submitted a resignation technically remains in office until parliament reviews this request.) to the Verkhovna Rada and was subsequently ordered arrested by the High Anti-Corruption Court of Ukraine. On 26 April he was released from custody after a bail of 75.7 million hryvnias ($1.9 million) was posted. The Verkhovna Rada formally dismissed him as minister on 9 May.

== See also ==
- Shmyhal Government
