= Serhiy Podolin =

- Сергій Подолін

Governor of Rivne Oblast (acting)
- In office 21 November 2023 – 27 December 2023
- Preceded by: Vitaliy Koval
- Succeeded by: Oleksandr Koval

Deputy Governor of Rivne Oblast
- Incumbent
- Assumed office 22 November 2019

Personal details
- Born: Serhiy Viktorvych Podolin; 4 January 1971 (age 55) Rivne, Ukrainian SSR, Soviet Union
- Party: Independent
- Other political affiliations: Servant of the People

Serhiy Viktorovych Podolin (Ukrainian: Сергій Вікторович Подолін; born on 4 January 1971), is a Ukrainian statesman, who had served as the acting governor of Rivne Oblast in 2023.

He is currently serving as the first deputy governor of Rivne Oblast since 22 November 2019.

== Biography ==
Serhiy Podolin was born in Rivne on 4 January 1971.

He graduated from high school No. 11 in Rivne. In 1994, he graduated from the Kyiv State Polytechnic Institute, majoring in radio engineering, with the qualification of radio engineer.

In 1994 to 2005, he worked in management positions at Kadet-SVS LLC in Rivne.

From 2005 to 2007, he was the deputy head of the Rivne District State Administration. In 2007, he was promoted to first deputy head, and then demoted to deputy head again in 2010. By that same year, he obtained a master's degree in public administration at the Lviv Regional Institute of Public Administration of the National Academy of Public Administration under the President of Ukraine.

He had been a member of the Rivne City Council of the 4th convocation, and the Rivne District Council of the 5th and 7th convocations.

On 22 November 2019, Polodin became the first deputy head of the Rivne Regional State Administration.

On 21 November 2023, Pololdin became the acting governor of Rivne Oblast. He was succeeded by Oleksandr Koval
