= Vitaliy Chuhunnikov =

Ukrainian politician

Vitaliy Chuhunnikov Віталій Чугунніков
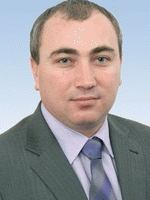

Governor of Rivne Oblast
- In office 26 December 2014 – 28 April 2016
- Preceded by: Yuriy Pryvarskyi (acting)
- Succeeded by: Oleksiy Mulyarenko

Personal details
- Born: Vitaliy Semenovych Chuhunnikov; 21 May 1974 (age 52) Bilhorod-Dnistrovskyi, Ukrainian SSR
- Party: UDAR
- Education: Kharkiv Polytechnic Institute

Vitaliy Semenovych Chuhunnikov (Ukrainian: Віталій Семенович Чугунніков; born 21 May 1974) is a Ukrainian politician and entrepreneur. Chuhunnikov previously served as Governor of Rivne Oblast, representing the UDAR party, from 2014 to 2016 during the presidency of Petro Poroshenko and as a People's Deputy of Ukraine in the Verkhovna Rada from 2012 to 2014.

== Early life ==
Chuhunnikov was born on 21 May 1974 in Bilhorod-Dnistrovskyi, which was then part of Odesa Oblast in the Ukrainian SSR. After graduating from secondary school, he attended Kharkiv Polytechnic Institute, where he graduated from in 1996 with a degree in mechanical engineering. After graduation, he started work in the telecommunications industry, working in various jobs until 2003. From 2003 to 2005 he became head of the sales department for «Караван-плюс» (Karavan-Plus), an advertising company located within Kherson. From 2006 up until his election to the Rada, he was the director of the company called "Ukr-Kom" inn Rivne.

== Political career ==
Prior to entering the Rada, he served as head of the Rivne regional branch for the UDAR party. During the 2012 Ukrainian parliamentary election, he ran for a seat to be a People's Deputy of Ukraine for the 7th convocation as a member of UDAR which was then led by Vitali Klitschko, which he managed to win as he was no. 18 on the party list. During his time in the Rada, he served as Secretary of the Committee on Construction, Urban Development, Housing and Communal Services, and Regional Policy. He served in this position until 2014.

In 2014-2016, he served as a Governor of Rivne Oblast. During this time, in 2015, he attempted to run in the 2015 local elections for the Rivne Regional Council under European Solidarity, but was not elected.

== Personal life ==
He is married to Iryna Volodymyrivna, who is a private entrepreneur, and together they have two daughters named Viktoriia and Maryna.
