= Ministry of Agrarian Policy and Food (Ukraine) =

Government ministry of Ukraine

- Міністерство аграрної політики та продовольства України
- Official logo

- Emblem

Agency overview
- Formed: 15 June 1917
- Preceding agency: Ministry of Agrarian Policy
- Superseding agency: Ministry of Economic Development, Trade and Agriculture.
- Jurisdiction: Government of Ukraine
- Headquarters: 24, Khreschatyk street, Kyiv, Ukraine, 01001
- Agency executive: Taras Vysotskyi, Minister of Agrarian Policy
- Website: Official website

Flag of the ministry

The Ministry of Agrarian Policy and Food (Ukrainian: Міністерство аграрної політики та продовольства, romanized: Ministerstvo ahrarnoyi polityky ta prodovolʹstva) is the central executive authority of Ukraine in charge of country's agro-development. It is one of the oldest government agencies of Ukraine.

The ministry's activity is coordinated by the Cabinet of Ukraine. Ministry is the main authority in the system of central government responsible for national agricultural policy supervising and implementation including policy on agriculture and food security, public policy in the fields of fishery and fishery protection, use and reproduction of aquatic resources, regulation of fishery and maritime security, veterinary medicine, species protection, land related questions, mapping and surveying, forestry and hunting, surveillance (monitoring) in agriculture.

== History ==
The precursor of the Ministry of Agrarian Policy and Food of Ukraine was the General Secretariat of Land Affairs, established on June 15, 1917, under the Government (the First Vynnychenko government) of the Central Council of Ukraine.

=== List of names of the precursor of the ministry ===
- Ministry of Agriculture of the Ukrainian SSR
- Ministry of Fruits and Vegetables of the Ukrainian SSR
- Ministry of Rural Construction of the Ukrainian SSR
- Ministry of Meat and Milk Industry of the Ukrainian SSR
- Ministry of Food Industry of the Ukrainian SSR
- Ministry of Preparations of the Ukrainian SSR
- State Committee of the Ukrainian SSR on production and technical provision of agriculture
- Main Administration in gardening, viticulture and wine industry of the Ukrainian SSR
- State Agro-Industrial Committee of the Ukrainian SSR: 1986 - 1992 (part of the State Agro-Industrial Committee of the USSR)
  - Kolhosps (along with the Council of kolhosps of the Ukrainian SSR)
  - Ministry of Bread products of the Ukrainian SSR
  - Ministry of Amelioration and Water Management of the Ukrainian SSR
  - Ministry of Forestry of the Ukrainian SSR
  - Ukrainian Administration in Fishing
  - Ukoopspilka
- State Committee on Social Development of Village: 1991 - 1993
- State Committee on Bread products: 1991 - 1993
- Ministry of Agriculture and Food: 1992 - 1993
- Ministry of Agriculture and Food: 1993 - 1998
  - Administrations of agriculture and food
  - Administrations of agriculture and food in raion state administrations
  - Inspections on preparations and quality of agriculture products of regional state administrations
  - Inspections of state technical supervision on status of agricultural vehicles in regional state administrations
- State Committee on gardening, viticulture and wine industry: 1994 - 1998
- Ministry of Fishing: 1995 - 1997
- Ministry of Agro-Industrial Complex (APK): 1997 - 2000
  - Committee of Food Industry
  - Committee on gardening, viticulture and wine industry
- State Committee of Fishing: 1997 - 2000
- State Committee in monopoly on production and circulation of alcohol, alcoholic beverages, and tobacco products: 1998 - 2000
- Ministry of Agrarian Policy: 2000 - 2011
- Ukrainian State Concern in gardening, viticulture and wine industry: 2000–present

==== State Committee of Agro-Industrial Business ====
(As seen above) in 1985 the Ministry was transformed into the State Committee on Agrarian and Industrial Economy of Ukraine (Ukrainian Soviet Socialist Republic). The head of the committee was Yuriy Kolomiets who at the same time was the first deputy chairman of the council of ministers of the Ukrainian SSR. Oleksandr Tkachenko and Viktor Sytnyk were the first deputies of Kolomiets.

The State Committee (also known as Derzhahroprom) included number of other ministries and its regional branches.

- Ukrainian branch of the VASKhNIL
- Central administration on production and processing of plants
- Central administration of food industry
- Central administration on material and technical supply
- Central administration on human resources and external relations
- Central administration on fruit-vegetable economy and potatoes
- Central administration on production, preparation, and processing of products of animal husbandry
- Central administration on mechanization and electrification
- Central administration on capital construction project and reconstruction
- Forest Ministry
- Ministry of Amelioration and Water Management
- Ministry of Bread Products
- "Ukrholovrybhosp"
- Ukoopspilka
- Republican cooperative and state association on agrarian and industrial construction
- Republican of scientific and production association on agro-chemical servicing of agrarian business
- NASU Institute of Economy
- Department of agrarian production management (Ukrainian science and research institute of economy and organization of agrarian business of Aleksandr Schlichter)
- representatives of the Central administration of statistics (deputy chief), the Ministry of Finance (first deputy), the Derzhplan (first deputy director), the Derzhpostach (first deputy), the Ukrainian Office (Kontor) of Gosbank (deputy director)
- regional branches of all oblasts of Ukraine

==== 2019—2020 and 2025-2026 mergers and restoration ====
On 29 August 2019, the appointed Honcharuk Government did not have a separate Ministry of Agriculture. The ministry's functions were taken over by the Ministry of Economic Development and Trade.

In January 2020 President Volodymyr Zelenskyy stated the need to separate the Ministry of Economic Development, Trade and Agriculture. Early March 2020 the Minister of Economic Development, Trade and Agriculture, Tymofiy Mylovanov refused to head the newly reestablished Ministry of Agriculture, as he did not agree with the economic policies of the new Shmyhal Government.

On 9 July 2020 Zelenskyy predicted that "at maximum in September" Ukraine would have a separate Minister of Agriculture again. On 17 December 2020 the ministry was indeed resurrected with the appointment of Roman Leshchenko as Minister of Agricultural Policy and Food.

On 17 July 2025 the ministry was once again merged, becoming part of an integrated Ministry of Economy, Environment and Agriculture. One year later, on 16 July 2026, the Ministry of Agrarian Policy was restored as a separate agency, with Taras Vysotskyi being appointed its head.

== Structure ==
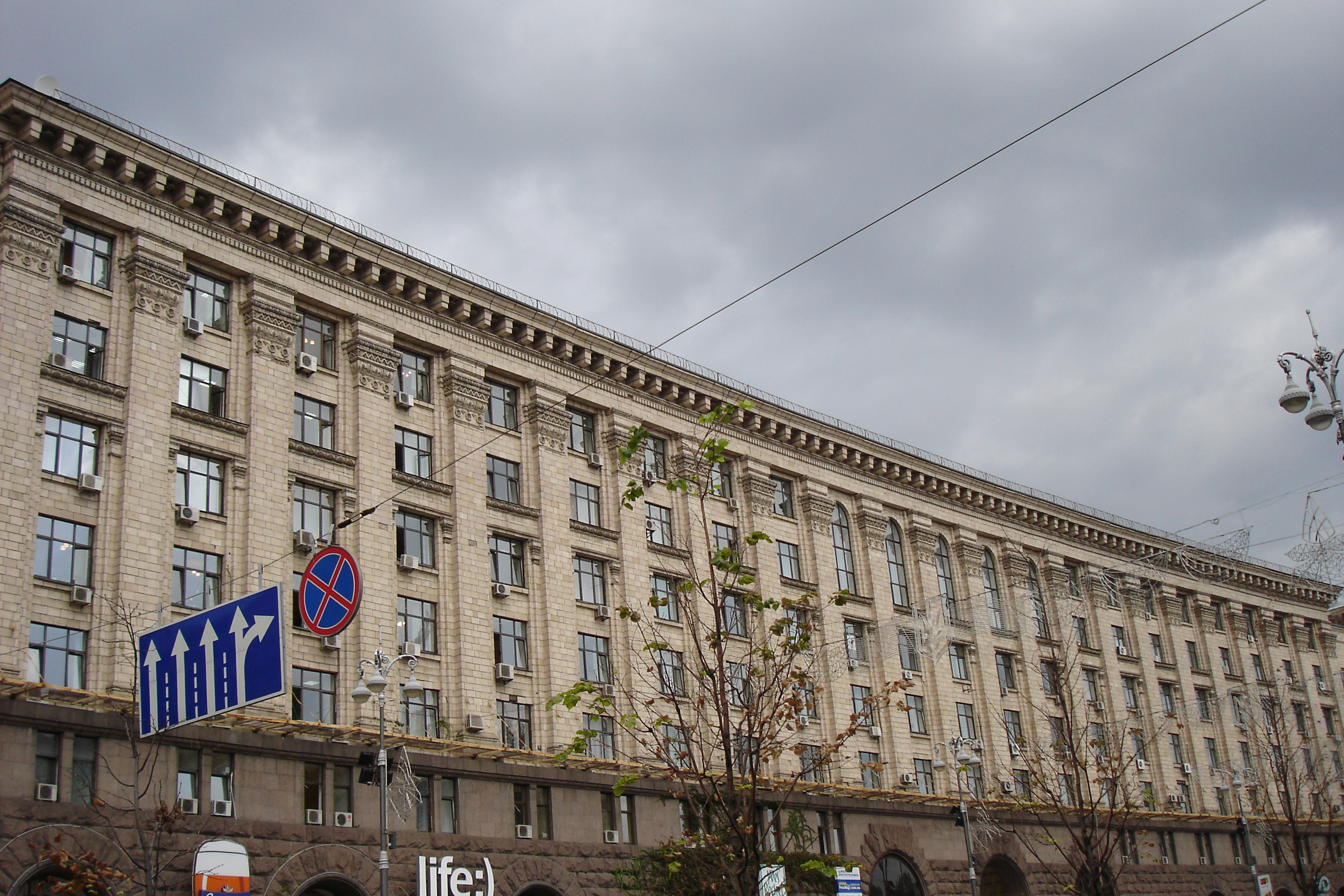
Ministry building in Kyiv

=== Subordinate authorities ===
- State Veterinary and Phytosanitary Service of Ukraine
- State Agency of Land Resources of Ukraine
- State Agency for Forest Resources of Ukraine
- State Agency of Fisheries of Ukraine
- State Agriculture Inspectorate of Ukraine

=== Subdivisions ===
- Office of the support service of the Minister
- Office of Inner Audit
- Department of Legal and Legislative Work
- Anti-Corruption Sector
- Department of Economic Development of Agricultural Market
- Department of financial and credit policy and accounting
- Department of Foreign Economic Relations
- Department of Agriculture
- Department of livestock
- Department of food
- Department for technical support and Agricultural Engineering
- Department of Public Information, interaction with the Cabinet of Ministers of Ukraine and consideration of appeals
- Department of Personnel
- Department of the Control
- Department of Science and Education of Agro-industry and Rural Development
- Department of communication with media, PR and Information
- Office of Management of State Property
- Operational-regime Office
- Sector of Safety and Fire Safety.

=== Ministry commissions ===
- Committee on Rural Development
- Commission of the development of agricultural market of Ukraine
- Committee on Land Relations

=== Scientific institutions ===
- Agricultural higher education institutions
- Research institutions
- Subordinated organization
- Other institutions of Ministry of Agrarian Policy and Food

=== Advisory structures ===
As an advisory structure, under the Ministry acts a Public Council. Its activities are governed by the Regulations of the Public Council. Chairman of the Public Council is Leonid Kozachenko, president of the All-Ukrainian public organization "Ukrainian Agrarian Confederation".

== List of ministers ==
=== Ukrainian People's Republic ===
==== Land cultivation ====
Name of ministry	Name of minister	Term of office	
Name of ministry	Name of minister	Start	End
General Secretariat of Land Affairs	Borys Martos	June 1917	August 1917
General Secretariat of Land Cultivation	Mykhailo Savchenko-Bilskyi	September 1917	December 1917
General Secretariat of Land Cultivation	Bohdan-Oleksandr Zarudnyi	December 1917	January 1918
Ministry of Bread Production	Arystarkh Ternychenko	January 1918	February 1918
Ministry of Land Affairs	Mykola Kovalevskyi	February 1918	April 1918
Ministry of Land Affairs	Vasyl Kolokoltsov	May 1918	October 1918
Ministry of Land Affairs	Volodymyr Leontovych	October 1918	November 1918
Ministry of Land Affairs	Sergei Gerbel	November 1918	December 1918
Ministry of Land Affairs	Mykyta Shapoval	December 1918	February 1919
Ministry of Land Affairs	Eugene Archipenko	February 1919	April 1919
Ministry of Land Affairs	Mykola Kovalevskyi	April 1919	May 1920
Ministry of Land Affairs	Isaak Mazepa	May 1920	November 1920

==== Food ====
Name of ministry	Name of minister	Term of office	
Name of ministry	Name of minister	Start	End
General Secretariat of Food	Mykola Stasyuk	June 1917	August 1917
General Secretariat of Food	Mykola Kovalevskyi	November 1917	January 1918
Ministry of Food	Dmytro Koliukh	January 1918	March 1918
Ministry of Food	Yuriy Sokolovskyi	April 1918	October 1918
Ministry of Food Affairs	Borys Martos	December 1918	February 1919

=== Western Ukrainian People's Republic ===
Name of ministry	Name of minister	Term of office	
Name of ministry	Name of minister	Start	End
State Secretariat of Land Affairs	Stepan Baran	November 1918	December 1918
State Secretariat of Land Affairs	Mykhailo Martynets	December 1918	Summer 1919

=== Ukrainian People's Republic of Soviets ===
Name of ministry	Name of minister	Term of office	
Name of ministry	Name of minister	Start	End
People's Secretariat of Land Affairs	Yevhen Terletskyi	December 1917	March 1918
People's Secretariat of Land Affairs	Vasyl Shakhrai	March 1918	April 1918

In March–April 1918 with the help of Central Powers, Ukraine was liberated from Bolsheviks.

=== Ukrainian Soviet Socialist Republic ===
The following list relates to institutions of the previously created by Bolsheviks Ukrainian People's Republic of Soviets.

Name of ministry	Name of minister	Term of office	
Name of ministry	Name of minister	Start	End
People's Secretariat of Land Affairs	Vladimir Mescheryakov	1919	1919
People's Commissariat of Land Affairs	Dmitry Manuilsky	1920	1921
People's Commissariat of Land Affairs	Miron Vladimirov (Scheinfinkel)	1921	1922
People's Commissariat of Land Affairs	Ivan Klymenko	1922	1925
People's Commissariat of Land Affairs	Yakym Dudnyk	February 1925	December 1926
People's Commissariat of Land Affairs	Alexander Schlichter	1927	1929
People's Commissariat of Land Affairs	Nikolai Demchenko	December 1929	February 1932
People's Commissariat of Land Affairs	Oleksa Tryliskyi	February 1932	October 1932
People's Commissariat of Land Affairs	Aleksandr Odintsov	October 1932	January 1934
People's Commissariat of Land Affairs	Nykyfor Skalyha	January 1934	May 1934
People's Commissariat of Land Affairs	Lev Papernyi	1934	1937
People's Commissariat of Land Affairs	Kostiantyn Moiseyenko	March 1937	July 1937
People's Commissariat of Land Affairs	Zinoviy Siderskyi	July 1937	November 1937
People's Commissariat of Land Affairs	Ivan Murza	1938	1940
People's Commissariat of Land Affairs	Hryhoriy Butenko	1940	1941
People's Commissariat of Land Affairs	Due to World War II, the government was evacuated to Saratov		
People's Commissariat of Land Affairs	Hryhoriy Butenko	1943	1946
Ministry of Land Affairs	Hryhoriy Butenko	1946	1947
Ministry of Agriculture (Rural Economy)	Hryhoriy Butenko	1947	1949
Ministry of Agriculture (Rural Economy)	Vladimir Matskevich	1949	1950
Ministry of Agriculture (Rural Economy)	Nikifor Kalchenko	April 1950	May 1952
Ministry of Agriculture (Rural Economy)	Mark Spivak	April 1952	May 1953
Ministry of Agriculture (Rural Economy) and Preparations	Mark Spivak	1953	1953
Ministry of Agriculture (Rural Economy)	Mark Spivak	1953	1965
Ministry of Agriculture (Rural Economy)	Petro Doroshenko	1965	1971
Ministry of Agriculture (Rural Economy)	Petro Pohrebnyak	1971	1976
Ministry of Agriculture (Rural Economy)	Mykhailo Khoronzhyi	February 1976	January 1985
Ministry of Agriculture (Rural Economy)	Oleksandr Tkachenko	January 1985	November 1985
State Committee of Agro-Industrial Economy	Yuriy Kolomiets	November 1985	October 1989
State Committee of Agro-Industrial Economy	???	October 1989	July 1990
State Committee of Agro-Industrial Economy	Mykola Sydorenko	July 1990	August 1991

=== Transitional period ===
On 21 May 1991 Oleksandr Tkachenko was appointed as a State Minister on issues of Agrarian Policy and Food – Minister of Agrarian (Rural) Business of Ukraine (until 24 August 1991 Ukrainian Soviet Socialist Republic).

Name of institution	Name of minister	Term of office	
Name of institution	Name of minister	Start	End
State Committee of Agro-Industrial Economy	Oleksandr Tkachenko	May 1991	February 1992

=== Ukraine ===
Name of ministry	Name of minister	Term of office	
Name of ministry	Name of minister	Start	End
Ministry of Agriculture (Rural Economy) and Food	Vasyl Tkachuk	February 1992	December 1992
Ministry of Agriculture (Rural Economy) and Food	Yuriy Karasyk	December 1992	August 1995
Ministry of Agriculture (Rural Economy) and Food	Pavlo Haidutskyi	August 1995	June 1996
Ministry of Agriculture (Rural Economy) and Food	Anatoliy Khorishko	June 1996	February 1997
Ministry of Agriculture (Rural Economy) and Food	Mykhailo Zubets	February 1997	July 1997
Ministry of Agriculture (Rural Economy) and Food	Yuriy Karasyk	July 1997	April 1998
Ministry of Agro-Industrial Policy	Borys Supikhanov	April 1998	July 1999
Ministry of Agro-Industrial Policy	Mykhailo Hladiy	July 1999	January 2000
Ministry of Agrarian Policy	Ivan Kyrylenko	January 2000	April 2002
Ministry of Agrarian Policy	Serhiy Ryzhuk	April 2002	January 2004
Ministry of Agrarian Policy	Viktor Slauta	January 2004	December 2004
Ministry of Agrarian Policy	???	December 2004	February 2005
Ministry of Agrarian Policy	Oleksandr Baranivskyi	February 2005	August 2006
Ministry of Agrarian Policy	Yuriy Melnyk	August 2006	March 2010
Ministry of Agrarian Policy	Mykola Prysyazhnyuk	March 2010	December 2010
Ministry of Agrarian Policy and Food	Mykola Prysyazhnyuk	December 2010	February 2014
Ministry of Agrarian Policy and Food	Ihor Shvaika	February 2014	December 2014
Ministry of Agrarian Policy and Food	Oleksiy Pavlenko	December 2014	April 2016
Ministry of Agrarian Policy and Food	Taras Kutovyi	April 2016	November 2018
Ministry of Agrarian Policy and Food	Maksym Martynyuk (acting)	7 December 2018	29 August 2019
Functions taken over by the Ministry of Economic Development, Trade and Agriculture from 29 August 2019 until 17 December 2020 • Directorate of Agrarian Development; • Directorate of Agro-Industrial Development • Department of Agrarian Policy
Ministry of Agrarian Policy	Roman Leshchenko	17 December 2020	24 March 2022
Ministry of Agrarian Policy	Mykola Solskyi	24 March 2022	9 May 2024
Ministry of Agrarian Policy	Taras Vysotskyi (acting)	14 May 2024	5 September 2024
Ministry of Agrarian Policy	Vitaliy Koval	5 September 2024	17 July 2025
Functions taken over by the Ministry of Economy from 17 July 2025 until 16 July 2026.
Ministry of Agrarian Policy	Taras Vysotskyi	16 July 2026	Incumbent

== See also ==
- Ukrainian production-technological support of agriculture
- Agrarian Fund
- Grain elevators companies
- Precision agriculture companies
