= Lutuhyne =

City in Luhansk Oblast, Ukraine

Lutuhyne Лутугине
- City
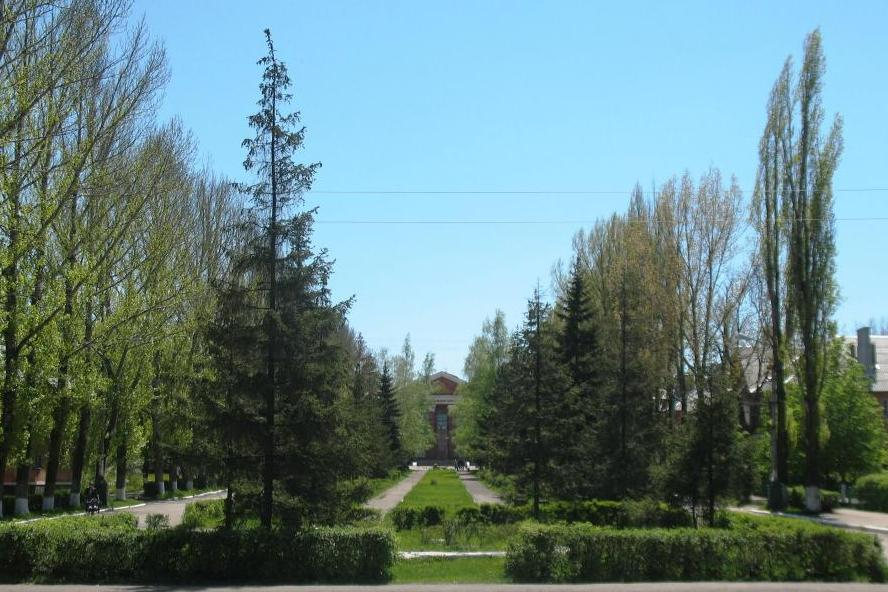
- Boulevard

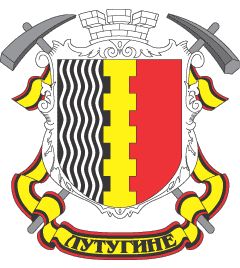
- Flag Coat of arms
- Interactive map of Lutuhyne
- Location within Luhansk Oblast Location within Ukraine
- Coordinates: 48.4019°N 39.2103°E
- Country: Ukraine
- Oblast: Luhansk Oblast
- Raion: Luhansk Raion
- Hromada: Lutuhyne urban hromada

Population (2022)
  - Total: 17,061
- Area code: (+380)
- Vehicle registration: BB / 13
- Climate: Dfa

Lutuhyne (Ukrainian: Лутугине; Russian: Лутугино) is a city in the Luhansk Raion of Luhansk Oblast (region) of Eastern Ukraine, Donbas. Residence of Lutuhyne urban hromada. The 2022 population was 17,061 (2022 estimate).

== History ==
During the Ukrainian War of Independence, from 1917 to 1920, it passed between various factions. Afterwards, it was administratively part of the Donets Governorate of Ukraine.

From mid-April 2014 pro-Russian separatists captured several towns in Luhansk Oblast, including Lutuhyne. On 27 July 2014, Ukrainian forces claimed their troops had entered the city, and would restore Ukrainian control, yet by autumn it was clear that Lutuhyne was under the control of the pro-Russian, self-declared Lugansk People's Republic, and would remain that way from autumn 2014 on. After the start of Russia's full-scale invasion of Ukraine, the city became the scene of significant pro-Ukrainian partisan warfare. Following the highly disputed 2022 annexation referendums in Russian-occupied Ukraine, Russia has claimed the settlement as their territory.

== Demographics ==
Ethnic composition and native language as of the Ukrainian Census of 2001:

Ethnic groups in Lutuhyne
	percent
Ukrainians	66.63%
Russians	31.00%
Belarusians	0.70%
Armenians	0.41%

Native languages in Lutuhyne
	percent
Russian	56.93%
Ukrainian	42.35%
Armenian	0.26%
Belarusian	0.06%

== Gallery ==
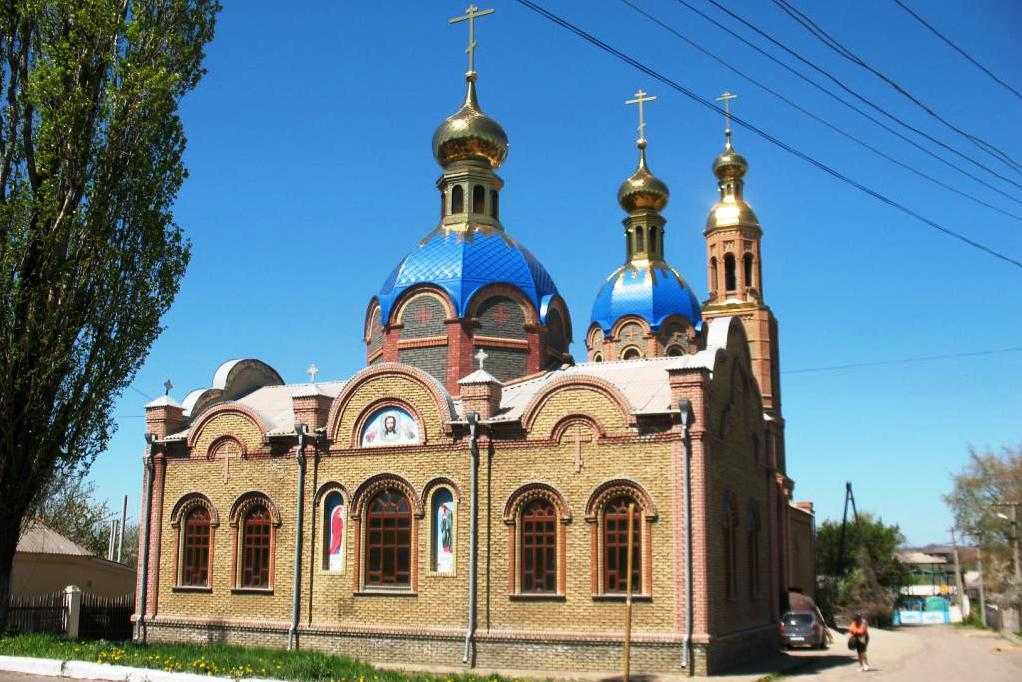
Lutuhyne church

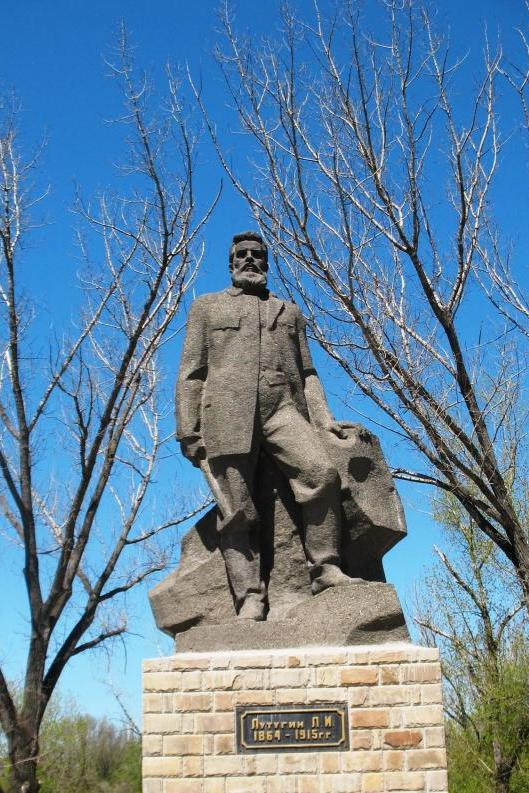
Monument to L. I. Lutugin, founder of the city

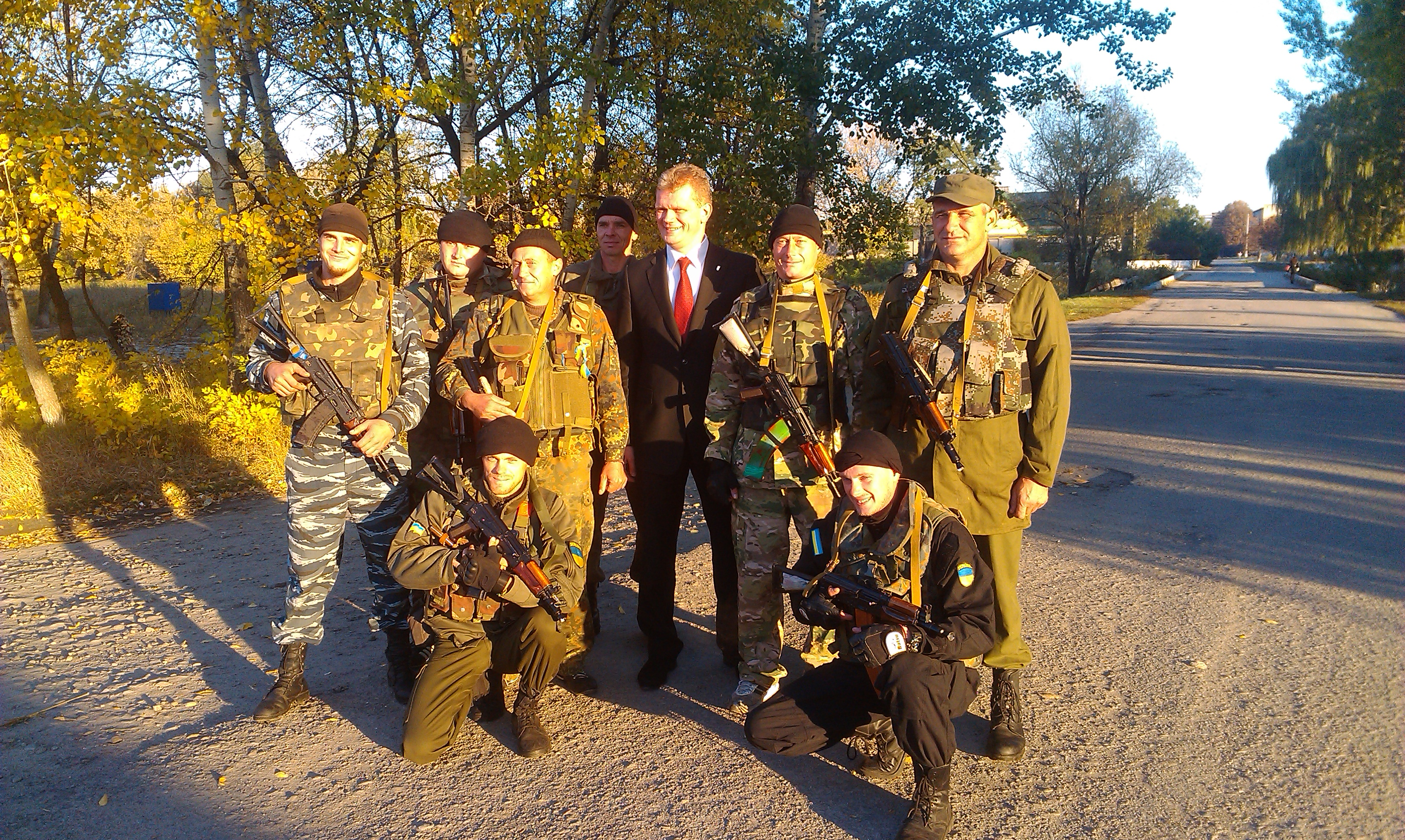
Ihor Shvaika with pro-Ukrainian volunteers from Lutuhyne during the War in Donbas

== Notable people ==
- Serhiy Puchkov (born 1962), Ukrainian football player and manager
- Ihor Shvaika (born 1976), Ukrainian politician (Svoboda)
