= Embassy of Syria, Kyiv =

Embassy of Syria, Kyiv Ukrainian: Посольство Сирії в Україні Arabic: سفارة سوريا في أوكرانيا
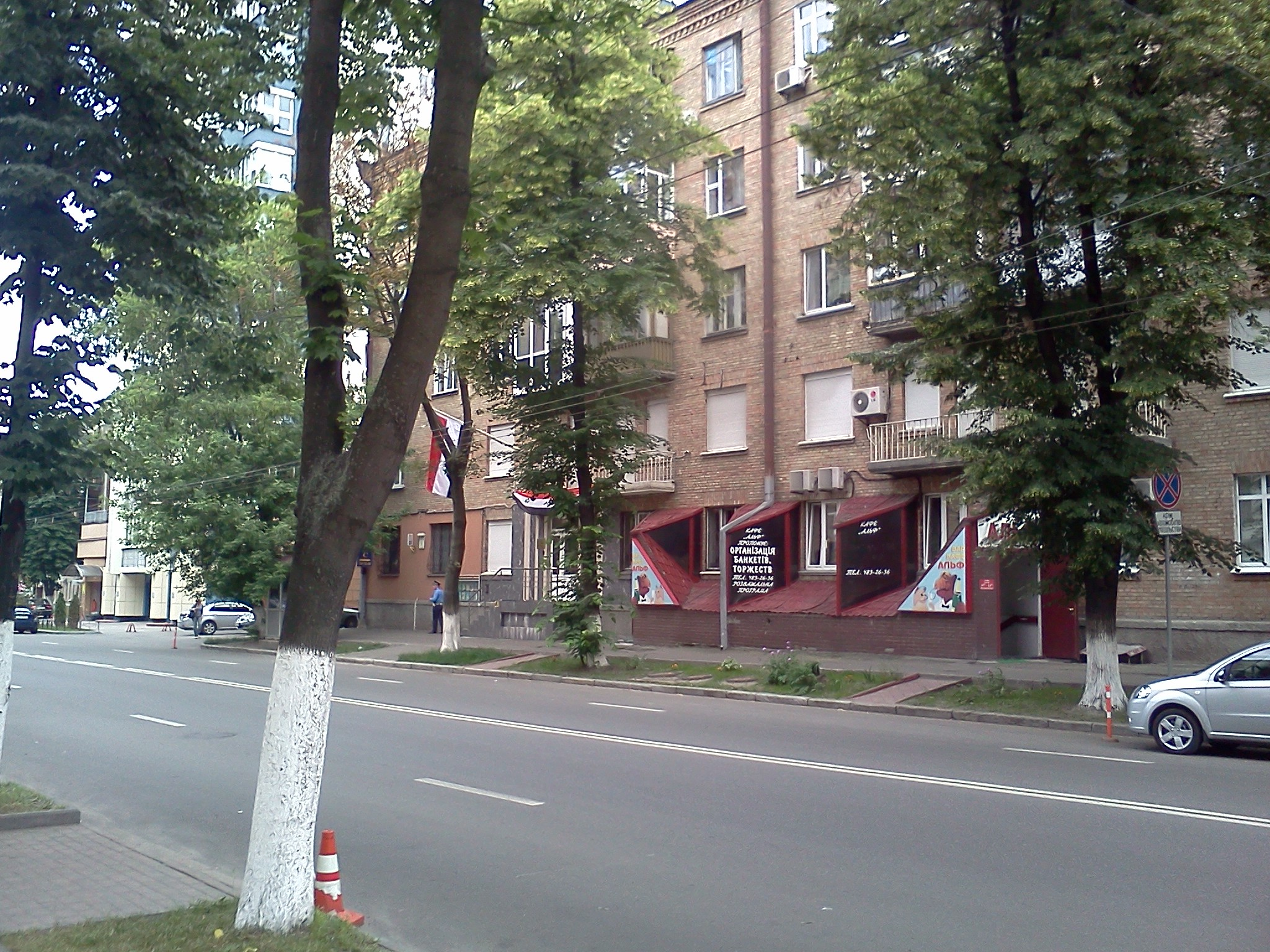
- View of the embassy in 2012
- Location: Kyiv, Ukraine
- Address: 5 Beloruska St., Kyiv
- Coordinates: 50°27′47″N 30°28′40″E
- Opened: April 25, 2005; TBD (as of Dec. 2024)
- Closed: 2018

Embassy of Syria, Kyiv (Ukrainian: Посольство Сирії в Україні; Arabic: سفارة سوريا في أوكرانيا) is the official diplomatic mission of the Syrian Arab Republic in Ukraine.

== History ==
In December 1991, the Syrian Arab Republic recognized Ukraine following its declaration of independence, and diplomatic relations were established on March 31, 1992.

In connection with the Assad regime's war crimes during the Syrian Civil War, the Ukrainian government decided to close its embassy in Damascus, and also forced this embassy in Kyiv to close by 2018.

On June 30, 2022, after Ba'athist Syria recognized the Luhansk and Donetsk People's Republic as independent states, Ukraine announced that it is severing ties with Syria, and imposed economic sanctions on related groups and individuals in Syria.

On December 30, 2024, following the fall of the Assad regime, the Minister of Foreign Affairs of Ukraine, Andrii Sybiha, and the de facto leader of Syria, Ahmed al-Sharaa, met in Damascus, where they discussed ways to restore bilateral relations between Ukraine and Syria.

== See also ==
- Syria–Ukraine relations
- Embassy of Ukraine, Damascus
- List of diplomatic missions of Syria
- List of diplomatic missions in Ukraine
