= Embassy of Ukraine, Damascus =

Embassy of Ukraine, Damascus Ukrainian: Посольство України в Сирії Arabic: سفارة أوكرانيا في سوريا
- Location: Damascus, Syria
- Address: 14 as-Salam St., East Mezzeh, Damascus
- Opened: February 2000 (1st); TBD (2nd)
- Closed: 2016
- Ambassador: Vacant, Tamer Al-Tounsi (Honorary Consul)

Embassy of Ukraine, Damascus (Ukrainian: Посольство України в Сирії; Arabic: سفارة أوكرانيا في سوريا) is the official diplomatic mission of Ukraine in the Syrian Arab Republic.

== History ==
In December 1991, the Syrian Arab Republic recognized Ukraine following its declaration of independence, and diplomatic relations were established on March 31, 1992. In 1993, the Verkhovna Rada adopted a decision to open an embassy in Syria, which began operations by February 2000. In April 2005, Syria also opened an embassy in Kyiv.

In connection with the Assad regime's war crimes during the Syrian civil war, the Ukrainian government decided to close this embassy, as well as the Syrian embassy in Kyiv in 2018. Since 2016, the services are provided to Ukrainian nationals through the Ukrainian embassy in Beirut.

On June 30, 2022, after Ba'athist Syria recognized the Luhansk and Donetsk People's Republic as independent states, Ukraine announced that it is severing ties with Syria, and imposed economic sanctions on related groups and individuals in Syria.

On December 30, 2024, following the fall of the Assad regime, the Minister of Foreign Affairs of Ukraine, Andrii Sybiha, and the de facto leader of Syria, Ahmed al-Sharaa, met in Damascus, where they discussed ways to restore bilateral relations between Ukraine and Syria. Tamer Al-Tounsi, a Ukrainian-Syrian entrepreneur, was appointed as Ukraine's Honorary Consul in Syria at a ceremony later that day.

== Heads of the diplomatic mission ==
List of the heads of the Ukrainian diplomatic mission to Syria
Position	Name	Start	End
Charge d'Affaires	Serhiy Alekseevich Kamyshev	1998	1999
Ambassador	Yevhen Mykytenko	1999	2002
Ambassador	Volodymyr Oleksandrovych Koval	2002	2006
Ambassador	Semenets Oleg Yevhenovych	2008	2011
Temporary Attorney	Zhupeev Yevgeny Igorovich	2011	2014
Temporary Attorney	Dzhidzhora Volodymyr Grigorovich	2014	2017

== See also ==
- Syria–Ukraine relations
- Embassy of Syria, Kyiv
- List of diplomatic missions of Ukraine
- List of diplomatic missions in Syria
