= Taras Kutovy =

Ukrainian politician (1976–2019)

- Тарас Кутовий
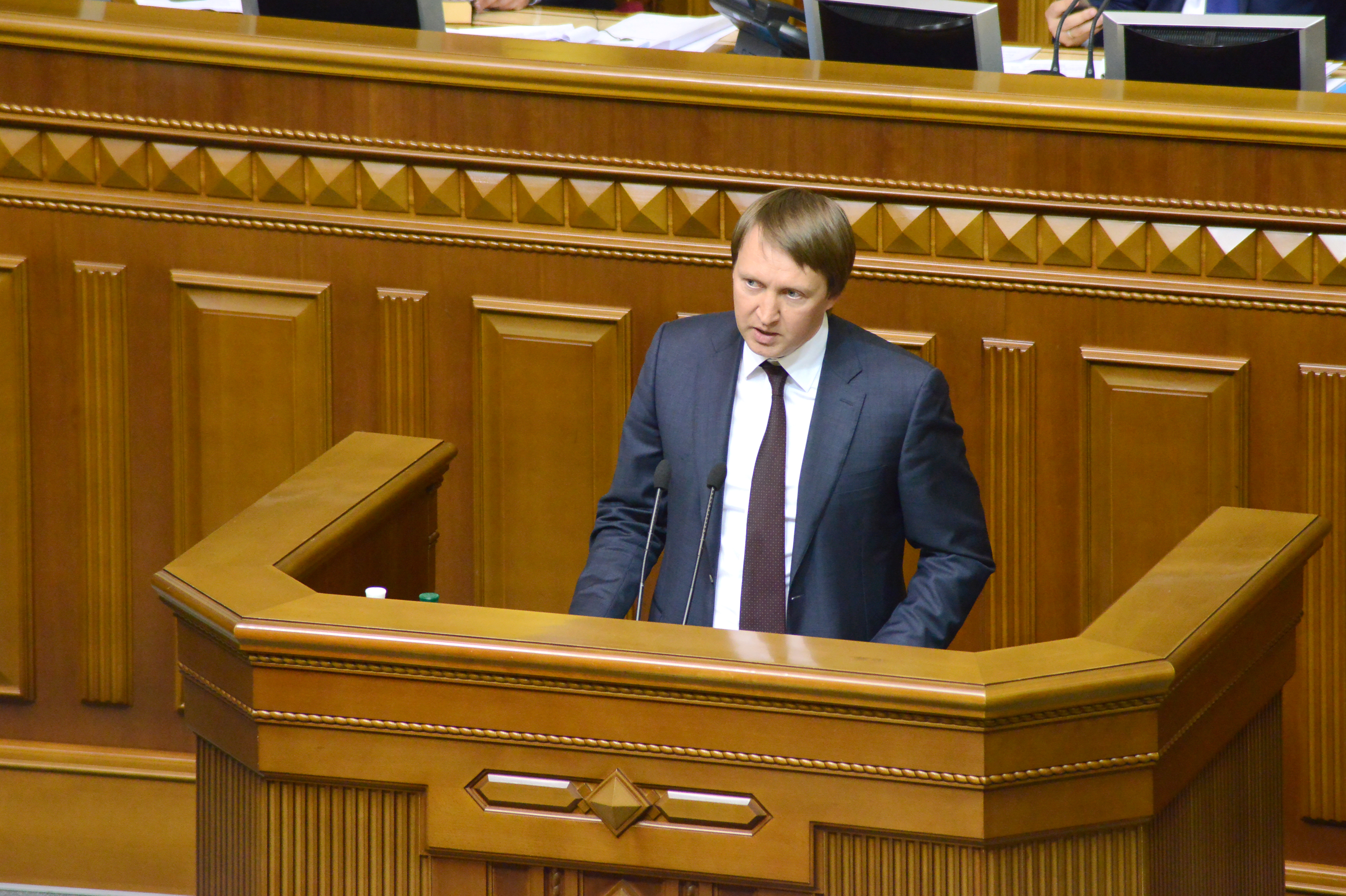
- Kutovy in 2015

Minister of Agrarian Policy and Food of Ukraine
- In office 14 April 2016 – 22 November 2018
- Prime Minister: Volodymyr Groysman
- Preceded by: Oleksiy Pavlenko
- Succeeded by: Maxim Martynyuk (acting)

People's Deputy of Ukraine
- In office 12 December 2012 – 2 December 2014
- Preceded by: Constituency established
- Succeeded by: Ruslan Bogdan
- Constituency: Poltava Oblast, No. 151

Personal details
- Born: 25 February 1976 Kyiv, Ukrainian SSR, Soviet Union (now Ukraine)
- Died: 21 October 2019 (aged 43) Poltava Oblast, Ukraine
- Party: Petro Poroshenko Bloc
- Other political affiliations: Ukrainian Democratic Alliance for Reform
- Education: National Academy of the Security Service of Ukraine (1997); Kyiv National Economic University (1998); International Management Institute Kyiv (2002)
- Occupation: Economist, statesman

Taras Viktorovych Kutovy (Ukrainian: Тарас Вікторович Кутовий; 25 February 1976 – 21 October 2019) was a Ukrainian economist and politician who served as Minister of Agrarian Policy and Food from 2016 to 2018. He previously served as a People's Deputy of Ukraine from 2012 to 2014, representing Ukraine's 151st electoral district in northern Poltava Oblast.

== Biography ==
Kutovy was first elected to the Verkhovna Rada (Ukrainian parliament) in 2012 Ukrainian parliamentary election, as the Ukrainian Democratic Alliance for Reform candidate in Ukraine's 151st electoral district. He was re-elected in the 2014 Ukrainian parliamentary election, this time as part of the Petro Poroshenko Bloc.

On 14 April 2016, he was appointed minister of agrarian policy and food of Ukraine in the Groysman government. On 23 May 2017, he announced that he wanted to resign from this position to pursue a career in the private sector and requested lawmakers to approve his resignation. On 22 November 2018, the parliament approved his resignation. Kutovy died in a helicopter crash near the village of Tarasenkove in Ukraine's Poltava Oblast on 21 October 2019 at the age of 43. Kutovyi was piloting the helicopter and was the only person on board, according to the State Emergency Service.

Political offices
Preceded by Oleksiy Pavlenko	Minister of Agrarian Policy and Food; 2016-2018	Succeeded by Maksym Martynyuk (acting)
