= Oleksandr Koval (politician) =

Ukrainian politician (born 1987)

- Олександр Коваль

Governor of Rivne Oblast
- Incumbent
- Assumed office 27 December 2023
- Preceded by: Serhiy Podolin (Acting)

Head of the Rivne District State Administration
- In office 5 March 2021 – 27 December 2023

First Deputy Mayor of Kostopil City Council
- In office December 2020 – 5 March 2021

Head of the Kotsopil District State Administration
- In office 28 November 2019 – 23 November 2020

Personal details
- Born: Oleksandr Serhiyovych Koval; 12 October 1987 (age 38) Kostopil, Ukrainian SSR, Soviet Union

Oleksandr Serhiyovych Koval (Ukrainian: Олександр Сергійович Коваль; born 12 October 1987) is a Ukrainian statesman, who is currently the Governor of Rivne Oblast since 27 December 2023.

== Biography ==
Koval was born on 12 October 1987. In 2004, he graduated from the Kostopil secondary school—complex I-III degrees No. 6 of the Rivne Oblast. From 2004 to 2009, Koval was a student of the National University of Water Management and Nature Management, majoring in Ecology and Environmental Protection.

On 28 November 2019, he became the head of the Kostopil district state administration of the Rivne region.

On 23 November 2020, he was relived of his duties as in December he became the first deputy mayor of the Kostopil City Council.

On 5 March 2021, he became the head of the Rivne district state administration within the Rivne Oblast.

On 27 December 2023, Koval became the Governor of Rivne Oblast.
