= NAASU Institute of Fisheries =

National scientific institution of Ukraine

Ukrainian Institute of Fisheries of the National Academy of Agrarian Sciences
- Інститут рибного господарства НААН України
- Founded: 1930
- Location: Kyiv, Ukraine
- Website: if.org.ua

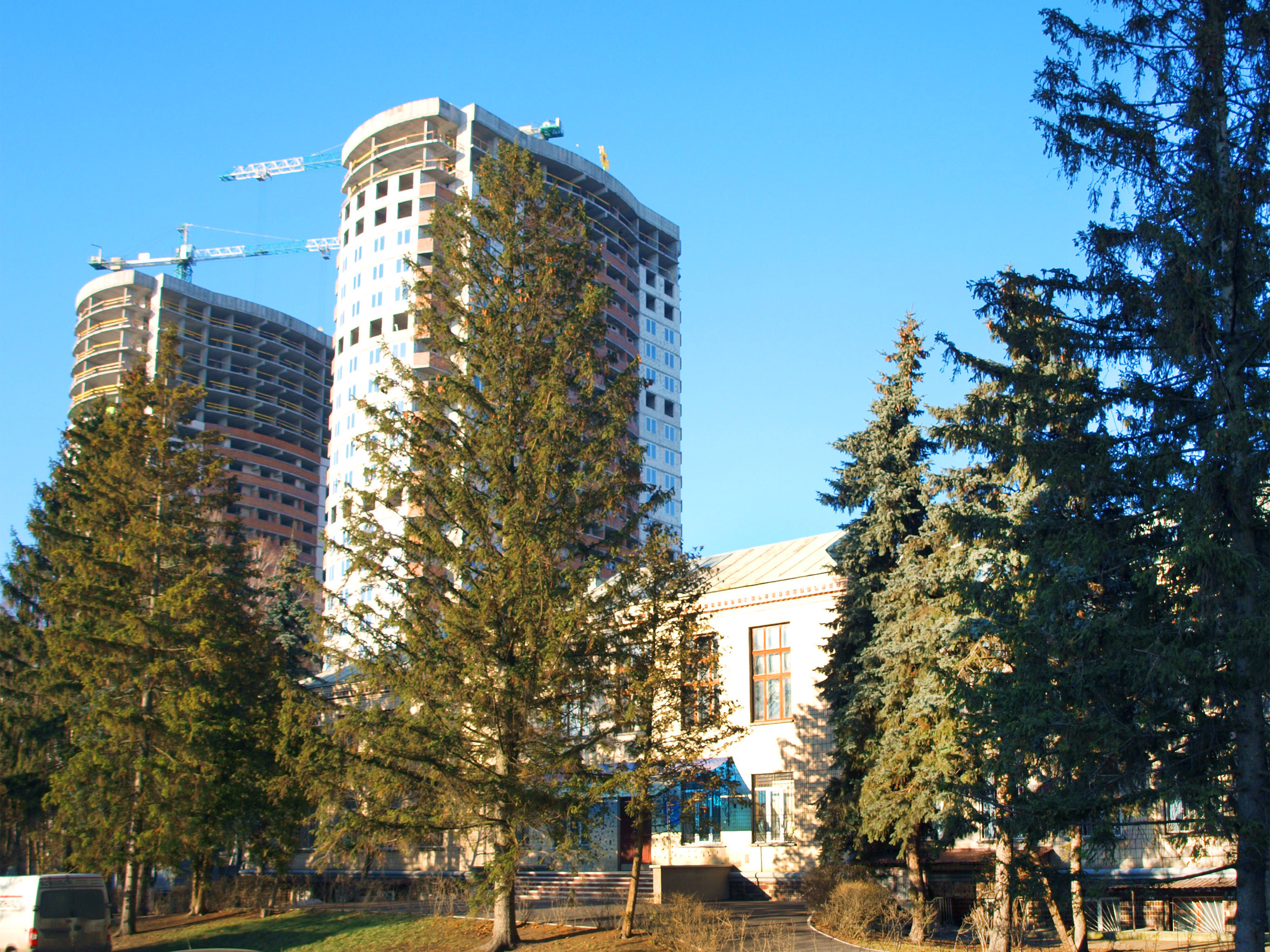
Institute of Fisheries

The Ukrainian Institute of Fisheries of the National Academy of Agrarian Sciences is a scientific institution focused on fisheries research located in Kyiv, Ukraine.

== History ==
The Institute was established in 1930 from the Kyiv research fisheries station. Since that time, its name was changed from "Kyiv Research Institute of pond and lake and river fisheries" (1944), in "Ukrainian Research Institute of Fisheries" (URIF – 1945) and "Ukrainian Scientific-Production Association Pisciculture and Fisheries" (UkrSPO for Pisciculture and Fisheries – 1986), and in 1992 it received its current name.

== Director ==
The institute's director is Ihor Hrytsyniak, a doctor of agricultural sciences, professor, and academician of the National Academy of Agrarian Sciences of Ukraine.

Hrytsyniak is a member of the Director council on international cooperation of the Network of Scientific Aquaculture Centers in Eastern-Central Europe (NACEE).

He is the editor-in-chief of the scientific journal Fisheries Science of Ukraine published in Ukraine since 2007.

== Departments ==
The structure of the scientific units of the Institute of Fisheries:

- Department of the study of reservoirs' bioresources
- Department of fish selection
- Department of molecular-genetic studies with laboratory
- Department of ichthyopathology
- Department of fish feeds and feeding
- Department of international scientific and technical cooperation and intellectual property
- Department of pond aquaculture and hydrobiont ecology
- Laboratory of management in aquaculture
- Laboratory of bioindication and biochemical studies
- Laboratory of biotechnologies in aquaculture
- Laboratory of ecological studies
- Laboratory of hydrobiology and technology of the cultivation of valuable invertebrates
- Laboratory of salmonid culture and restoration of endangered fish species
- Sturgeon culture sector
- Postgraduate and doctoral studies

== International cooperation ==
Institute scientists cooperate with more than thirty scientific institutions in 17 countries of Europe, Asia, and America. The main line is to solve the problems of aquatic bioresources and aquaculture. Internship programs for young scientists and training in new methods and techniques of research, selection, molecular-genetic and biochemical studies are developed with research institutions of Poland, Hungary, USA, Russian Federation and Belarus.

In 1997, the institute was the initiator for creating the International Council of scientific and technical cooperation in the field of aquatic bioresources of inland water bodies, which included 16 scientific institutions of Belarus, Kazakhstan, Moldova, Russian Federation, Poland, Hungary and Ukraine. The cooperation worked as bilateral and multilateral studies in the field of selection in aquaculture, conservation and restoration of valuable and endangered fish species, development of resource saving technologies of fish rearing, fisheries exploitation of reservoirs and cooling water bodies of energetic systems, fish feeding, and prevention of fish diseases.

In 2004, the International Council was transformed into the Network of Aquaculture Centers in Central-Eastern Europe (NACEE), the main mandate of which was to coordinate research and development works in the field of aquatic bioresources and aquaculture in this region. The Institute of Fisheries is an associate contractor on research topics including carp selection, sturgeon culture and conservation of aquatic bioresources. The Institute participates in the project "Technological platform of aquaculture development in Central and Eastern Europe with the possibility of further integration into a common European scientific space". The Institute is also a member of the European Aquaculture Association, with which it cooperates in fisheries science.

== Scientific library ==
The Institute's library is a specialized scientific-subdivision, which carries out bibliographic and library support. The library has a specialized stock of scientific literature on aquaculture, inland fisheries, ichthyology, hydroecology, hydrobiology, general biology, zoology, hydrotechnics and aquaculture economy. The thorough use of the library stock is facilitated by the reference-bibliographic tool composed of catalogues and file-cabinets. The card variant has alphabetical and systematic catalogues, which include Institute reports, periodic journals, dissertations and dissertation abstracts, articles of the Institute employees (partially). The IRBIS electronic catalogue includes monographs, collections of scientific articles, articles from periodicals and other publications. The scientific library stock is composed of about 50 000 items and contains all types of print publications. The library provides information and library-bibliographic services to scientists, specialists, postgraduate students and students of higher education institutions. Reader services are performed through subscription, in the reading room and through an inter-library exchange system.

== Fisheries Science of Ukraine ==
It is represented in databases such as Directory of Open Access Journals (DOAJ), DOI (the Digital Object Identifier), Ulrich's Periodicals Directory, Open Academic Journals Index (OAJI) eLIBRARY.RU, ROAD – каталог наукових ресурсів відкритого доступу, Google Scholar and «Українські Наукові Журнали».
