= Central Union of Consumer Associations of Ukraine =

Ukrainian non-profit organisation

Coordinates: 50.450673°N 30.525835°E

Ukoopspilka
- Central Union of Consumer Associations of Ukraine
- Центральна спілка споживчих товариств України
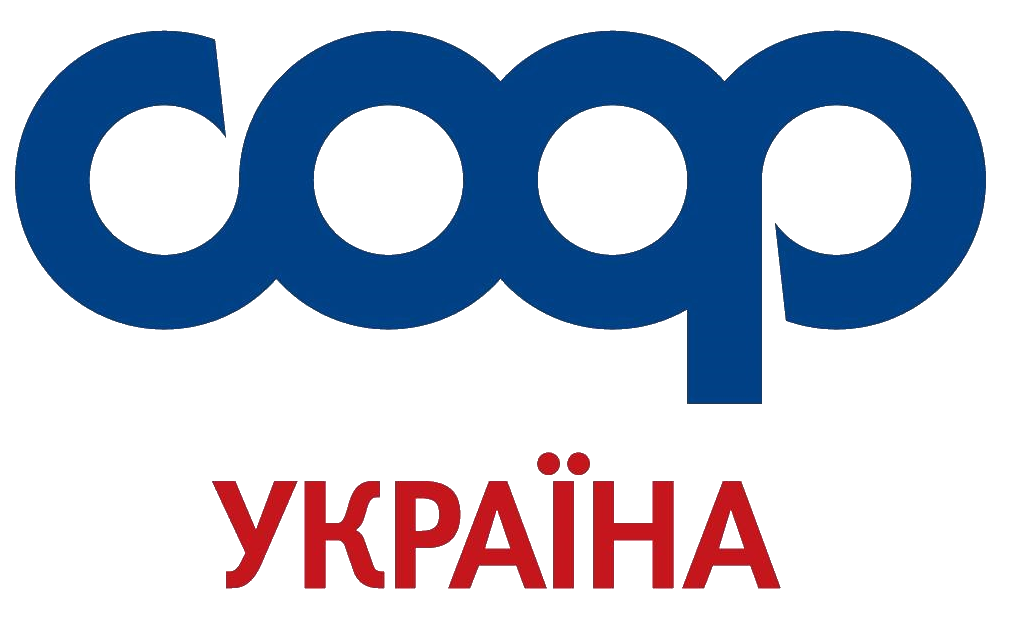
- Founded: 1920
- Headquarters: vul. Khreshchatyk, 7/11, Kyiv, Ukraine
- Location: Ukraine
- Key people: Yuriy Kulyk (President)
- Affiliations: International Co-operative Alliance
- Website: www.coop.ua

Central Union of Consumer Associations of Ukraine (Ukoopspilka) (Ukrainian: Центральна спілка споживчих товариств України (Укоопспілка), romanized: Tsentralʹna spilka spozhyvchykh tovarystv Ukrayiny) is a non-profit organization of Ukraine that serves as a representative and protects interests of consumer associations, societies and their members in respective state and international organizations. The Union is responsible for activities of cooperation movement members and development as well as promotion of cooperation ideas. The organization was initially created on June 7, 1920. Eventually it was integrated into the Centrosoyuz of the USSR and on June 17, 1992, it was reestablished once again.

== See also ==
- Federation of Trade Unions of Ukraine
- List of co-operative federations
- Ukrainian cooperative movement
