= Dashynka =

Village in Zhytomyr Oblast, Ukraine

Dashynka Дашинка
- Location in Zhytomyr Oblast Dashynka (Ukraine)
- Coordinates: 50°38′58″N 28°23′42″E
- Country: Ukraine
- Oblast: Zhytomyr Oblast
- Raion: Zhytomyr Raion
- Village founded: 1890

Area
  - Total: 1,557 km^{2} (601 sq mi)
- Elevation: 197 m (646 ft)

Population (2001)
  - Total: 389
  - Density: 24,984/km^{2} (64,710/sq mi)
- Time zone: UTC+2 (EET)
  - Summer (DST): UTC+3 (EEST)
- Postal code: 12124
- Area code: +380 4145

Dashynka (Ukrainian: Да́шинка; Polish: Dászynka) is a village in Zhytomyr Raion of Zhytomyr Oblast of Ukraine.

== Geography ==
Dashynka is within the boundaries of the natural-geographical region Polissya and 6 km from the district center – the city Khoroshiv. The nearest train station – New Borovaya (station), for 24 km. To the south-east of the village flows the river Irshitsya.

== History ==
Dashynka was founded in the second half of the XVII century. In 1906, the village lived 463 people, there were 86 yard farms. In 1932–1933, the village suffered from the Holodomor. According to eyewitnesses, the number of deaths was at least 20 people. During the German-Soviet war, 211 local residents took part in hostilities, 121 of them died, 90 were awarded with orders and medals. In the early 1970s, the central estate of the Zhdanov collective farm, an eight-year school, a club, a library with a book fund of 6759 copies and a paramedic-obstetric station operated in the village.

== Population ==
According to Population Census of Ukraine 2001, the population of the village was 389 people, of which 99.74% said their native Ukrainian, and 0.26% – Belarusian

== Famous people from Dashynka ==
- Olexandr Germanovych Pap
- Ovsiy Grygorovych Levchenko

== Sources and external links ==
Media related to Dashynka at Wikimedia Commons

- Registration card on the site of Verkhovna Rada of Ukraine
- Web-page of KHOROSHIV COMMUNITY
