= State Agency of Fisheries of Ukraine =

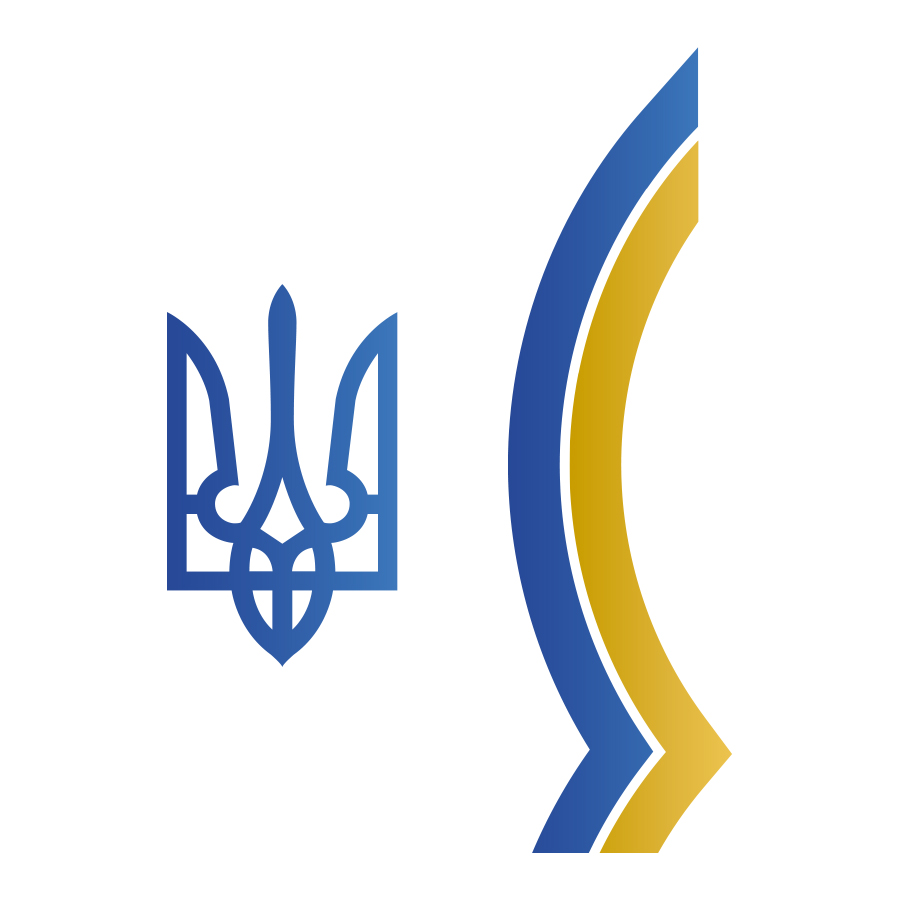
State Agency for Fisheries of Ukraine Emblem

The State Agency for Fisheries was established to implement state policy in the fishing industry of Ukraine. From 1994 to 1997 it served as a governmental ministry in the Cabinet of Ukraine.

== Remit ==
It supervises the protection, use and reproduction of aquatic biological resources, the regulation of fisheries, maritime safety of fishing fleet vessels and to addresses cases established by Ukrainian legislation on the territory of Ukraine in the Exclusive (maritime) Economic Zone and on its continental shelf, as well as in the exclusive economic zones of other states and in open ocean areas that are under the jurisdiction of international organizations on fisheries management, as well as in those that are outside of any jurisdiction according to the international agreements agreed to by Ukraine.

One of its main tasks is submission of proposals concerning state policy in the fisheries field to the Minister of agrarian policy and food of Ukraine. Its activities are directed and coordinated by the Cabinet of Ministers of Ukraine through the Minister of Agrarian Policy.

== History ==
The Ministry of Fisheries was established on 30 October 1994 in order to develop and implement a unified state policy on the development of fisheries and improving management of the sector. On 25 July 1997, the State Fishery Committee of Ukraine was established, succeeding the Ministry of Fisheries of Ukraine.

On 15 March 2000, the Ukrainian government created the State Department of Fisheries within the Ministry of Agriculture.

On 2 November 2006, the State Fishery Committee of Ukraine, a central executive body, was created.

By the Decree of the Cabinet of Ministers of Ukraine on 24 January 2007 (№ 42 "On approval of teState Committee for Fisheries of Ukraine") the State Committee for Fisheries of Ukraine was established. The Decree of President Viktor Yanukovych of 16 April 2011 ("On the State Agency for Fisheries of Ukraine") established Derzhrybahentstvo of Ukraine as a central executive body, whose activities are directed and coordinated by the Cabinet of Ministers through the Minister of Agrarian Policy and Food of Ukraine.

On 8 April 2015, Yarema Kovaliv was appointed Chairman of the State Agency of Fisheries of Ukraine.

== Activities ==
In 2015, the Agency began large-scale deregulation: cancellation of 7 permitting documents, which created a basis for corruption; development of the aquaculture and mariculture; prohibition of the industrial fishing in the Dnieper river in Kyiv.

The Agency started the reformation of fish protection authorities, whose quality of work was the reason for public distrust of the department.

The Agency created a fishing patrol. In Kyiv the patrol started in December 2015. More than 2,000 profiles were received. As a result of the selection, which included four stages, 47 candidates were selected.

On 16 June, the first fisheries protection patrol started its work. During 2016–2017, the Agency announced fishing patrols in other regions of Ukraine.

== See also ==
- NAASU Institute of Fisheries
