= Mykola Prysyazhnyuk =

Ukrainian politician

- Микола Присяжнюк
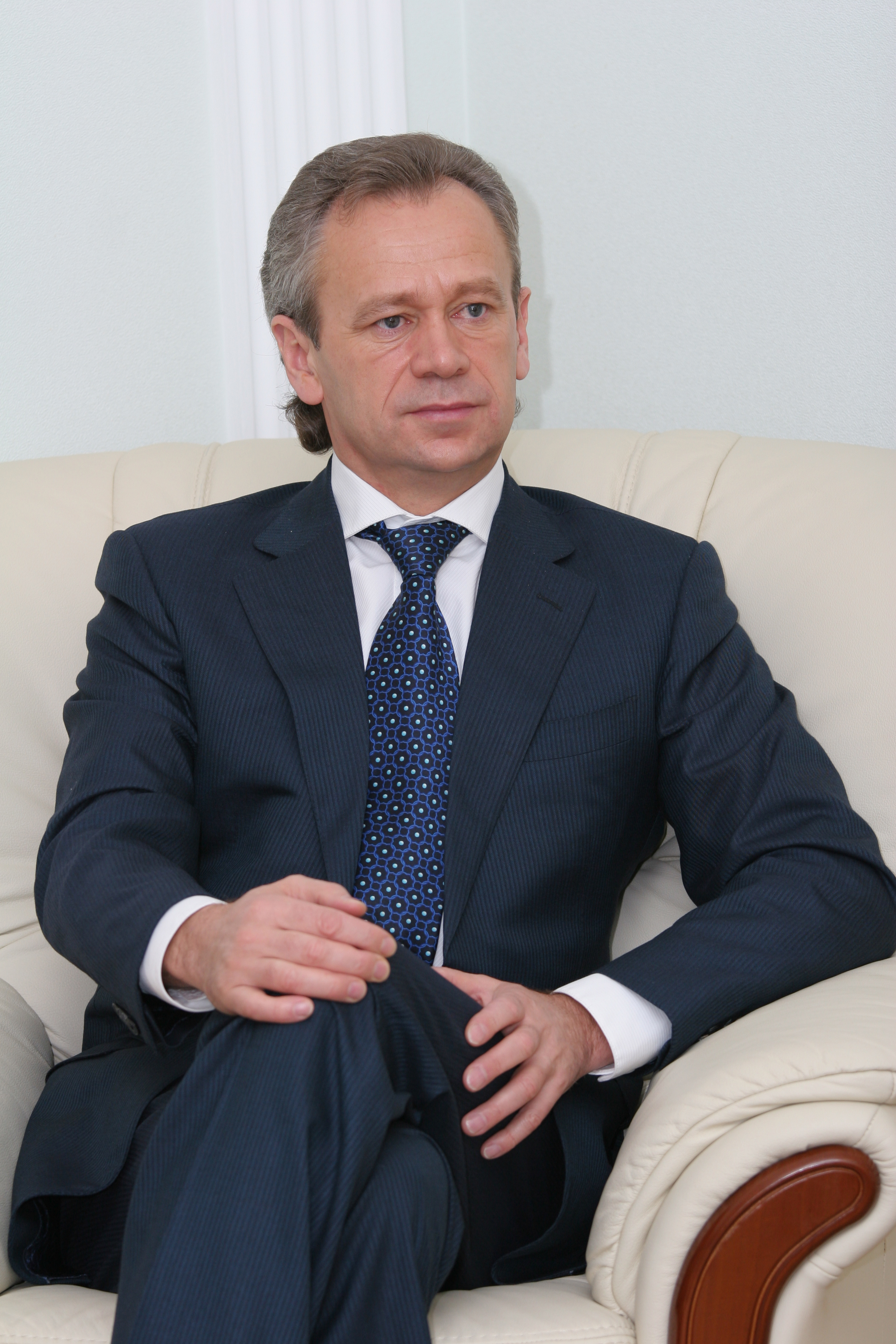
- Prysyazhnyuk in 2008

Minister of Agrarian Policy and Food of Ukraine
- In office 11 March 2010 – 27 February 2014
- Prime Minister: Mykola Azarov
- Preceded by: Yuriy Melnyk
- Succeeded by: Ihor Shvaika

Personal details
- Born: January 13, 1960 (age 66) Ksaveriv (Zhytomyr Oblast)
- Party: Party of Regions

Mykola Prysyazhnyuk (Ukrainian: Микола Володимирович Присяжнюк; born 3 January 1960) is the former Minister of Agrarian Policy and Food of Ukraine.

== Biography ==
Prysyazhnyuk graduated from Voronezh University and the Donbas Mining-Metallurgical Institute. He has worked as a diamond cutter before becoming a chief process engineer at Ordzhonikidzevugillya coal mine. In the years 2002-2005 he was the first deputy chairman of Zhytomyr Regional State Administration and in the years 2005-2007 head of the National Association of Meat and Meat Products Producers before becoming a member of the Verkhovna Rada (Ukraine's parliament) for the Party of Regions He did not participate in the 2012 Ukrainian parliamentary election and 2014 Ukrainian parliamentary election.

== Minister of Agrarian Policy ==
During his time as minister, he helped develop relations with China in the field of agriculture. The two countries considered cooperation in rural engineering, plant protection production, and the exchange of scientists. He also reached an agreement with foreign banks in Ukraine to work in cooperation with Ukrainian farmers, and in lending to domestic agricultural producers. Prysyazhnyuk also helped develop the programme "Concept of Rural Development" in order to develop the social infrastructure of rural populations and farms.

== Criminal case ==
The Prosecutor General's Office asked courts to arrest Prysyazhnyuk in early 2014 on charges of embezzlement worth more than 270 million hryvnias and they asked the court for restraint in the form of detention. On 21 March 2014, law enforcement officers seized both dollars and hryvnias from him, and Switzerland froze his bank account on 28 February. On 5 April, he was put on Interpol's wanted list. On 7 April, he was put on the wanted list of Ukraine and the Pechersk District Court of Kyiv gave permission for him to be detained. In 2017 the Prosecutor General's Office started the process of applying to the court permission to convict him in absentia.
