= Vitaliy Koval =

Ukrainian politician

- Віталій Коваль
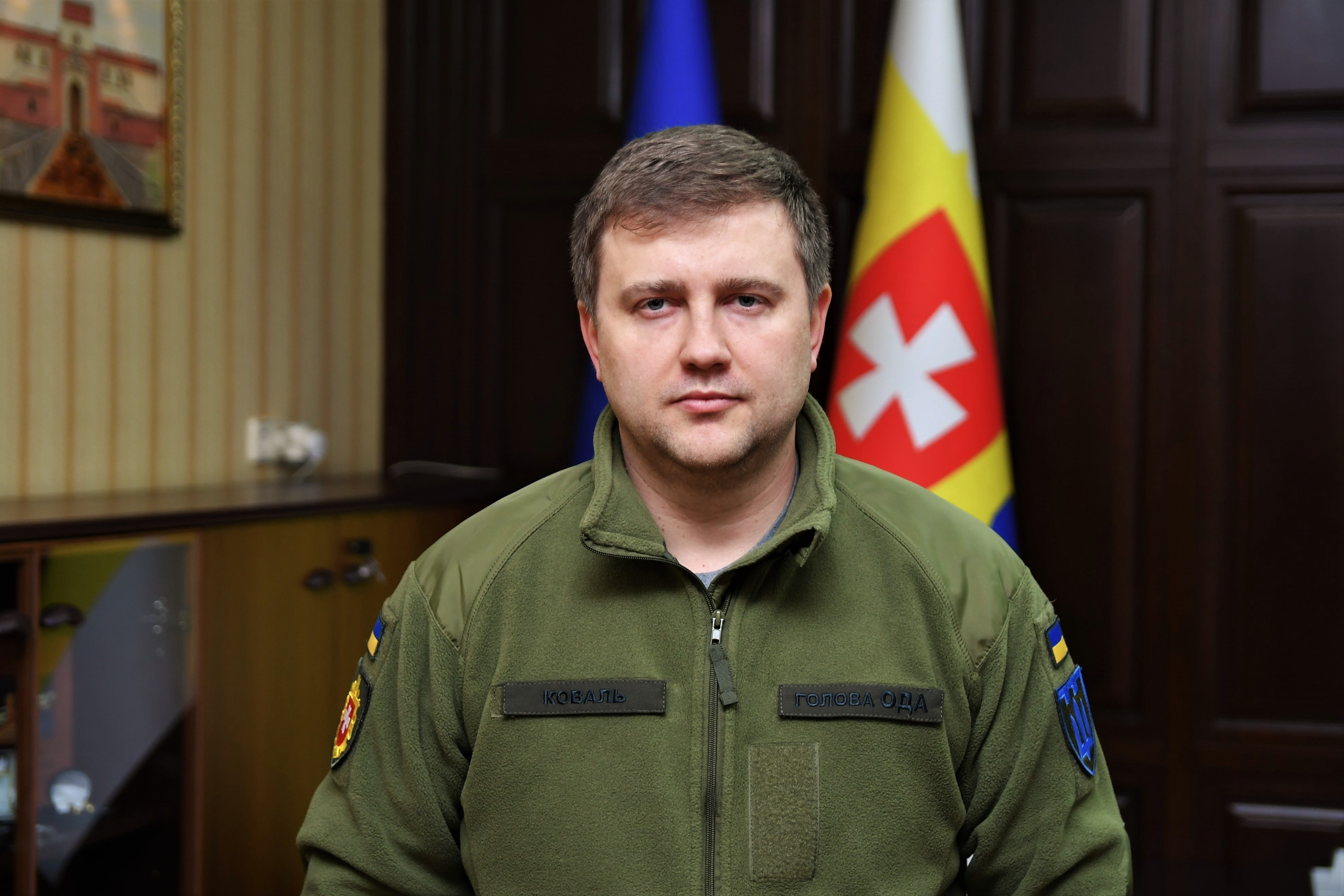
- Official portrait, 2022

Minister of Agrarian Policy and Food
- In office 5 September 2024 – 17 July 2025
- President: Volodymyr Zelenskyy
- Prime Minister: Denys Shmyhal
- Preceded by: Taras Vysotskyi (acting)
- Succeeded by: Merged into the Ministry of Economy

Governor of Rivne Oblast
- In office 9 September 2019 – 22 November 2023
- Preceded by: Ihor Tymoshenko
- Succeeded by: Serhiy Podolin (acting)

Personal details
- Born: Vitaliy Stanislavovych Koval; 28 July 1981 (age 45) Berezne, Rivne Oblast, Ukrainian SSR, Soviet Union
- Education: Ternopil National Economic University; Ukrainian Catholic University
- Occupation: entrepreneur politician

Vitaliy Stanislavovych Koval (Ukrainian: Віталій Станіславович Коваль; born 28 July 1981) is a Ukrainian entrepreneur and politician. Vice-president of the Ukrainian Wrestling Association. Member of the National Olympic Committee of Ukraine. Head of the Rivne Regional State Administration from September 9, 2019, to November 23, 2023, as Governor of Rivne Oblast.

Head of the State Property Fund of Ukraine since 21 November 2023

Koval served as Minister of Agrarian Policy and Food of Ukraine from 5 September 2024 and until the ministry's liquidation on 17 July 2025.

== Biography ==
In 2003, he graduated from Ternopil National Economic University. In 2017, received an MBA from the Lviv Business School of the Ukrainian Catholic University.

Koval worked in the banking sector (2004–2006). 2006—2019 – headed enterprises in agriculture, transport and construction.

2004–2006 – in the credit department of OJSC Ukrgasbank.

From 2008 to 2009 he was the director of Probank Consult LLC, Vyshneve (Kyiv region).

2012–2014 – General Director of Investtradeservice LLC, Kyiv.

Since 2014 – General Director of Sanako LLC (Kyiv), since 2015 – General Director of BBB Montazh (Kyiv).

Candidate for Master of Sports in Greco-Roman wrestling. He heads the public association "Rivne Regional Federation of Greco-Roman Wrestling". First Vice-president of the All-Ukrainian Federation of Greco-Roman Wrestling.

He is a member of the National Olympic Committee of Ukraine.

Vitaliy Koval is the deputy chairman of the board of the All-Ukrainian Road Association.

On September 9, 2019, Koval was appointed Governor of Rivne Oblast.

Koval has also been a candidate to be the mayor of Rivne as a member of the Servant of the People party.

On 21 November 2023 Koval was appointed Head of the State Property Fund of Ukraine. Two days later he was formally dismissed as Governor of Rivne Oblast.

Koval is married and has two daughters.
