= Viktor Slauta =

Ukrainian politician

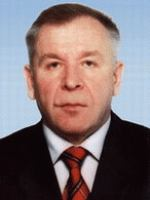
Image of Viktor Slauta

Viktor Andriyovich Slauta (Ukrainian: Віктор Андрійович Слаута; born 2 January 1952) is a Ukrainian politician who was Minister of Agrarian Policy and Food in 2004 and 2010.

== Early life ==
Slauta was born on 2 January 1952 in the village of Zakitne (Lyman Raion, which was then part of the Ukrainian SSR in the Soviet Union. In 1973, he graduated from V. Dokuchaev Kharkiv National Agrarian University with a degree in agronomy. Afterwords, he worked in a variety of collective farms, until eventually becoming Second Secretary and later Chairman of the Krasnolymansk City Committee.

He briefly returned to agriculture in the mid-1990s following the collapse of the Soviet Union, becoming general director of "Elevatorzernoprom" and director of the Donetsk office of "Bread of Ukraine".

== Political career ==
In 1988, he was appointed deputy, then later first deputy chair, of the Agro-Industrial Committee of Donetsk Oblast. He then became Head of the Agricultural Department for the Donetsk Regional State Administration and then Deputy Head of the Donetsk Regional State Administration.

He returned to politics in the 2002 Ukrainian parliamentary election on the list of For United Ukraine!. At the time, he was Deputy Governor of Donetsk Oblast. In 2004, he was appointed Minister of Agrarian Policy and Food by Viktor Yanukovych, which he did until he was dismissed in 2005. He was re-elected to the Verkhovna Rada in 2006 and later in 2007 for the Party of Regions, serving until 2010. During those elections, he served as Deputy Prime Minister for the Agro‑Industrial Complex and briefly Vice Prime Minister of Ukraine.

Following the end of his tenure in the Verkhovna Rada, he served as an advisor to the then President of Ukraine, Yanukovych, until his dismissal following Euromaidan. Since then, he has been President of the Ukrainian National Technology Platform "AGRO-FOOD".
