= 2013 in Ukraine =

- Decades: 1990s; 2000s; 2010s; 2020s
- See also: History of Ukraine; List of years in Ukraine

Events from the year 2013 in Ukraine.

== Incumbents ==
- President: Viktor Yanukovych
- Prime Minister: Mykola Azarov

=== Governors ===
- Cherkasy Oblast: Serhiy Tulub (PR)
- Chernihiv Oblast: Volodymyr Khomenko (PR)
- Chernivtsi Oblast: Mykhailo Papiev (PR)
- Dnipropetrovsk Oblast: Dmytro Kolesnikov (PR)
- Donetsk Oblast: Andriy Shyshatskyy (PR)
- Ivano-Frankivsk Oblast: Mykhailo Vyshyvanyuk (until November 8, Independent), Vasyl Chudnov (starting November 8, PR)
- Kharkiv Oblast: Mykhailo Dobkin (PR)
- Kherson Oblast: Mykola Kostyak (PR)
- Khmelnytskyi Oblast: Vasyl Yadukha (PR)
- Kirovohrad Oblast: Serhiy Larin (until January 9, PR), Andriy Nikolaienko (starting January 9, PR)
- Kyiv Oblast: Anatoliy Prysyazhnyuk (PR)
- Luhansk Oblast: Volodymyr Prystiuk (PR)
- Lviv Oblast: Mykhailo Kostyuk (until March 4, Independent), Viktor Shemchuk (March 4–October 31, Independent), Oleh Salo (starting October 31, Independent / PR ally)
- Mykolaiv Oblast: Mykola Kruhlov (PR)
- Odesa Oblast: Eduard Matviychuk (until November 8, PR), Mykola Skoryk (starting November 8, PR)
- Poltava Oblast: Oleksandr Udovichenko (PR)
- Rivne Oblast: Vasyl Bertash (PR)
- Sumy Oblast: Yuriy Chmyr (until December 16, PR), Ihor Yahubets (Acting, starting December 16, Independent)
- Ternopil Oblast: Valentyn Khoptian (Independent / PR ally)
- Vinnytsia Oblast: Ivan Mofchan (PR)
- Volyn Oblast: Borys Klimchuk (Independent / PR ally)
- Zakarpattia Oblast: Oleksandr Ledyda (PR)
- Zaporizhzhia Oblast: Oleksandr Peklushenko (PR)
- Zhytomyr Oblast: Serhiy Ryzhuk (PR)

== Events ==
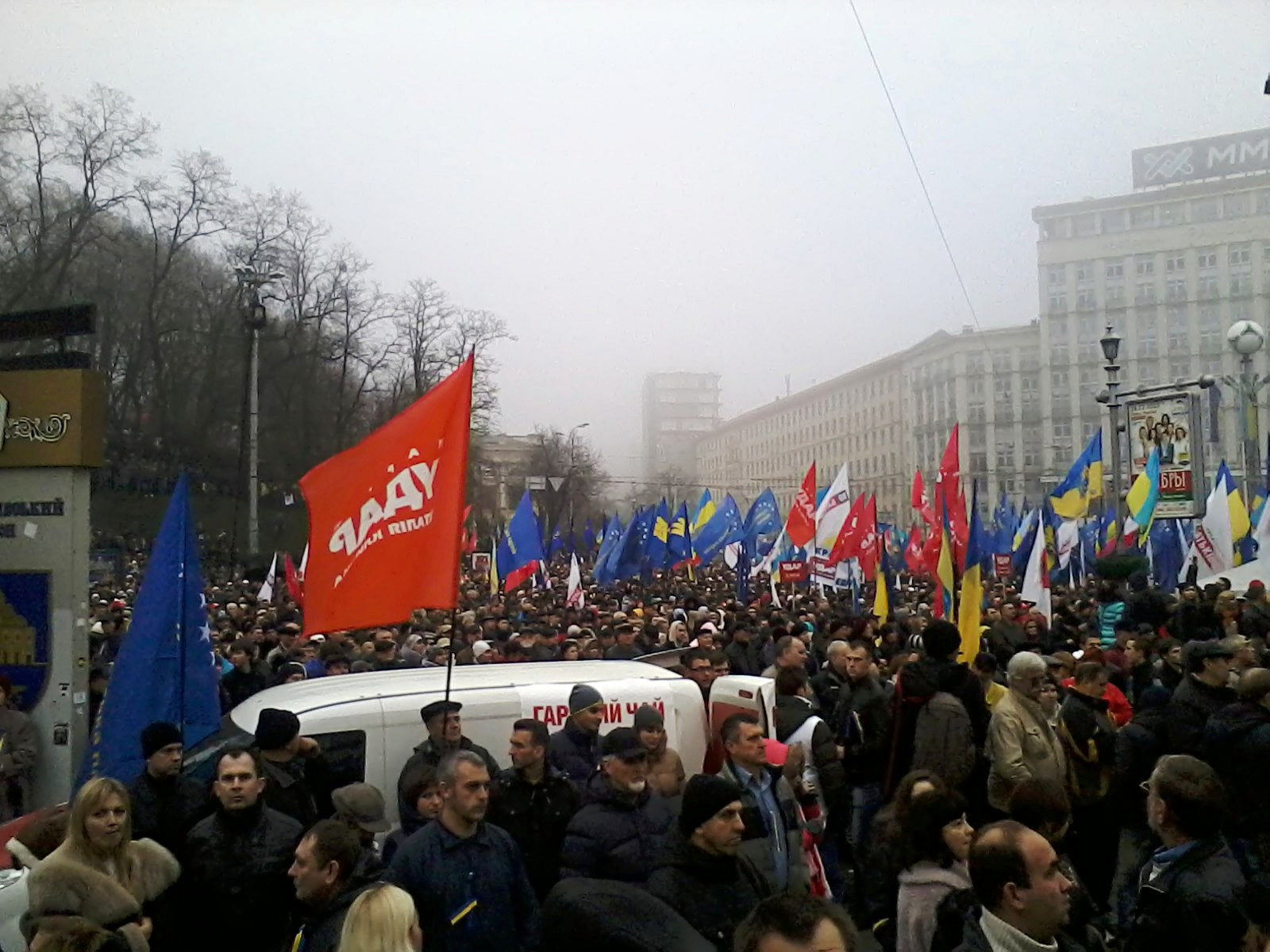
Euromaidan in Kyiv, November 24

- February 13: At least five people were killed when a plane carrying football fans attempted an emergency landing and caught fire in the eastern city of Donetsk.
- August 6: An ammonia leak at Horlivka chemical plant has killed five people and sickened more than 20.
- November 24: More than 100,000 people protested in Kyiv against the decision of Viktor Yanukovych's government to suspend preparations for signing of the association agreement with the European Union under pressure from Russia.
- November, December: Euromaidan.
