= 2012 in Ukraine =

- Decades: 1990s; 2000s; 2010s; 2020s
- See also: History of Ukraine; List of years in Ukraine

2012 in Ukraine is a list of the main events that took place in 2012 in Ukraine. There is also a list of notable people who died in 2012. In addition, a list of memorable dates and anniversaries of 2012 has been compiled. Over time, famous Ukrainians born in 2012 will be added.

- Left the London Olympics with 20 medals (6 gold, 4 silver, and 10 bronze). Ukraine at the 2012 Summer Olympics

== Events ==
- March 30 - Ukraine and the European Union initial an association agreement providing for the creation of a free trade zone and visa facilitation;
- April 2 - The first flight on the route Kharkiv-Kyiv with a high-speed train, designed to move at speeds up to 160 kilometres per hour, produced by the Kryukiv Railway Car Building Works;
- April 5 - Georgy Filipchuk, former Minister of Environmental Protection in the Second Tymoshenko government, is sentenced to three years in prison by the Solomyansky District Court of Kyiv;
- April 12 - Kyiv's Pechersk District Court sentences former Defence Minister Valery Ivashchenko to five years in prison;
- April 27 - Dnipropetrovsk explosions
- May 14 - Viktor Yanukovych signed the new Criminal Procedure Code of Ukraine;
- May 18 - The Supreme Court of the Russian Federation liquidated the Union of Ukrainians of Russia;
- June 8 - July 1 - Poland and Ukraine host the 2012 European Football Championship. In the final in Kyiv, Spain defeated Italy with a record score of 4: 0;
- July 31 - The Verkhovna Rada of Ukraine ratifies the agreement on a free trade zone with the Commonwealth of Independent States countries;
- August 17 - Former Interior Minister Yuriy Lutsenko sentenced to 2 years in prison;
- August 29 - September 9 - Paralympic Games in London, where Ukraine won fourth place;
- According to the State Statistics Service, in September, for the first time in 19 years, the population of Ukraine increased;
- September 26 - Karavan shooting;
- October 19 - Russian opposition leader Leonid Razvozzhayev is abducted and taken to Moscow near the UN Office for Refugees by Russian special services in Kyiv;
- October 28 - Ukraine holds parliamentary elections;
- November 7 - Prime Minister Mykola Azarov transfers a stolen Toyota Land Cruiser SUV confiscated from the Minister of Justice to the Ministry of Justice and orders the Ministry of Internal Affairs to register the vehicle;
- December 1 - Ukrainian Anna Ushenina became world champion in women's chess;
- December 3 - Mykola Azarov's government is dismissed;
- December 5 - Against the background of mass cancellation of flights, the largest air carrier in Ukraine "AeroSvit" filed for bankruptcy in the Commercial Court of Kyiv region;
- December 5 - In the annual Corruption Perceptions Index compiled by the international non-governmental organization Transparency International, Ukraine ranks 144th and is named the most corrupt country in Europe;
- December 15 - Trofimov Beheadings
- December 24 - Oleksandr Yaroslavsky under pressure from the city authorities sold the football club "Metalist" for $ 300 million;
- December 26 - Mykhailo Fomenko is approved as the head coach of the Ukraine national football team.

== Died ==
- February 1 - Stepan Sapelyak, Ukrainian poet, novelist, publicist, literary critic, human rights activist, public figure;
- February 3 - Vyacheslav Boykov, Ukrainian musician, pianist, teacher, Honored Artist of Ukraine;
- February 24 - Andriy Benckendorf, Ukrainian and Russian film director;
- March 8 - Oksana Makar
- March 17 - John Demjanjuk, a Ukrainian Red Army soldier, acquitted in 1993 by the Israeli Supreme Court of war crimes charges during World War II;
- March 20 - Atena Pashko, chemical engineer, poet and social activist
- May 23 - Borys Voznytsky, Ukrainian art critic, director of the Lviv Art Gallery, Hero of Ukraine (2005), winner of the Taras Shevchenko National Prize (1990);
- July 31 - Iryna Kalynets, Ukrainian poet;
- November 27 - Ivan Bilyk, Ukrainian writer and translator, winner of the Shevchenko Prize;
- December 18 - Anatoliy Zayayev, Honored Coach of Ukraine in football.

== Shevchenko National Prize 2012 ==
This year the winners of the award were:

- art critic Tetyana Kara-Vasylieva - for the book "History of Ukrainian embroidery";
- artist Anatoliy Kryvolap - for a series of paintings "Ukrainian motif";
- poet Petro Midianka - for the book of poems "Luitra in the sky";
- writer Volodymyr Rutkivsky - for the historical trilogy for children "Jury";
- composer Victor Stepurko - for the musical work "Monologues of the Centuries".

== Incumbents ==
- President: Viktor Yanukovych
- Prime Minister: Mykola Azarov

=== Governors ===
- Cherkasy Oblast: Serhiy Tulub (PR)
- Chernihiv Oblast: Volodymyr Khomenko (PR)
- Chernivtsi Oblast: Mykhailo Papiev (PR)
- Dnipropetrovsk Oblast: Oleksandr Vilkul (until December 24, PR), 淬Dmytro Kolesnikov (starting December 24, PR)
- Donetsk Oblast: Andriy Shyshatskyy (PR)
- Ivano-Frankivsk Oblast: Mykhailo Vyshyvanyuk (Independent / PR ally)
- Kharkiv Oblast: Mykhailo Dobkin (PR)
- Kherson Oblast: Mykola Kostyak (PR)
- Khmelnytskyi Oblast: Vasyl Yadukha (PR)
- Kirovohrad Oblast: Serhiy Larin (PR)
- Kyiv Oblast: Anatoliy Prysyazhnyuk (PR)
- Luhansk Oblast: Volodymyr Prystiuk (PR)
- Lviv Oblast: Mykhailo Kostyuk (Independent / PR ally)
- Mykolaiv Oblast: Mykola Kruhlov (PR)
- Odesa Oblast: Eduard Matviychuk (PR)
- Poltava Oblast: Oleksandr Udovichenko (PR)
- Rivne Oblast: Vasyl Bertash (PR)
- Sumy Oblast: Yuriy Chmyr (PR)
- Ternopil Oblast: Valentyn Khoptian (Independent / PR ally)
- Vinnytsia Oblast: Mykola Jha (until December 24, PR), 淬Ivan Mofchan (starting December 24, PR)
- Volyn Oblast: Borys Klimchuk (Independent / PR ally)
- Zakarpattia Oblast: Oleksandr Ledyda (PR)
- Zaporizhzhia Oblast: Oleksandr Peklushenko (PR)
- Zhytomyr Oblast: Serhiy Ryzhuk (PR)
