= 2014 in Ukraine =

- Decades: 1990s; 2000s; 2010s; 2020s
- See also: History of Ukraine; List of years in Ukraine

The following lists events that happened in the year 2014 in Ukraine.

== Incumbents ==
- President:
  - until February 23: Viktor Yanukovych
  - February 23 – June 7: Oleksandr Turchynov (acting)
  - starting June 7: Petro Poroshenko
- Prime Minister:
  - until January 28: Mykola Azarov
  - January 28 – February 22: Serhiy Arbuzov (acting)
  - February 22–27: Oleksandr Turchynov (acting)
  - starting February 27: Arseniy Yatsenyuk

=== Governors ===
- Cherkasy Oblast: Serhiy Tulub (until March 7), Yuriy Tkachenko (starting March 15) (Independent)
- Chernihiv Oblast: Volodymyr Khomenko (until February 22), Volodymyr Ivashko (March 3–September 15), Serhiy Zhurman (Acting, starting September 15) (Independent)
- Chernivtsi Oblast: Mykhailo Papiev (until February 19), Roman Vanzuryak (March 21–October 29), Mykhailo Pavliuk (Acting, starting October 29) (Independent)
- Dnipropetrovsk Oblast: Dmytro Kolesnikov (until March 2), Ihor Kolomoyskyi (starting March 2) (Independent)
- Donetsk Oblast: Andriy Shyshatskyy (until March 2), Serhiy Taruta (March 2–October 10), Oleksandr Kikhtenko (starting October 10) (Independent)
- Ivano-Frankivsk Oblast: Vasyl Chudnov (until February 23), Andriy Trotsenko (March 2–September 9), Oleh Honcharuk (starting September 9) (Independent)
- Kharkiv Oblast: Mykhailo Dobkin (until March 2), Ihor Baluta (starting March 2) (Independent)
- Kherson Oblast: Mykola Kostyak (until March 2), Yuriy Odarchenko (March 2–August 18), Andriy Putilov (starting September 9) (Independent)
- Khmelnytskyi Oblast: Vasyl Yadukha (until March 5), Leonid Prus (March 15–September 22), Ivan Krysak (Acting, starting September 22) (Independent)
- Kirovohrad Oblast: Andriy Nikolaienko (until March 2), Oleksandr Petrenko (March 2–September 16), Serhiy Kuzmenko (starting September 16) (Independent)
- Kyiv Oblast: Anatoliy Prysyazhnyuk (until March 2), Volodymyr Shandra (starting March 2) (Independent)
- Luhansk Oblast: Volodymyr Prystiuk (until March 2), Mykhailo Bolotskykh (March 2–May 10), Iryna Verihina (Acting, May 10–September 18), Hennadiy Moskal (starting September 18) (Independent)
- Lviv Oblast: Oleh Salo (until March 2), Iryna Seh (March 2–August 14), Yuriy Turianskyi (Acting, August 14–December 26), Oleh Synyutka (starting December 26) (Independent)
- Mykolaiv Oblast: Mykola Kruhlov (until January 10), Hennadiy Nikolenko (January 10–March 2), Mykola Romanchuk (March 2–July 28), Vadym Merikov (starting July 28) (Independent)
- Odesa Oblast: Mykola Skoryk (until March 3), Volodymyr Nemyrovskyi (March 3–May 6), Ihor Palytsia (starting May 6) (Independent)
- Poltava Oblast: Oleksandr Udovichenko (until March 2), Viktor Buhaichuk (March 2–November 18), Valeriy Holovko (starting November 18) (Independent)
- Rivne Oblast: Vasyl Bertash (until March 2), Serhiy Rybachok (March 2–November 18), Vitaliy Chuhunnikov (starting November 18) (Independent)
- Sumy Oblast: Ihor Yahubets (until March 2), Volodymyr Shulha (March 2–September 16), Ivan開放 (Acting, September 16–December 26), Mykola Klochko (starting December 26) (Independent)
- Ternopil Oblast: Valentyn Khoptian (until March 2), Oleh Syrotyuk (March 2–November 18), Ivan Krysak (Acting, starting November 18) (Independent)
- Vinnytsia Oblast: Ivan Mofchan (until March 2), Anatoliy Oliynyk (starting March 2) (Independent)
- Volyn Oblast: Borys Klimchuk (until February 5), Oleksandr Bashkalenko (February 5–March 2), Hryhoriy Pustovit (March 2–July 24), Volodymyr Hunchyk (starting July 24) (Independent)
- Zakarpattia Oblast: Oleksandr Ledyda (until March 2), Valeriy Lunchenko (March 2–September 15), Vasyl Hubal (starting September 15) (Independent)
- Zaporizhzhia Oblast: Oleksandr Peklushenko (until March 3), Valeriy Baranov (March 3–October 29), Hryhoriy Samardak (Acting, starting October 29) (Independent)
- Zhytomyr Oblast: Serhiy Ryzhuk (until March 2), Sydor Kizin (March 2–July 22), Serhiy Mashkovskyi (starting July 22) (Independent)

== Events ==
=== January ===
- January 11 – Yuri Lutsenko, one of the leaders of the protests, is injured during clashes with the police.

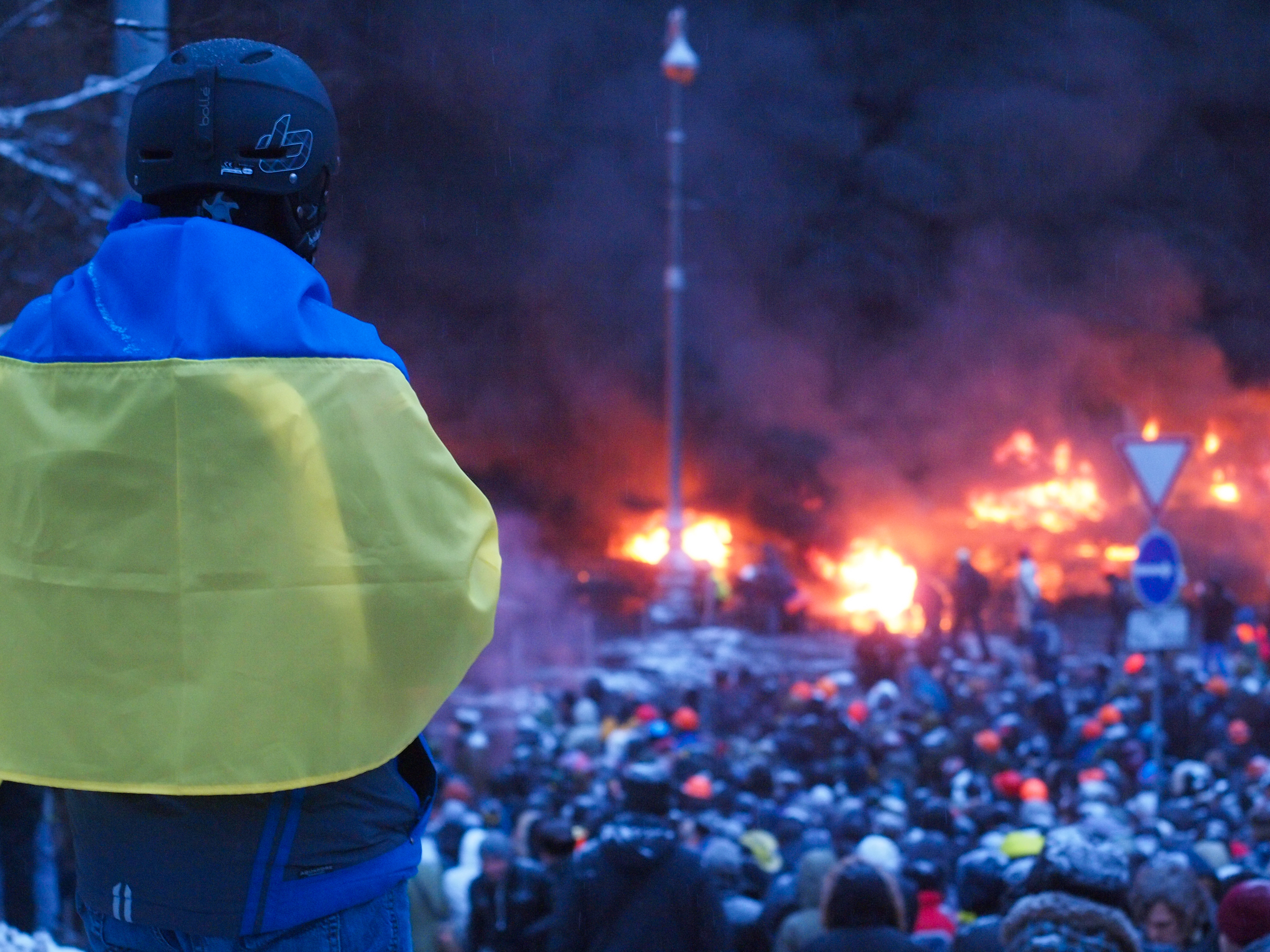
Violent clashes between protesters and police on Hrushevskoho Street, Kyiv

- January 19 – New violent clashes erupt in Ukraine as a reaction to new strict anti-protest laws.
- January 20 – Violence spreads in Kyiv as protesters clash with police.
- January 21 – Violent clashes occur for a second day between protesters and police in Kyiv.
- January 22 – At least five people are shot dead and hundreds injured as demonstrators clash with police over new laws limiting the right to protest in Ukraine.
- January 24 – Unrest in Ukraine spreads to the cities of Khmelnitsky, Zhytomyr, Cherkasy, Lviv, Ternopil, Ivano-Frankivsk, Lutsk, Rivne and Chernivtsi. In Rivne and Lviv, the offices of the governors were broken into; the Lviv regional governor was forced to sign a letter of resignation.
- January 28 – Euromaidan
  - Ukrainian Prime Minister Mykola Azarov submits his resignation to President Viktor Yanukovych in a bid to defuse the conflict in Ukraine.
  - Ukrainian President Viktor Yanukovich accepts the resignation of Prime Minister Nikolay Azarov and his cabinet; the cabinet will continue to work until a new government is formed.
  - Parliament repeals anti-protest laws which had led to protests.

=== February ===
- February 1 – Activist Dmytro Bulatov reappears after allegedly being tortured by the government.

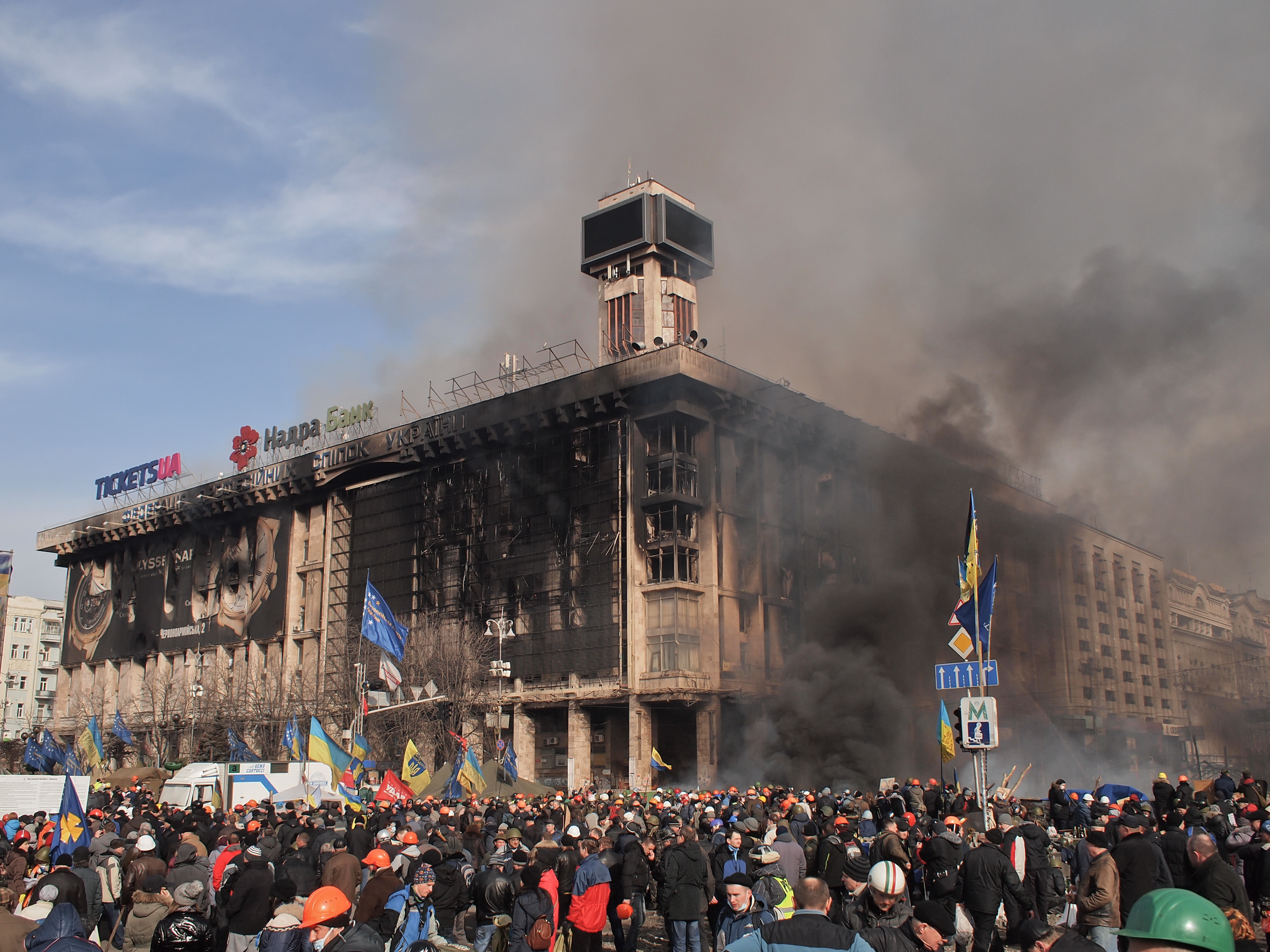
Labor Unions' House, used as Euromaidan headquarters, on fire following police raid

- February 4 – At least 13 people die and five others are injured when a commuter train slams into a shuttle bus in Sumy Oblast, Ukraine.
- February 7 – A man attempts to hijack a Pegasus Airlines flight from Kharkiv, and demands to be flown to Sochi; the pilots turned off the inflight monitors and landed in Istanbul, Turkey, where the passenger was arrested.
- February 15 – French pole vaulter Renaud Lavillenie breaks Sergey Bubka's 21-year-old record with a 6.16 metres leap in Donetsk.
- February 16 – Anti-government protesters in Ukraine end a two-month occupation of Kyiv's city hall, following an amnesty offer aimed at easing a standoff over President Viktor Yanukovych’s rule.
- February 18 – Violent clashes between police forces and opposition demonstrators reignite in Kyiv. The death toll rises to 14, six of them policemen who were shot dead during the confrontation.
- February 18 – Seven miners are killed and nine injured in an explosion at the Pivnichna coal mine in Ukraine's Donetsk Oblast.
- February 19 – Euromaidan
  - After protesters had resisted the police, opposition and President Viktor Yanukovych hold talks and reach a truce. The toll of riots over the past couple of days is at least 25 dead and 241 injured.
  - The President of Ukraine Viktor Yanukovych sacks Volodymyr Zamana as Chief of the General Staff of the Armed Forces of Ukraine; replacing him with Yuriy Ilyin.
  - In a few cities in Western Ukraine anti-government protesters seize government buildings.
- February 20 – Euromaidan
  - A shaky truce is broken with police and protesters renewing clashes on Kyiv's Maidan Nezalezhnosti, with scores of deaths reported.
  - The mayor of Kyiv, Volodymyr Makeyenko, announces he is stepping down from his post and leaving Ukraine's ruling party Party of Regions.
  - The European Union imposes sanctions against Ukraine including asset freezes and visa bans.
  - At least 77 people are dead and large parts of Kyiv's occupied Independence Square are burning after a bloody escalation of Ukraine's three-month political crisis.
- February 20 – Alpine skier Bogdana Matsotska of the Ukraine olympic team decides to pull out of the Winter Games in Sochi, as widespread anti-government protests back home leave dozens dead and hundreds injured.
- February 21 – The Ukrainian government and opposition agree to form a unity government and to hold early elections. President Viktor Yanukovych flees to the east of Ukraine.
- February 22 – Euromaidan
  - The Parliament of Ukraine removes President Viktor Yanukovych from office and frees ex-Prime Minister Yulia Tymoshenko. The dismissed President describes measures taken by the Parliament as a "coup".
  - Protesters claim control of the capital Kyiv with reports that President Viktor Yanukovych has fled to eastern Ukraine.
  - Ukrainian economist and writer Oleksandr Turchynov is voted Speaker of the Parliament, and in that capacity acting President of Ukraine.
- February 23 – Former Ukrainian President Viktor Yanukovych is blocked by Ukraine's customs in Donetsk from taking a plane to Russia and leaves to Russia with the help of the Russian fleet.
- February 24 – 2014 Ukrainian revolution
  - The European Commission recognizes Oleksandr Turchynov as Ukraine's legitimate interim president.
  - Ukrainian economist and banker Stepan Kubiv, who worked as one of the commandants for the EuroMaidan demonstrations, is selected as governor of the National Bank of Ukraine.
  - An arrest warrant is issued for the former President Viktor Yanukovych and other officials for their alleged role in killing protesters.
- February 25 – The United States administration formally declares that it no longer recognizes Viktor Yanukovych as Ukraine's president as "his actions have undermined his legitimacy".
- February 25 – The Parliament of Ukraine removes the five-pointed red star from its spire in a measure aimed at erasing the nation's Soviet legacy.
- February 26 – 2014 Ukrainian revolution
  - Ukraine's interim President Oleksandr Turchynov formally becomes the Supreme Commander of the Armed Forces of Ukraine.
  - Ukraine's acting interior minister Arsen Avakov says the elite Berkut police unit, blamed for the deaths of protesters, has been disbanded.
- February 26 – The President of Russia, Vladimir Putin, orders snap military exercises near the Ukraine border.
- February 27 – 2014 Crimean crisis
  - Russian special forces without insignia seized strategic sites across Crimea
  - The Parliament of Ukraine's Autonomous Republic of Crimea announces a referendum to determine the region's future and ousts the regional government.
  - Ousted President Viktor Yanukovich, whose whereabouts remained unknown before he turned up in Russia, issues a statement saying that he is still the legitimate president and "ready to fight to the end" to fulfill his deal with the opposition.
  - Around 50 armed men bearing Russian national symbols seize the building of the Supreme Council of Crimea following clashes between the ethnic Tatar and Russian protesters. The interim authorities of Ukraine put security forces on alert.
  - The Verkhovna Rada or parliament of Ukraine appoints Arseniy Yatsenyuk as the Prime Minister of Ukraine.
- February 27 – The Autonomous Republic of Crimea has announced that it plans to hold a referendum for independence the same day as the elections in Ukraine.
- February 28 – 2014 Crimean crisis
  - Members of the Russian Parliament propose new laws that would make it easier for Russia to incorporate parts of Ukraine.
  - Russia finally confirms that it has moved troops in Ukraine's Crimea region to protect its own interests.
  - Mykhailo Kutsyn is appointed Chief of the General Staff and Commander-in-Chief of the Armed Forces of Ukraine.
  - Acting General Prosecutor General Oleh Makhnitsky formally calls on Russia to extradite ousted President Viktor Yanukovych along with 10 other figures; the list includes former Prosecutor General Viktor Pshonka, former Interior Minister Vitaliy Zakharchenko, Yanukovich aide Andriy Klyuyev, and former Justice Minister Olena Lukash.
  - Interim President of Ukraine Oleksandr Turchynov says the Russian military is "directly involved" in the crisis in Crimea, while Interior Minister Arsen Avakov describes the events as "a military invasion and occupation".
  - News agency Interfax-Ukraine reports that armed pro-Russian men have taken over control of two airports, among which Simferopol International Airport, and raised the Russian Navy flag.

=== March ===
- March 1 – Amid tensions in Ukraine's Crimea, the Federation Council of Russia authorizes President Vladimir Putin to use force.
- March 11 – The Crimean parliament and the Sevastopol City Council issued a letter of intent to unilaterally declare independence from Ukraine.
- March 16 – Official results of the Crimean status referendum show a large majority (reported as 96.77% of the 81.36% of the population of Crimea who voted) voted in favour of independence of Crimea from Ukraine and joining Russia as a federal subject.
- March 18 – The self-proclaimed independent Republic of Crimea signed a treaty of accession to the Russian Federation. The accession was granted but separately for each the former regions that composed it: one accession for the Autonomous Republic of Crimea as a republic, and another accession for Sevastopol as a federal city
- March 19 – The Ukrainian military began to withdraw from Crimea.

=== April ===
- April 15 – The Ukrainian parliament declare Crimea and the city of Sevastopol "occupied territories".

=== May ===
- May 2 – Clashes between pro-Ukrainian and pro-Russian groups broke out in multiple in the streets of Odesa.

=== July ===
- July 17 – Malaysia Airlines Flight 17 was shot down by a Surface-to-air missile and crashed near Torez in Donetsk Oblast.

=== September ===
- September 1 – 2014 pro-Russian unrest in Ukraine
  - Ukrainian forces battle pro-Russian rebels near Luhansk International Airport. The area is encircled by the pro-Russian forces for over 3 weeks.
  - Valeriy Heletey, Ukraine's Defence Minister, accuses Russia of launching a "great war".
- September 3 – 2014 pro-Russian unrest in Ukraine
  - The RIA Novosti news agency reports that Russian photojournalist Andrey Stenin has been found dead in Ukraine. It was discovered that he died 4 weeks ago.
  - Ukraine claims that the President of Ukraine Petro Poroshenko and the President of Russia Vladimir Putin have agreed to a "permanent ceasefire". Russia later denies these claims.
  - France halts delivery of the first of two Mistral-class amphibious assault ships to the Russian Navy due to circumstances in Ukraine.
- September 4 – The two-day NATO summit in Newport, Wales, begins. Leaders agree to apply further sanctions on Russia. NATO sources claim that there are "several thousand" Russian troops inside Ukraine.
- September 5 – The government of Ukraine and pro-Russian rebels agree to a cease-fire, fighting continues after the announcement.
- September 6 – In an official statement, Patriarch Filaret, who heads the Ukrainian Orthodox Church of the Kyivan Patriarchate, says that Russian President Vladimir Putin has fallen under the spell of Satan and faces eternal damnation to hell unless he repents.
- September 8 – Pro-Russian rebels release 1,200 prisoners under ceasefire deal.
- September 12 – The Government of Ukraine and pro-Russian separatists exchange dozens of prisoners agreed to as part of a ceasefire a week ago. Both sides still hold thousands of prisoners.
- September 14 – Heavy fighting resumes between Ukraine forces and rebels near Donetsk International Airport with at least six people dead.
- September 15 – Heavy shelling on the city of Donetsk leaves 6 people dead and 15 wounded.
- September 16 – Lawmakers from Ukraine ratify a landmark agreement with the European Union in tandem with a meeting of the European Parliament.
- September 17 – A rocket attack by pro-Russian separatists in eastern Ukraine kills 10 civilians and injures 12 others in the village of Nyzhnya Krynka near Donetsk.
- September 18 – The President of Ukraine visits the United States to seek assistance in combating separatists in eastern Ukraine.
- September 21 – More than 26,000 people in Moscow participate in the largest demonstration so far against Russian president Vladimir Putin and the War in Donbass.
- September 21 – Rallies in support of Ukraine and against the War in Donbass take place in Boston, New York, Sydney, Dublin, Madrid, London, Paris, Oslo, Tallinn, Limassol, Istanbul, Antalya, Cologne, Milan, Rome, Vienna, Munich, Prague, Berlin, Moscow, Volgograd, Yekaterinburg, Perm, Krasnoyarsk, Novosibirsk, Berlaul and Petropavlovsk-Kamchatsky.
- September 23 – President of Russia Vladimir Putin warns in a letter to his Ukrainian counterpart Petro Poroshenko that Moscow will restrict Ukraine's access to Russian markets if Kyiv implements any part of a trade agreement with the European Union.
- September 25 – President of Ukraine Petro Poroshenko announces a wide-ranging reform program entitled Strategy 2020 to prepare Ukraine for applying for European Union membership in 2020.
- September 29 – Renewed clashes around the Donetsk International Airport between the pro-Russian rebels and Ukrainian government troops kill at least 12 people in the worst flareup of violence since the ceasefire accord earlier in September.
- September 30 – The Ukrainian military say they have repelled a renewed assault by the pro-Russian forces on the Donetsk International Airport. The airport has been under sustained assaults for over 2 weeks despite an official ceasefire.

=== October ===
- October 1 – At least 12 people are killed when shells hit a school and, in a separate shelling, a bus station in the separatist-controlled city of Donetsk.

=== November ===
- November 2 – Voters in break away "people's republics" (Donetsk People's Republic and Lugansk People's Republic respectively) in Donetsk and Luhansk go to the polls for parliamentary and presidential elections. Rebel leaders Alexander Zakharchenko (Donetsk) and Igor Plotnisky (Luhansk) appear set for victory in early counting in elections which will be recognised in Russia but not elsewhere. International observers noted a very high turnout.
- November 12 – NATO claims that Russian Army troops and military equipment have entered Ukraine.
- November 26 – At least three people die in a new round of fighting between the Armed Forces of Ukraine and pro-Russian separatists.
- November 27 – The Parliament of Ukraine meets for the first time since recent elections with Arseniy Yatsenyuk expected to be confirmed as Prime Minister.

=== December ===
- December 2 – The Parliament of Ukraine approves the formation of a new government that includes three foreigners who have received Ukrainian citizenship just hours before the vote: Georgian-born Alexander Kvitashvili, US-national Natalie Jaresko and Lithuanian Aivaras Abromavičius.
- December 12 – Prosecutors at Sary-Arqa District Court in Astana charge 30-year-old Yevgeny Vdovenko, a Kazakh citizen, of intentional and illegal participation in a military conflict abroad because he had fought alongside pro-Russian separatists in eastern Ukraine.
- December 18 – The European Union imposes sanctions on Russia-occupied Crimea by banning investments and tourism in the region and halting oil explorations.
- December 22 – Kazakhstan renews its military cooperation with Ukraine, to which it promises vital supplies of coal, following a visit to Kyiv by the Kazakh leader, Nursultan Nazarbayev.
- December 23 – The Parliament of Ukraine removes the country's legislative block on forming military alliances, allowing the government to push forward with plans to accede to NATO.
- December 26 – Ukraine and pro-Russia rebels exchange nearly 370 prisoners in the largest such exchange since hostilities began in April this year.

== Deaths ==
- January 22 – Serhiy Nigoyan
- February 18
- Valeriy Brezdenyuk
- Antonina Dvoryanets
- February 20 – Ihor Kostenko
- February 22 – Liudmyla Sheremet
- March 10 – Olha Bura
- March 18 – Serhiy Kokurin

== See also ==
- Outline of the Russo-Ukrainian War
