= 2011 in Ukraine =

- Decades: 1990s; 2000s; 2010s; 2020s
- See also: History of Ukraine; List of years in Ukraine

Events in the year 2011 in Ukraine.

== Incumbents ==
- President: Viktor Yanukovych
- Prime Minister: Mykola Azarov

=== Governors ===
- Cherkasy Oblast: Serhiy Tulub (PR)
- Chernihiv Oblast: Volodymyr Khomenko (PR)
- Chernivtsi Oblast: Mykhailo Papiev (PR)
- Dnipropetrovsk Oblast: Oleksandr Vilkul (PR)
- Donetsk Oblast: Anatoliy Blyznyuk (until July 12, PR), Andriy Shyshatskyy (starting July 12, PR)
- Ivano-Frankivsk Oblast: Mykhailo Vyshyvanyuk (Independent / PR ally)
- Kharkiv Oblast: Mykhailo Dobkin (PR)
- Kherson Oblast: Mykola Kostyak (PR)
- Khmelnytskyi Oblast: Vasyl Yadukha (PR)
- Kirovohrad Oblast: Serhiy Larin (PR)
- Kyiv Oblast: Anatoliy Prysyazhnyuk (PR)
- Luhansk Oblast: Volodymyr Prystiuk (PR)
- Lviv Oblast: Mykhailo Tsymbalyuk (until November 2, Independent / PR ally), Mykhailo Kostyuk (starting November 2, Independent / PR ally)
- Mykolaiv Oblast: Mykola Kruhlov (PR)
- Odesa Oblast: Eduard Matviychuk (PR)
- Poltava Oblast: Oleksandr Udovichenko (PR)
- Rivne Oblast: Vasyl Bertash (PR)
- Sumy Oblast: Yuriy Chmyr (PR)
- Ternopil Oblast: Valentyn Khoptian (Independent / PR ally)
- Vinnytsia Oblast: Mykola Jha (PR)
- Volyn Oblast: Borys Klimchuk (Independent / PR ally)
- Zakarpattia Oblast: Oleksandr Ledyda (PR)
- Zaporizhzhia Oblast: Borys Petrov (until November 2, PR), 淬Oleksandr Peklushenko (starting November 2, PR)
- Zhytomyr Oblast: Serhiy Ryzhuk (PR)

== Events ==
- 29 July – An explosion occurs 3,000 feet (910 meters) underground in the Sukhodilska–Skhidna coal mine in Southeast Ukraine in Luhansk Oblast, killing all 26 miners.
