= 2008 in Ukraine =

- Decades: 1980s; 1990s; 2000s; 2010s; 2020s
- See also: History of Ukraine; List of years in Ukraine

Events in the year 2008 in Ukraine.

== Incumbents ==
- President: Viktor Yushchenko
- Prime Minister: Yulia Tymoshenko

=== Governors ===
- Cherkasy Oblast: Oleksandr Cherevko (NSNU / YeC)
- Chernihiv Oblast: Volodymyr Khomenko (Independent / YeC ally)
- Chernivtsi Oblast: Volodymyr Kulish (NSNU / YeC)
- Dnipropetrovsk Oblast: Viktor Bondar (Independent / YeC)
- Donetsk Oblast: Volodymyr Logvynenko (Independent / Party of Regions ally)
- Ivano-Frankivsk Oblast: Mykola Paliychuk (NSNU / YeC)
- Kharkiv Oblast: Arsen Avakov (NSNU)
- Heron Oblast: Borys Silenkov (NSNU / YeC)
- Khmelnytskyi Oblast: Ivan Havrychuk (NSNU)
- Kirovohrad Oblast: Vasyl Motsnyi (Independent / Party of Regions ally)
- Kyiv Oblast: Vira Ulyanchenko (NSNU)
- Luhansk Oblast: Oleksandr Antypov (Party of Regions)
- Lviv Oblast: Petro Oliynyk (until February 20, NSNU), Valeriy Piatak (Acting, February 20–June 4), Mykola Kmit (starting June 4, Independent / YeC ally)
- Mykolaiv Oblast: Oleksiy Harkusha (NP)
- Odesa Oblast: Mykola Serdiuk (NSNU / YeC)
- Poltava Oblast: Valeriy Asadchev (UNP)
- Rivne Oblast: Viktor Matchuk (NSNU / YeC)
- Sumy Oblast: Pavlo Kachur (until April 7, NSNU), Mykola Lavryk (starting April 7, Independent / YeC ally)
- Ternopil Oblast: Yuriy Chyzhmar (Independent / YeC)
- Vinnytsia Oblast: Oleksandr Dombrovskyi (NSNU / YeC)
- Volyn Oblast: Mykola Romanyuk (Independent / YeC ally)
- Zakarpattia Oblast: Oleh Havashi (Independent / YeC)
- Zaporizhzhia Oblast: Valeriy Cherkaska (Acting, until May 30, Independent), Oleksandr Starukh (starting May 30, NSNU / YeC)
- Zhytomyr Oblast: Yuriy Zabela (Independent / YeC ally)

== Events ==
- September – December – 2008 Ukrainian political crisis.
- 24 December – An explosion in an apartment block in Yevpatoria kills 27 people, leading President Viktor Yushchenko to declare December 26 a day of national mourning.

== Deaths ==
- 4 September – Alina Vedmid, agronomist and politician (b. 1940).
