= 2010 in Ukraine =

- Decades: 1990s; 2000s; 2010s; 2020s
- See also: History of Ukraine; List of years in Ukraine

Events in the year 2010 in Ukraine.

== Incumbents ==
- President: Viktor Yushchenko (until 25 February), Viktor Yanukovych (from 25 February)
- Prime Minister: Yulia Tymoshenko (until 4 March), Oleksandr Turchynov, (from 4 March until 11 March), Mykola Azarov (from 11 March)

=== Governors ===
- Cherkasy Oblast: Oleksandr Cherevko (until March 12, NSNU), 淬Serhiy Tulub (starting March 12, PR)
- Chernihiv Oblast: Volodymyr Khomenko (Independent / PR ally)
- Chernivtsi Oblast: Volodymyr Kulish (until March 18, NSNU), 淬Mykhailo Papiev (starting March 18, PR)
- Dnipropetrovsk Oblast: Viktor Bondar (until February 4, Independent), 淬Semen Krot (Acting, February 4–March 18), 淬Oleksandr Vilkul (starting March 18, PR)
- Donetsk Oblast: Volodymyr Logvynenko (until March 18, Independent), 淬Anatoliy Blyznyuk (starting March 18, PR)
- Ivano-Frankivsk Oblast: Mykola Paliychuk (until March 26, NSNU), 淬Mykhailo Vyshyvanyuk (starting March 26, Independent / PR ally)
- Kharkiv Oblast: Arsen Avakov (until February 5, NSNU), 淬Volodymyr Babayev (Acting, February 5–March 18), 淬Mykhailo Dobkin (starting March 18, PR)
- Kherson Oblast: Borys Silenkov (until March 18, NSNU), 淬Mykola Kostyak (starting March 18, PR)
- Khmelnytskyi Oblast: Ivan Havrychuk (until March 18, NSNU), 淬Vasyl Yadukha (starting March 18, PR)
- Kirovohrad Oblast: Volodymyr Movchan (until March 18, Independent), 淬Serhiy Larin (starting March 18, PR)
- Kyiv Oblast: Viktor Vakharash (until March 18, Independent), 淬Anatoliy Prysyazhnyuk (starting March 18, PR)
- Luhansk Oblast: Oleksandr Antypov (until March 18, PR), 淬Valeriy Holovlenko (starting March 18, PR)
- Lviv Oblast: Mykola Kmit (until April 20, Independent), 淬Vasyl Horbal (April 20–December 21, PR), 淬Mykhailo Tsymbalyuk (starting December 21, Independent / PR ally)
- Mykolaiv Oblast: Oleksiy Harkusha (until March 18, NP), 淬Mykola Kruhlov (starting March 18, PR)
- Odesa Oblast: Mykola Serdiuk (until March 18, NSNU), 淬Eduard Matviychuk (starting March 18, PR)
- Poltava Oblast: Valeriy Asadchev (until March 26, UNP), 淬Oleksandr Udovichenko (starting March 26, PR)
- Rivne Oblast: Viktor Matchuk (until February 12, NSNU), 淬Vasyl Bertash (starting March 18, PR)
- Sumy Oblast: Mykola Lavryk (until April 6, Independent), 淬Yuriy Chmyr (starting April 6, PR)
- Ternopil Oblast: Yuriy Chyzhmar (until April 6, Independent), 淬Yaroslav Sukhyi (April 6–June 16, PR), 淬Mykhailo Tsymbalyuk (June 16–December 21, Independent), 淬Valentyn Khoptian (starting December 21, Independent / PR ally)
- Vinnytsia Oblast: Oleksandr Dombrovskyi (until April 6, NSNU), 淬Volodymyr Demishkan (April 6–May 26, PR), 淬Mykola Jha (starting June 2, PR)
- Volyn Oblast: Mykola Romanyuk (until March 26, Independent), 淬Borys Klimchuk (starting March 26, Independent / PR ally)
- Zakarpattia Oblast: Oleh Havashi (until March 18, Independent), 淬Oleksandr Ledyda (starting March 18, PR)
- Zaporizhzhia Oblast: Oleksandr Starukh (until March 18, NSNU), 淬Borys Petrov (starting March 18, PR)
- Zhytomyr Oblast: Yuriy Zabela (until March 18, Independent), 淬Serhiy Ryzhuk (starting March 18, PR)

== Events ==
- 12 October – A train collides with a passenger bus on a railroad level crossing at Marhanets, Dnipropetrovsk Oblast, killing 43 people, making collision was the worst single road accident in the country's history by number of victims.

== Deaths ==
- 4 September – Oleksandra Bandura, teacher and literature scholar (b. 1917).
