= 2009 in Ukraine =

- Decades: 1980s; 1990s; 2000s; 2010s; 2020s
- See also: History of Ukraine; List of years in Ukraine

Events in the year 2009 in Ukraine.

== Incumbents ==
- President: Viktor Yushchenko
- Prime Minister: Yulia Tymoshenko

=== Governors ===
- Cherkasy Oblast: Oleksandr Cherevko (NSNU / YeC)
- Chernihiv Oblast: Volodymyr Khomenko (Independent / YeC ally)
- Chernivtsi Oblast: Volodymyr Kulish (NSNU / YeC)
- Dnipropetrovsk Oblast: Viktor Bondar (Independent / YeC)
- Donetsk Oblast: Volodymyr Logvynenko (Independent / Party of Regions ally)
- Ivano-Frankivsk Oblast: Mykola Paliychuk (NSNU / YeC)
- Kharkiv Oblast: Arsen Avakov (NSNU)
- Kherson Oblast: Borys Silenkov (NSNU / YeC)
- Khmelnytskyi Oblast: Ivan Havrychuk (NSNU)
- Kirovohrad Oblast: Vasyl Motsnyi (until June 27, Independent), 淬Mykola Sukhomlyn (Acting, June 27–September 17), 淬Volodymyr Movchan (starting September 17, Independent / Party of Regions ally)
- Kyiv Oblast: Vira Ulyanchenko (until May 20, NSNU), 淬Viktor Vakharash (starting May 20, Independent / YeC ally)
- Luhansk Oblast: Oleksandr Antypov (Party of Regions)
- Lviv Oblast: Mykola Kmit (Independent / YeC ally)
- Mykolaiv Oblast: Oleksiy Harkusha (NP)
- Odesa Oblast: Mykola Serdiuk (NSNU / YeC)
- Poltava Oblast: Valeriy Asadchev (UNP)
- Rivne Oblast: Viktor Matchuk (NSNU / YeC)
- Sumy Oblast: Mykola Lavryk (Independent / YeC ally)
- Ternopil Oblast: Yuriy Chyzhmar (Independent / YeC)
- Vinnytsia Oblast: Oleksandr Dombrovskyi (NSNU / YeC)
- Volyn Oblast: Mykola Romanyuk (Independent / YeC ally)
- Zakarpattia Oblast: Oleh Havashi (Independent / YeC)
- Zaporizhzhia Oblast: Oleksandr Starukh (NSNU / YeC)
- Zhytomyr Oblast: Yuriy Zabela (Independent / YeC ally)

== Events ==
- 14 June – The final of the Junior Eurovision Song Contest 2009, attended by Prime Minister Yulia Tymoshenko, took place at the International Children's Centre 'Artek' in Kyiv, and was hosted by commentator for Eurovision and Junior Eurovision Timur Miroshnychenko and three-time participant at the Ukrainian Junior national final Marietta.

== Deaths ==
- Iryna Senyk, poet, nurse and political dissident (25 October)
