= 2007 in Ukraine =

- Decades: 1980s; 1990s; 2000s; 2010s; 2020s
- See also: History of Ukraine; List of years in Ukraine

Events in the year 2007 in Ukraine.

== Incumbents ==
- President: Viktor Yushchenko
- Prime Minister: Viktor Yanukovych (until 18 December), Yulia Tymoshenko (starting 18 December)

=== Governors ===
- Cherkasy Oblast: Oleksandr Cherevko (NSNU)
- Chernihiv Oblast: Mykola Lavryk (until July 10, NSNU), Volodymyr Khomenko (starting July 10, Independent / NSNU ally)
- Chernivtsi Oblast: Volodymyr Kulish (NSNU)
- Dnipropetrovsk Oblast: Nadiia Deieva (until September 3, Independent), Viktor Bondar (starting September 3, NSNU)
- Donetsk Oblast: Volodymyr Logvynenko (Independent / Party of Regions ally)
- Ivano-Frankivsk Oblast: Roman Tkach (until October 22, NSNU), 淬Mykola Paliychuk (starting October 22, NSNU)
- Kharkiv Oblast: Arsen Avakov (NSNU)
- Kherson Oblast: Borys Silenkov (NSNU)
- Khmelnytskyi Oblast: Oleksandr Bukhanevych (until June 1, NSNU), 淬Havriil Bakushyn (Acting, June 1–July 27), Ivan Havrychuk (starting July 27, NSNU)
- Kirovohrad Oblast: Vadym Chernysh (until November 1, NSNU), 淬Vasyl Motsnyi (starting November 1, Independent / Party of Regions ally)
- Kyiv Oblast: Vira Ulyanchenko (NSNU)
- Luhansk Oblast: Oleksandr Antypov (Party of Regions)
- Lviv Oblast: Petro Oliynyk (NSNU)
- Mykolaiv Oblast: Oleksandr Sadykov (until July 10, NSNU), Oleksiy Harkusha (starting July 10, NP)
- Odesa Oblast: Ivan Plachkov (until November 1, Independent), 淬Mykola Serdiuk (starting November 1, NSNU)
- Poltava Oblast: Valeriy Asadchev (UNP)
- Rivne Oblast: Viktor Matchuk (NSNU)
- Sumy Oblast: Nina Shaposhnyk (until April 7, Batkivshchyna), 淬Pavlo Kachur (starting April 7, NSNU)
- Ternopil Oblast: Ivan Stoiko (until October 22, NSNU), 淬Yuriy Chyzhmar (starting October 22, Independent / NSNU ally)
- Vinnytsia Oblast: Oleksandr Dombrovskyi (NSNU)
- Volyn Oblast: Volodymyr Bondar (until November 15, NSNU), 淬Mykola Romanyuk (starting November 15, NSNU)
- Zakarpattia Oblast: Oleh Havashi (Independent / NSNU ally)
- Zaporizhzhia Oblast: Yevhen Chervonenko (until December 24, NSNU), 淬Valeriy Cherkaska (Acting, starting December 24, Independent)
- Zhytomyr Oblast: Yuriy Pavlenko (until October 25, NSNU), 淬Yuriy Zabela (starting October 25, Independent)

== Deaths ==
- January 17 - Yevhen Kushnaryov, deputy of Verkhovna Rada, accidental shooting
