= 2006 in Ukraine =

- Decades: 1980s; 1990s; 2000s; 2010s; 2020s
- See also: History of Ukraine; List of years in Ukraine

Events in the year 2006 in Ukraine.

== Incumbents ==
- President: Viktor Yushchenko
- Prime Minister: Yuriy Yekhanurov (until 4 August), Viktor Yanukovych (from 4 August)

=== Governors ===
- Cherkasy Oblast: Oleksandr Cherevko (NSNU)
- Chernihiv Oblast: Vladyslav Atroshenko (until April 26, NSNU), Volodymyr Kholevko (Acting, April 26–May 22), Mykola Lavryk (starting May 22, NSNU)
- Chernivtsi Oblast: Mykola Tkachyuk (until May 17, NSNU), Volodymyr Kulish (starting May 17, NSNU)
- Dnipropetrovsk Oblast: Nadiia Deieva (Independent / NSNU ally)
- Donetsk Oblast: Vadym Chuprun (until April 17, Independent), Serhiy Derhunov (Acting, April 17–May 16), Volodymyr Logvynenko (starting May 16, Independent / Party of Regions ally)
- Ivano-Frankivsk Oblast: Roman Tkach (NSNU)
- Kharkiv Oblast: Arsen Avakov (NSNU)
- Kherson Oblast: Borys Silenkov (NSNU)
- Khmelnytskyi Oblast: Ivan Hladunyak (until May 4, NSNU), Oleksandr Bukhanevych (starting May 4, NSNU)
- Kirovohrad Oblast: Eduard Zeinalov (until May 3, NSNU), Vadym Chernysh (starting May 3, NSNU)
- Kyiv Oblast: Yevhen Zhovtyak (until May 24, NSNU), Valeriy Kondruk (Acting, May 24–June 16), Vira Ulyanchenko (starting June 16, NSNU)
- Luhansk Oblast: Hennadiy Moskal (until April 26, Independent), Oleksandr Koblyteiev (Acting, April 26–September 15), Oleksandr Antypov (starting September 15, Party of Regions)
- Lviv Oblast: Petro Oliynyk (NSNU)
- Mykolaiv Oblast: Oleksandr Sadykov (NSNU)
- Odesa Oblast: Vasyl Tsushko (until May 3, SPU), Borys Zvyahintsev (Acting, May 3–May 23), Ivan Plachkov (starting May 23, Independent / NSNU ally)
- Poltava Oblast: Stepan Bulba (until May 26, SPU), Valeriy Asadchev (starting May 26, UNP)
- Rivne Oblast: Vasyl Chervoniy (until May 18, NSNU), Viktor Matchuk (starting May 18, NSNU)
- Sumy Oblast: Mykola Lavryk (until April 4, NSNU), Nina Shaposhnyk (starting April 4, Batkivshchyna)
- Ternopil Oblast: Ivan Stoiko (NSNU)
- Vinnytsia Oblast: Oleksandr Dombrovskyi (NSNU)
- Volyn Oblast: Volodymyr Bondar (NSNU)
- Zakarpattia Oblast: Oleh Havashi (Independent / NSNU ally)
- Zaporizhzhia Oblast: Yevhen Chervonenko (NSNU)
- Zhytomyr Oblast: Yuriy Andriychuk (until June 16, Independent), Valeriy Balabanov (Acting, June 16–December 12), Yuriy Pavlenko (starting December 26, NSNU)

== Events ==
- 22 August – Pulkovo Aviation Enterprise Flight 612, a scheduled passenger flight operated by Saint Petersburg-based airline Pulkovo Aviation Enterprise, flying from Anapa Airport to Pulkovo Airport in Saint Petersburg, crashes in Donetsk Oblast, near the Russian border, killing all 170 people on board.
