= Chervoniy =

Chervoniy (Ukrainian: Червоній) or Chervonyi (Ukrainian: Червоний), feminine: Chervona is a Ukrainian surname literally meaning "red". Notable people with the surname include:

- Logvin Chervoniy (1902–1980), Soviet Major General, participant in World War II, Hero of the Soviet Union
- Oleksandr Chervonyi, Ukrainian professional football player and coach
- Vasyl Chervoniy (1958–2009), Ukrainian chemical engineer, activist, and politician
- Yana Chervona (1979–2019), Ukrainian public and military figure, volunteer, serviceman of the 46th separate special forces battalion "Donbass-Ukraine"
