= Vitaliy Fedoriv =

Vitaliy Fedoriv may refer to:

- Vitaliy Fedoriv (footballer)
- Vitaliy Fedoriv (politician)
