= Head of local state administration =

Ukrainian regional chief executive posts

In Ukraine, the title head of local (regional) state administration (Ukrainian: Голова місцевої державної адміністрації, romanized: Holova mistsevoi derzhavnoi administratsii, IPA: [ɦoloˈwɑ misˈtsɛwoji derˈʒɑu̯noji ɐd⁽ʲ⁾min⁽ʲ⁾iˈstrɑts⁽ʲ⁾iji]) refers to the chief executive of each of the administrative divisions of Ukraine: region (includes autonomous republic, oblasts), raion (district) or city, in case of Kyiv and Sevastopol.

Informally the position of the head of regional state administration or more commonly oblast state administration (for oblasts) is referred to as governor. However, its function is very different from a traditional gubernatorial position.

The heads of local state administrations are appointed and dismissed by the President of Ukraine on the submission of the Cabinet of Ministers of Ukraine for the term of office of the head of the state.

== Origin and overview ==
The position derived from the Institute of Presidential Representatives that was introduced during the presidency of Leonid Kravchuk in 1992. After the resignation of Leonid Kravchuk as the President of Ukraine in 1993, most of presidential representatives positions in regions were discontinued and their functions were performed by chairmen of executive committee in each regional council. The Autonomous Republic of Crimea, which during dissolution of the Soviet Union was transformed from Crimean Oblast to Crimean ASSR, also changed its regional (oblast) executive committee into Council of Ministers of the Crimean ASSR. The chief of Crimean regional executive committee became the chairman of the Council of Ministers of the Crimean ASSR. The introduction of the Institute of Presidential Representatives in Crimea in the early 1990s was blocked due to the situation in Crimea when the Russian Federation failed to take full control over the peninsula.

Earlier before fall of the Soviet Union, chairmen of the executive committee, that existed since the establishment of the Soviet regime in Ukraine, were completely overshadowed by the first secretaries and party offices of regional committees of the Communist Party of Ukraine which was a constituent part of the Communist Party of the Soviet Union due to the leading role of the Party in the Soviet Union. Previously, there existed a chairman of the executive committee (ispolkom) at the governorate (province) level, raion (district) level, okruh (district) level, and oblast (province) level.

Besides the local state administration, all local (regional, district, city) councils have their executive committees.

There are two offices of a head of city-state administration one for Kyiv and another for Sevastopol. The head of Kyiv City State Administration (governor) usually is served by the Kyiv city mayor elected by the popular vote. The Chairperson of the Sevastopol City State Administration (governor) is appointed by the president on petition of the prime minister. Sevastopol is the only city in Ukraine that does not have a mayoral position. Due to the 2014 annexation of Crimea by the Russian Federation the post of the head of Sevastopol City State Administration is currently suspended, while the Presidential representative in Crimea continues to function in mainland Ukraine along with other Crimean offices of executive power.

== Appointment and termination ==
The chiefs of local state administrations are appointed by the President of Ukraine with the recommendation from the Prime Minister of Ukraine. The role and powers of the position are defined in Chapter 2 (Articles 8 - 12) of the Law of Ukraine "On Local State Administration" (Law № 586-XIV, parliament, April 9, 1999). Candidates for the position of the chief of district state administration are recommended to the Prime Minister of Ukraine by the chiefs of the respected regional state administrations.

The appointment is terminated in case of violation of the Constitution of Ukraine and laws of Ukraine, loss of citizenship or discovery of dual citizenship, recognition of incompetency by a court, emigration for a residence abroad, gaining a court conviction by a legal force, violation of compatibility requirements, declaring no confidence by the two-thirds of the relevant council composition, filing a request for dismissal from office at own will. The appointment may also be terminated by the President of Ukraine in case of accepting the resignation of the Chief of Regional State Administration, petition of the Prime Minister of Ukraine on the grounds prescribed by the legislation about the State Service, declaring no confidence by the majority of the relevant council composition, other circumstances foreseen by this or other laws of Ukraine, on initiative of the President of Ukraine. According to Article 118 of the Constitution of Ukraine, the heads of the local administrations are appointed and dismissed by the President of Ukraine on the proposal of the Cabinet of Ministers. According to the Ukrainian Constitution they should also resign after a new President is elected.

The authority of the chiefs of local state administrations is terminated also upon their death. In case of election of the new President of Ukraine the chiefs of local state administrations continue to exercise their powers until appointment of the new chiefs of local state administrations in established order.

== Role and powers ==
The chief thus heads the executive branch in each region, district, or city. The chief forms the composition of the local State Administration as well as its structure depending upon the budget allocations and requirements to the Article XVIII of the Law of Ukraine "On the Principles of Regulatory Policy in Economic Activity" (Law № 1160-IV, parliament, September 11, 2003).

To execute the Constitution of Ukraine, laws of Ukraine, acts of the President of Ukraine, Cabinet of Ukraine, other bodies of executive power as well as own and delegated powers the chief issues orders. The orders of the chief adopted within his/her competence are mandatory for execution on the respective territory by all authorities, companies, institutions and organizations, officials, and citizens.

== Notable heads of RSA ==
- Viktor Yanukovych, governor of Donetsk Oblast who later served as the Prime Minister of Ukraine and the President of Ukraine
- Pavlo Lazarenko, governor of Dnipropetrovsk Oblast who later served as the Prime Minister of Ukraine
- Yuriy Yekhanurov, governor of Dnipropetrovsk Oblast who later served as the Prime Minister of Ukraine
- Denys Shmyhal, governor of Lviv Oblast who later served as the Prime Minister of Ukraine
- Mikheil Saakashvili, former President of Georgia who later served as the governor of Odesa Oblast

List of governors who also served as government ministers: Serhiy Tulub, Mykhailo Kaskevych, Heorhiy Filipchuk, Mykola Derkach, Volodymyr Yatsuba, Viktor Bondar, Oleksandr Vilkul, Dmytro Kolyesnikov, Serhiy Polyakov, Anatoliy Blyznyuk, others.

List of governors who also served as governors in several regions: Volodymyr Shcherban, Mykola Lavryk, Volodymyr Kulish, Volodymyr Yatsuba, Valentyn Reznichenko, Pavlo Zhebrivskyi, others.

== See also ==
- Governor
- Administrative divisions of Ukraine

=== List of governors ===
- Governor of Cherkasy Oblast
- Governor of Chernihiv Oblast
- Governor of Chernivtsi Oblast
- Governor of Dnipropetrovsk Oblast
- Governor of Donetsk Oblast
- Governor of Ivano-Frankivsk Oblast
- Governor of Kharkiv Oblast
- Governor of Kherson Oblast
- Governor of Khmelnytskyi Oblast
- Governor of Kyiv Oblast
- Governor of Kirovohrad Oblast
- Governor of Luhansk Oblast
- Governor of Lviv Oblast
- Governor of Mykolaiv Oblast
- Governor of Odesa Oblast
- Governor of Poltava Oblast
- Governor of Rivne Oblast
- Governor of Sumy Oblast
- Governor of Ternopil Oblast
- Governor of Vinnytsia Oblast
- Governor of Volyn Oblast
- Governor of Zakarpattia Oblast
- Governor of Zaporizhzhia Oblast
- Governor of Zhytomyr Oblast
- Governor of Sevastopol, temporarily abolished
- Governor of Kyiv, often served by Mayor of Kyiv (for more information, see Kyiv City State Administration)
- Representatives of the President of Ukraine in Crimea
  - Prime Minister of Crimea, temporarily abolished
