= 1802 in Ukraine =

- Decades: 1780s; 1790s; 1800s; 1810s; 1820s
- See also: History of Ukraine; List of years in Ukraine

== Persons ==
=== Born ===
- February 14, Józef Bohdan Zaleski (1802–1886) — Polish poet and public figure.
