= 1794 in Ukraine =

- Decades: 1770s; 1780s; 1790s; 1800s; 1810s
- See also: History of Ukraine; List of years in Ukraine

Events in the year 1794 in Ukraine.

== Establishments ==
- Kalanchak
- Odesa
- Port of Odesa
