= 2008 Yevpatoria gas explosion =

Coordinates: 45.194502°N 33.349487°E

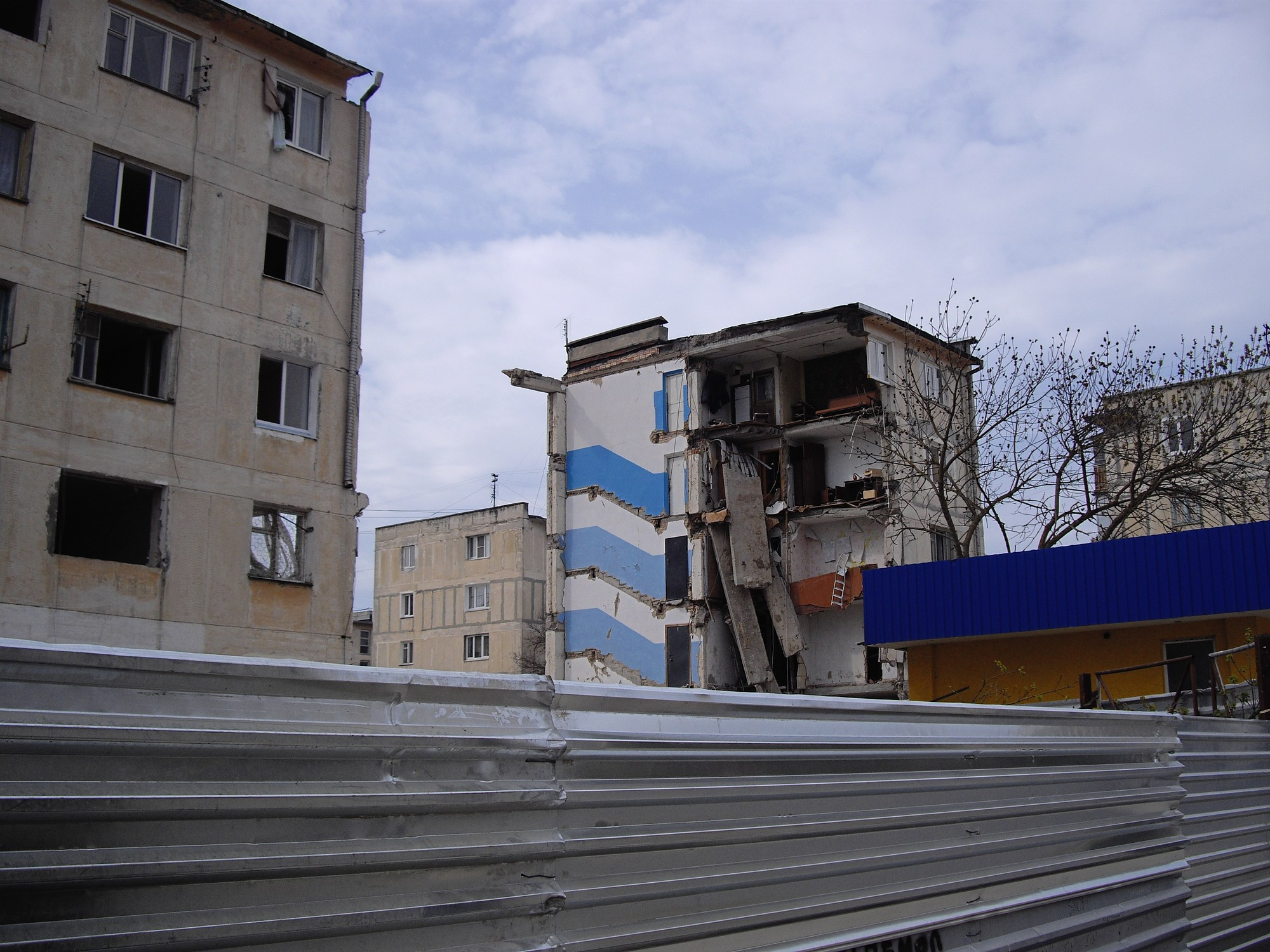
- The apartment block after the explosion
- Date: 24 December 2008
- Location: Yevpatoria, Crimea, Ukraine
- Cause: Gas explosion
- Deaths: 27
- Injuries: 5

The 2008 Yevpatoria gas explosion took place on December 24, 2008, with an explosion in an apartment block in Yevpatoria, a Ukrainian Black Sea resort town. Within hours, the death toll stood at 22 with 10 missing. On December 26 the total number of deaths was 27 people. President Viktor Yushchenko declared December 26 to be a day of national mourning.

== Government reaction ==
On 27 December 2008 the Ukrainian Cabinet of Ministers ordered the central government agencies and the Yevpatoria administration to provide the victims of the blast and the families of those killed with new housing and all financial compensations they are entitled to by January 1, 2009. The Education and Science Ministry has been instructed to make sure that the children from the families who suffered from the incident be provided with free school instruction.

The government also ordered that tougher control measures be taken in the gas supply industry to prevent further accidents.

== Gas explosions trend ==
A similar gas explosion in Dnipropetrovsk in October 2007, killed 23 victims.

Gas explosions in crumbling apartment buildings are often caused by improper use or a poorly maintained infrastructure. They are common occurrences in former Soviet states, particularly in the winter, when residents use more heating.
