= Yuriy Odarchenko =

Ukrainian politician

Yuriy Odarchenko Юрій Одарченко
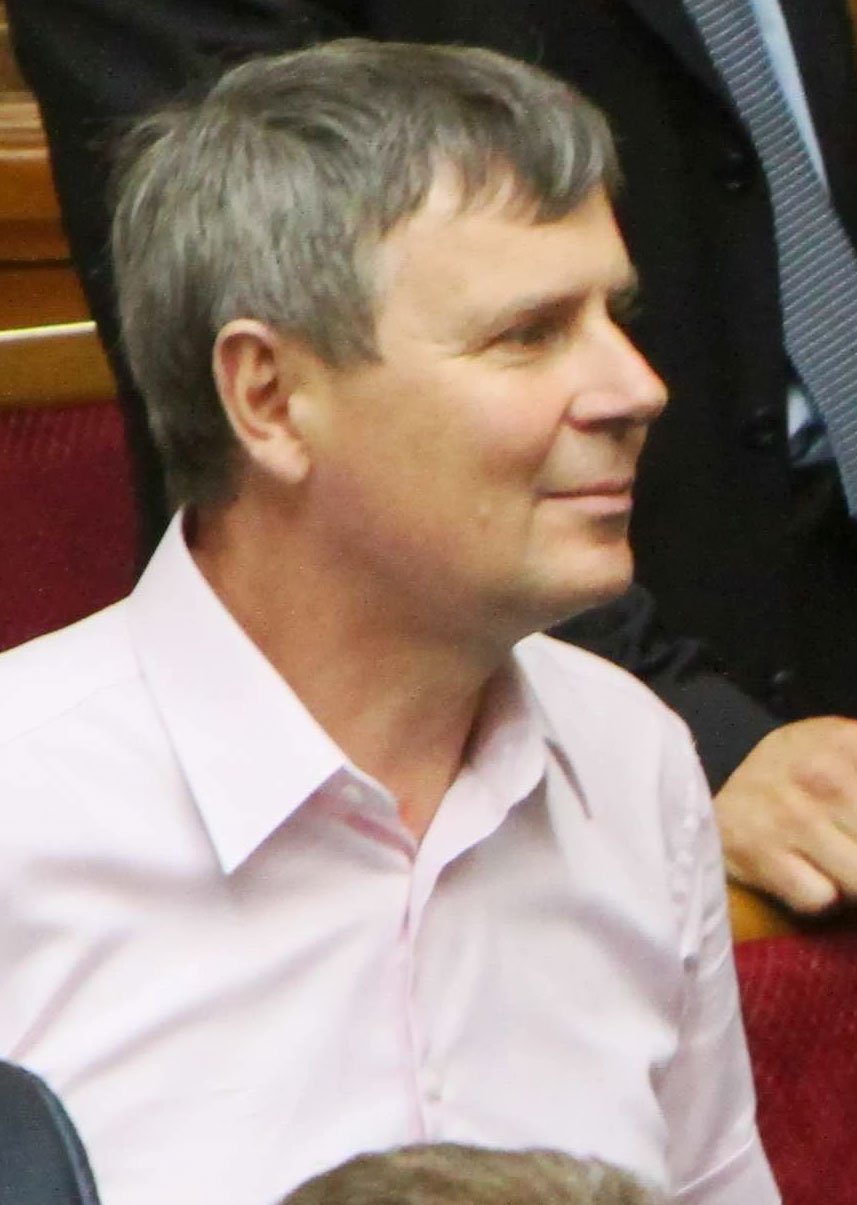

Governor of Kherson Oblast
- In office 2 March 2014 – 27 August 2014
- President: Oleksandr Turchynov (acting)
- Preceded by: Mykola Kostyak
- Succeeded by: Andriy Putilov

Personal details
- Born: Yuriy Vitaliyovych Odarchenko; 5 April 1960 (age 66) Kherson, Ukrainian SSR, Soviet Union
- Party: Batkivshchyna All-Ukrainian Union "Fatherland" party
- Education: Kherson State Agrarian University (PhD in Economics)

Yuriy Vitaliyovych Odarchenko (Ukrainian: Юрій Віталійович Одарченко) (born 5 April 1960) is a Ukrainian politician, member of the Batkivshchyna All-Ukrainian Union party. 2006–2014 he was a member of Ukrainian parliament. On 2 March 2014 Odarchenko was appointed the governor of Kherson Oblast.

== Biography ==
In the 2006 and 2007 Ukrainian parliamentary election Odarchenko was elected to parliament as a candidate of Yulia Tymoshenko Bloc. In the 2012 Ukrainian parliamentary election he was reelected to parliament for Batkivshchyna All-Ukrainian Union party.

On 2 March 2014 Odarchenko was appointed the governor of Kherson Oblast. Odarchenko's gubernal 2014 9 May Victory Day speech caused controversy in its crowd. (Note: On 9 May 2014, the 69th anniversary of Victory Day, Governor Odarchenko held a speech in front of World War II veterans where he questioned the intentions of the communists. Governor Odarchenko also implied that a similar situation exists today in Ukraine’s southeast. The crowd was not amused, and his microphone was snatched and thrown away. According to local news website Khersonskie Vesti, supporters of Ukraine’s Communist Party led the effort to interrupt the speech. Although, Governor Odarchenko was comparing Russia and Fascist Germany, implying that both foreign powers swept through Ukraine, the communists attempts to represent his speech as "pro-Hitler".)

During the 2014 Ukrainian parliamentary election Odarchenko lost in constituency 182 to Oleksandr Spivakovskyy with a minimal difference.

On 27 August 2014 he resigned his position as governor due to disagreements with the new President of Ukraine Petro Poroshenko.

During 17 July 2016 constituency mid-term elections Odarchenko was elected back into the Ukrainian parliament for Batkivshchyna (in constituency 183).

In the 2019 Ukrainian parliamentary election Odarchenko failed to get elected back into the Ukrainian parliament for Batkivshchyna after losing in constituency 182 finishing fourth with 7.32% of the votes.
