= Vitaliy Fedoriv (politician) =

Ukrainian politician

- Віталій Федорів

Governor of Ivano-Frankivsk Oblast
- In office 10 February 2020 (Note: Acting: 10 February – 24 April 2020) – 5 November 2020
- Preceded by: Denys Shmyhal
- Succeeded by: Maria Savka (acting)

Personal details
- Born: Vitaliy Vasylyovych Fedoriv; 23 January 1977 (age 49) Bratkivtsi, Ukrainian SSR, Soviet Union
- Party: Liberty
- Education: Ivano-Frankivsk National Technical University of Oil and Gas
- Occupation: Civil servant; Politician

Vitaliy Vasylyovych Fedoriv (Ukrainian: Віталій Васильович Федорів; born 23 January 1977) is a Ukrainian civil servant and politician, who served as Governor of Ivano-Frankivsk Oblast from April 2020 to November 2020.

== Biography ==
Fedoriv was born on 23 January 1977 in the village of Bratkivtsi, which was located within the Ivano-Frankivsk Oblast within the Ukrainian SSR at the time of his birth. He initially from 1992 to 1995 attended Ivano-Frankivsk Commercial College, before he switched to study at the Ivano-Frankivsk National Technical University of Oil and Gas. Then, from 1995 to 2000, he attended Ivano-Frankivsk National Technical University of Oil and Gas, where he graduated from with a degree in enterprise economics.

After graduation, he worked a variety of jobs within Ivano-Frankivsk. He was first a manager of sales at the company "Ecoproduct" and then at "Gol-Comp". In March 2001, he became a leading economist to the budget planning and analysis department of the Main Financial Department of the Ivano-Frankivsk Regional State Administration, and then was deputy head of said department. From 2002 to 2005 he was then Head of the Department of Financing of Local Authorities, and while working that job he went back to his alma mater and achieved his master's degree in civil service. Continuing to afterwards work within the financial department, he held both the posts of Head of the Non-Production Finance Department and Deputy Head of the Control and Audit Department. Fedoriv then served as Deputy Head of the State Financial Inspection in Ivano-Frankivsk Oblast.

In 2015, he ran for the Ivano-Frankivsk Oblast Council, after being nominated by Volia as a non-partisan candidate, but did not win a seat.

Since November 2018, he was Deputy Governor of Ivano-Frankivsk Oblast. Fedoriv was appointed Governor of Ivano-Frankivsk Oblast on 24 April 2020. He had been acting Governor from 10 February to 24 April 2020. Fedoriv was dismissed by President Volodymyr Zelenskyy on 5 November 2020. He refused to comment the President's sudden decision. Fedoriv was the first governor of Ivano-Frankivsk Oblast not to campaign in elections.
