= 2012 Karavan mall shooting =

Mass shooting in Kyiv, Ukraine

- Location: Karavan; Kyiv, Ukraine
- Date: 26 September 2012
- Attack type: Triple-murder and mass shooting
- Weapon: IZH-79
- Deaths: 3
- Injuries: 1
- Perpetrator: Yaroslav Mazurok

On 26 September 2012, a mass shooting took place at Karavan Shopping Mall mall in Kyiv, Ukraine.

== Events ==
The incident saw suspect Yaroslav Mazurok supposedly taken to the back room of the Karavan Shopping Mall by security guards. At this point, he produced a gun and shot dead three of the security guards, seriously injuring a fourth, before escaping. The entire incident was captured on the mall's closed-circuit television cameras (CCTV camera).

The case become one of the most infamous incidents of gun crime since Ukrainian independence (1991). Mazurok then apparently went on the run for over a month, before his body was found in the woods near Kyiv's Dorohozhychi metro station. The police reported him as being an illegal gunsmith, and a trained assassin, however his family protested his innocence, with his wife claiming he was a labourer, and had been framed.
