= Vasyl Chervoniy =

Ukrainian activist and politician (1958–2009)

- Василь Червоній
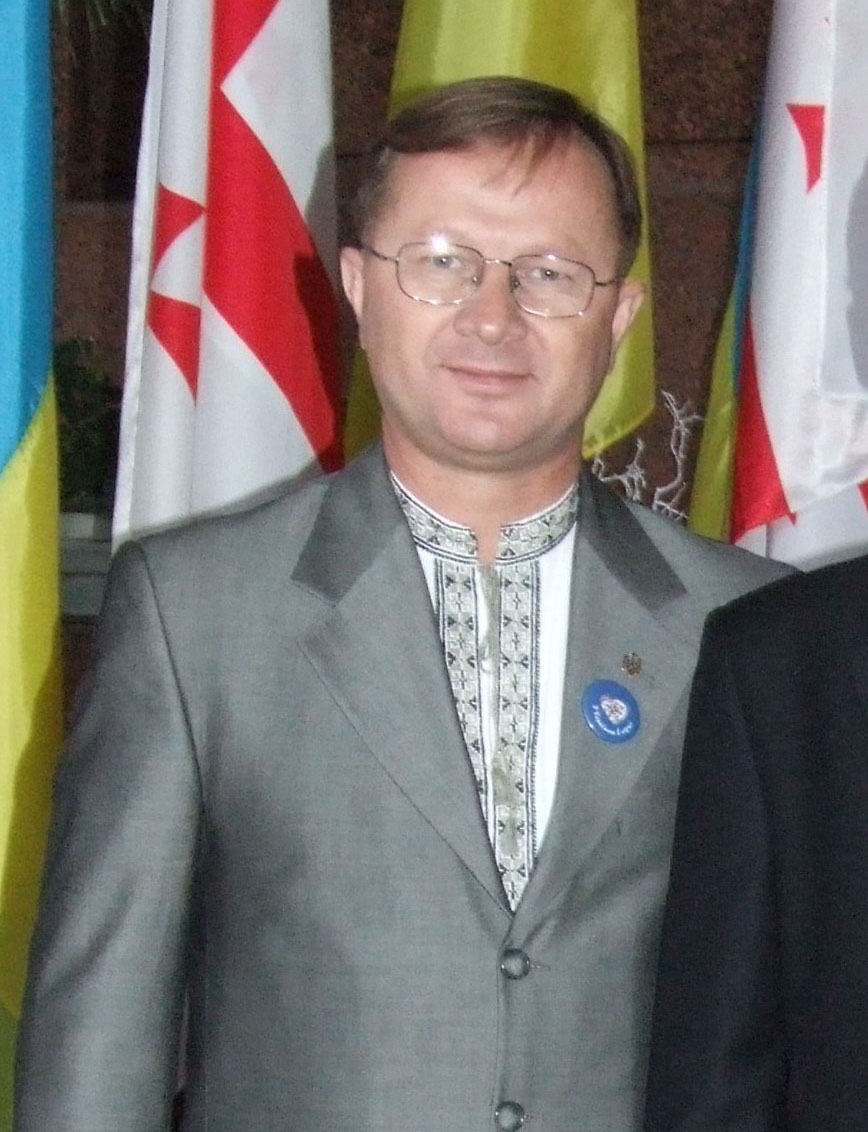

Governor of Rivne Oblast
- In office 4 February 2005 – 15 May 2006
- Preceded by: Mykola Soroka
- Succeeded by: Viktor Matchuk

People's Deputy of Ukraine
- In office 15 May 1990 – 17 March 2005
- Preceded by: Position established (1990); Serhiy Kamenchuk (1994)
- Succeeded by: Leonid Vernyhora (1994); Constituency abolished (1998)
- Constituency: Rivne Oblast, No. 332 (1990–1994); Rivne Oblast, No. 335 (1994–1998); People's Movement of Ukraine, No. 19 (1998–2002); Our Ukraine Bloc, No. 55 (2002–2005)

Personal details
- Born: 17 August 1958 Pohorilivka, Ukrainian SSR, Soviet Union (now Poliske, Ukraine)
- Died: 4 July 2009 (aged 50) Klevan, Ukraine
- Party: People's Movement of Ukraine
- Education: Igor Sikorsky Kyiv Polytechnic Institute
- Awards: Member of the Order of Liberty

Vasyl Mykhailovych Chervoniy (Ukrainian: Василь Михайлович Червоній; 24 August 1958 – 4 July 2009) was a Ukrainian chemical engineer, activist, and politician who served as a People's Deputy of Ukraine from 1990 to 2006, first from various constituencies in Rivne Oblast and then as from proportional party lists. He was a member of the Verkhovna Rada of four convocations.

== Biography ==
Vasyl Chervoniy was born on 24 August 1958 in the village of Pohorilivka, Rivne Oblast. He entered politics in the late 1980s.

From 1981 to 1991, he worked at the factory "Rivne Azot". In 1988, Chervoniy was the first to creat the Shevchenko Society of Ukrainian Language and, in 1989, the first branch of the People's Movement of Ukraine.

From 1990 to 2005 Chervoniy was a People's Deputy of Ukraine. During the Ukraine without Kuchma protests, he was a member of the National Salvation Committee.

From 2005 to 2006, he served as Governor of Rivne Oblast.

In 2008 Chervoniy ran unsuccessfully for mayor of Rivne.

In 2009, near a pond in the village of Derazhne, he was struck by lightning. Chervoniy was taken to the Central Hospital of Rivne Raion in Klevan, where he died.

== Awards ==
Order of Liberty (November 18, 2009, posthumously).
