= Mykola Kostyak =

Mykola Kostyak Микола Костяк

Governor of Kherson Oblast
- In office 18 June 2010 – 2 March 2014
- Preceded by: Anatoliy Hrytsenko
- Succeeded by: Yuriy Odarchenko

Personal details
- Born: Mykola Mykaylovych Kostyak; 1 December 1954 (age 71) Michurine, Ukrainian SSR, Soviet Union
- Party: Party of Regions

Mykola Mykhailovych Kostyak (born December 1, 1954, Michurine village, Donetsk Oblast) is a Ukrainian politician. He was Chief of Local State Administration and Governor of Kherson Oblast. from June 18, 2010 until February 24, 2014, and was a member and head of the regional organization of the Party of Regions.

== Biography ==
Kostyak was born in Michurine village, Telmanivskiy Area in Donetsk Oblast, Ukraine. In 1971 he graduated from the Crimea Agricultural Institute. In 1972 he worked as a member of the kolkhoz named after Telman in Telmanivskiy Area. From 1973-1976 he was in the service of the Armed Forces Of the USSR. From 1981 to 1983 he worked as a hydraulic engineer, later as the main hydraulic engineer and as the main agronomist of the “Hammer and Sickle” kolkhoz in Telmanivskiy Area.

In the 2006 Ukrainian parliamentary election Kostyak unsuccessfully tried to win a seat in Ukraine's parliament for Party of Regions.

From June 18, 2010 until February 24, 2014 Kostyak was Chief of Local State Administration and Governor of Kherson Oblast.

He was awarded the Order of Merit III class, as well as a title of the Honoured Worker of Agriculture of Ukraine.
