= Mykola Kmit =

Ukrainian politician and businessman

- Микола Кміть
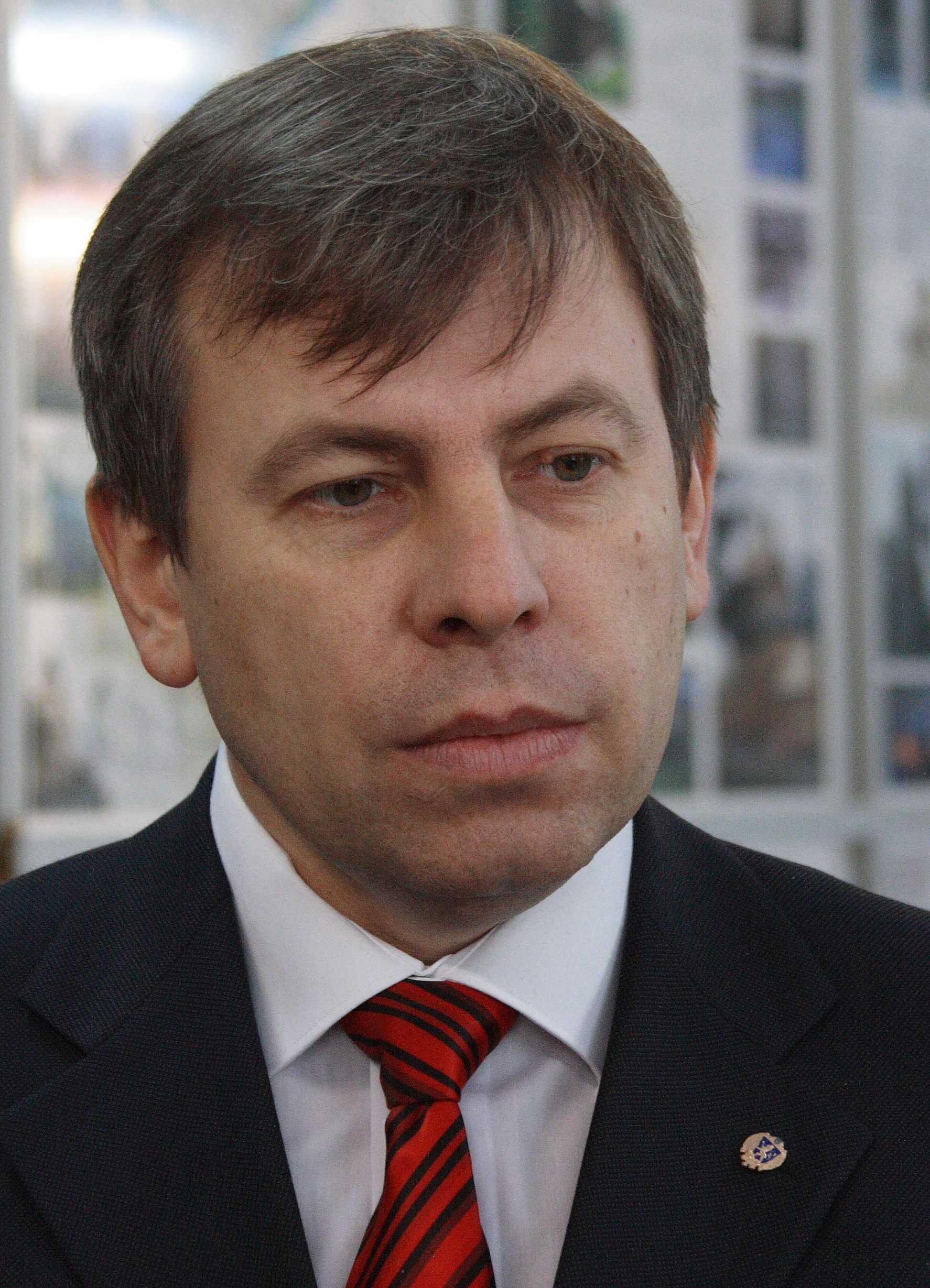

Governor of Lviv Oblast
- In office 1 September 2008 – 21 April 2010
- Preceded by: Valeriy Pyatak (acting)
- Succeeded by: Vasyl Horbal

Personal details
- Born: 24 March 1966 (age 60) Buchach, Ukrainian SSR, Soviet Union (now Ukraine)
- Spouse: Svitlana Kmit
- Children: Dana, Nazar
- Education: Lviv Polytechnic University

Mykola Ivanovych Kmit (Ukrainian: Микола Іванович Кміть; born 24 March 1966) is a Ukrainian politician and the former head of the Lviv Oblast State Administration. He is a president of the Ukrainian football club FC Skala Stryi (originally from Morshyn).

== Business career ==
Kmit is a graduate of the Lviv Polytechnic Institute. Between 1992 and 1995, under Kmit's management, the Invest-Center JSC became a large wholesale supplier of the Ukrainian china and ceramic ware to Russia.

Between 1996 and 2004, Kmit led Nova company specializing in mineral water production and bottling in Morshyn. His leadership resulted in the establishing of the biggest distribution network in Ukraine.

Since 2005 till February 2008, Mykola Kmit is a top-manager, co-owner and strategist of the Industrial and Distribution Systems (IDS). Under his management several new factories were launched and IDS Group became the leader in the Ukrainian mineral water market.

In 2007, Mykola Kmit took 69th place in the TOP-100 best managers in the country, having previously become a finalist in the International Competition Entrepreneur of the Year 2006.

== Political career ==
In February 2008 Mykola Kmit became an acting Head of Lviv Oblast State Administration. By a Decree of President Viktor Yushchenko of September 1, 2008, Mykola Kmit was appointed the Head of Lviv Oblast State Administration. Today Mr. Kmit focuses his efforts on developing the investment potential of Lviv Region and implementation of vital projects, including those related to Euro 2012, for the region's growth and well-being. Kmit was dismissed in April 2010 by President Viktor Yanukovych.

Kmit was the Self Reliance candidate for People's Deputy of Ukraine in Ukraine's 126th electoral district in the 2014 Ukrainian parliamentary election, though he was ultimately not elected.

Kmit was the eighth-place candidate for Self Reliance party list in the 2019 Ukrainian parliamentary election. At the time of the elections, he was an independent. But in the election the party won 1 seat (in one of the electoral constituencies) while only scoring 0.62% of the national (election list) vote.
