= Yuriy Chmyr =

Ukrainian politician

- Юрій Чмирь
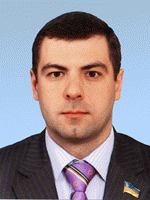
- Official portrait, 2007

Governor of Sumy Oblast
- In office 6 April 2010 – 16 December 2013
- Preceded by: Mykola Lavryk
- Succeeded by: Ihor Yahovdyk

People's Deputy of Ukraine
- In office 25 May 2006 – 6 April 2010
- Constituency: Party of Regions, No. 181 (2006–2007); Party of Regions, No. 202 (2007–2010)

Personal details
- Born: 7 April 1972 (age 54) Makiivka, Ukrainian SSR, Soviet Union (now Ukraine)
- Party: Party of Regions; Revival; Opposition Platform - For Life
- Education: Donetsk National Technical University

Yuriy Pavlovych Chmyr (Ukrainian: Юрій Павлович Чмирь; born 7 April 1972) is a Ukrainian politician who served as Governor of Sumy Oblast from 6 April 2010 to 16 December 2013. He previously served as a People's Deputy of Ukraine from 2006 to 2010. After his tenure as Governor, Chmyr served as Deputy Head of the Presidential Administration of Ukraine (December 2013 — February 2014). Since November 2015, he has been a member of the Sumy Oblast Council for Revival and then the Opposition Platform - For Life party.

== Early life ==
Chmyr was born on 7 April 1972 in Makiivka, which was located within the Donetsk Oblast of the Ukrainian SSR at the time of his birth. In 1994, he graduated from the Donetsk National Technical University with a degree in mechanical engineering. Following this, he was the manager at the trade-industrial enterprise "Donahrobud" until 2000 when he became the manager at the closed joint-stock company "Rosmen", which he became the financial director of in 2002. Up until his election to the Verkhovna Rada in 2006, he was chairman of the board of "AK Svema", a company based in Shostka in Sumy Oblast.

== Legal issues ==
In July 2017, the Prosecutor’s Office of Sumy Oblast notified Chmyr of suspicion under Part 1 of Art. 357, Art. 358, and Art. 366-1 of the Criminal Code. According to investigators, it was alleged following Viktor Yanukovych's departure from Ukraine, Chmyr falsely reported his passport as lost in order to obtain a replacement, and then continued to use the supposedly lost passport for notarial and property-related transactions. Prosecutors alleged that by doing so he concealed assets owrth around 40 million UAH, registering them under his daughter. The case was formally sent to court in August 2017, to which Chmyr denied using his lost passport, calling the case "absurd" and "politics". The case faced significant procedural stalling, however, as no hearings that were scheduled were held between 2017 and 2019 due to Cchmyr and his lawyers absence, and the statute of limitations was set to expire in April 2020.
