= Vasyl Chudnov =

Ukrainian politician

Vasyl Chudnov Василь Чуднов
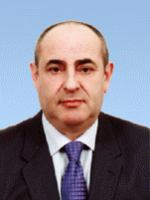

Head of the Ivano-Frankivsk Oblast State Administration
- In office 8 November 2013 – 2 March 2014
- Preceded by: Mykhailo Vyshyvanyuk
- Succeeded by: Andriy Trotsenko

Member of the Verkhovna Rada
- In office 22 March 2010 – 12 December 2012

Personal details
- Born: Vasyl Mykhailovych Chudnov; 14 January 1958 (age 68) Kosmach, Kosiv Raion, Ukrainian SSR
- Party: Party of Regions
- Education: Kamianets-Podilskyi Agrarian Institute

Vasyl Mykhailovych Chudnov (Ukrainian: Василь Михайлович Чуднов; born 14 January 1958) is a Ukrainian politician. In 2013 to 2014, he was a leading figure in the political life of Prykarpattia.

== Early life and career ==
Vasyl Chudnov was born in Kosmach, which was located within the Kosiv Raion of the Ukrainian SSR at the time of his birth. After finishing his secondary education, he worked as a tourism instructor in Yaremche and Sheshory, and then as a workshoper at a collective farm in the Kosiv Raion. Afterwards, he obtained highher education, graduating from the Kamianets-Podilskyi Agrarian Institute with a degree in agricultural mechanization and the qualification of a mechanical engineer.

He was then the foreman and later director of the Kosmach Mechanical Plant until 2001. He was later from 2001 to 2010 president of the forestry-industrial corporation "Halychyna – Lis" and "Halychynabud". Additionally, from 2003 to 2004, he headed the Council of Entrepreneurs and Industrialists under the head of the Ivano-Frankivsk Oblast State Administration.

== Political career ==
He first entered politics in 1990, when he was elected a deputy of the Kosiv Raion Council, which he was elected to again afterwards until his term ended in 1998. He returned to politics in April 2007 when he became Head of the State Environmental Protection Administration for Ivano-Frankivsk Oblast, with his term for that position ending in August 2008.

In 2010–2012 Chudnov was a people's deputy of Ukraine. In 2013-2014 he was a head of the Ivano-Frankivsk Oblast State Administration (Governor of Prykarpattia). Due to mass protests in support for Euromaidan, he resigned.
