= Mykhailo Papiyev =

Ukrainian engineer and politician

- Михайло Папієв
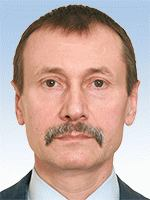
- Official portrait, 2019

People's Deputy of Ukraine
- Incumbent
- Assumed office 27 November 2014
- Constituency: Opposition Bloc, No. 22 (2014–2019); Opposition Platform — For Life, No. 13 (2019–present)
- In office 14 May 2002 – 16 January 2003
- Constituency: Social Democratic Party of Ukraine (united), No. 8

Minister of Labour and Social Policy
- In office 30 November 2002 – 3 February 2005
- Preceded by: Ivan Sakhan
- Succeeded by: Viacheslav Kyrylenko
- In office 4 August 2006 – 18 December 2007
- Preceded by: Ivan Sakhan
- Succeeded by: Lyudmyla Denisova

Governor of Chernivtsi Oblast
- In office 18 March 2010 – 7 March 2014
- Preceded by: Volodymyr Kulish
- Succeeded by: Mykhailo Romaniv

Personal details
- Born: 1 October 1960 (age 66) Zaporizhzhia, Ukrainian SSR, Soviet Union (now Ukraine)
- Party: Platform for Life and Peace (since 2022)
- Other political affiliations: Social Democratic Party of Ukraine (united) (until 2007); Ne Tak (2006); Party of Regions (2007–2014); Opposition Bloc (2014–2019); Opposition Platform — For Life (2019–2022)
- Education: Chernivtsi University

Mykhailo Mykolayovych Papiyev (Ukrainian: Михайло Миколайович Папієв; born 1 October 1960) is a Ukrainian engineer and politician currently serving as a People's Deputy of Ukraine since 2014, previously holding the position in 2002. He is also a former Minister of Labour and Social Policy, serving from 2002 to 2005 and from 2006 to 2007.

In 1990-1997 he worked as a director for various science and production companies. Papiyev has a degree in physics from the Chernivtsi State University and a PhD in economics.

In 2002-2003 Papiyev was a member of the Verkhovna Rada representing the Social Democratic Party of Ukraine (united).

In 2002-2005 he served as a Minister of Labor and Social Policy of Ukraine.

After failing to become elected to Verkhovna Rada in the 2006 Ukrainian parliamentary election with Opposition Bloc "Ne Tak", in 2006-2007 Papiyev served again as Minister of Labor and Social Policy.

In from the 2007 Ukrainian parliamentary election until 2010 he again became a member of the Verkhovna Rada representing the Party of Regions.

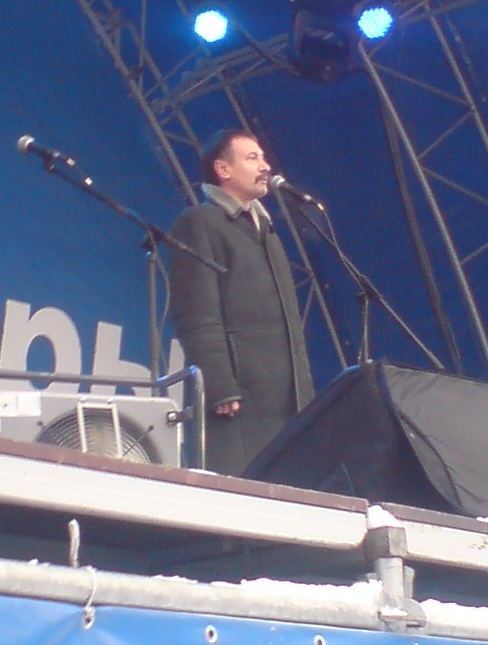
Papiyev in 2010

In 2010-2014 Papiyev served as a Governor of Chernivtsi Oblast.

In the 2014 Ukrainian parliamentary election he again was reelected to Verkhovna Rada as a member of Opposition Bloc.

In the 2019 Ukrainian parliamentary election he again was reelected to Verkhovna Rada as a member of Opposition Platform — For Life.
