= Oleksandr Ledyda =

Ukrainian politician

- Олександр Ледида
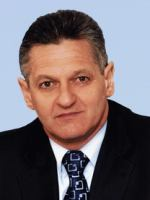

Member of the Zakarpattia Oblast Council
- Incumbent
- Assumed office October 2015

10th Governor of Zakarpattia Oblast
- In office 18 March 2010 – 22 February 2014
- Preceded by: Oleh Havashi
- Succeeded by: Valerii Lunchenko

Member of the Zakarpattia Oblast Council
- In office 2010 – 18 March 2010

Member of the Verkhovna Rada
- In office 25 May 2006 – 23 November 2007

Personal details
- Born: Oleksandr Oleksandrovych Ledyda; 28 September 1957 (age 69) Barvinok, Zakarpattia Oblast, Ukrainian SSR, Soviet Union
- Party: Party of Regions

Oleksandr Oleksandrovych Ledyda (Ukrainian: Олександр Олександрович Ледида; born 28 September 1957) is a Ukrainian politician who served as the 10th Governor of Zakarpattia Oblast from 2010 to 2014.

He had also been a member of the Verkhovna Rada of the 5th convocation from 2006 to 2007.

He had also been a member of the Zakarpattia Oblast Council in 2010.

He is the President of the Karpaty Uzhgorod handball club and the Vice President of the Handball Federation of Ukraine.

== Biography ==
Oleksandr Ledyda was born on 28 September 1957 in the village of Barvinok, Uzhgorod district, Zakarpattia Oblast.

In 1963, he graduated from elementary school in the village of Barvinok.

In 1974, he graduated from high school in Uzhgorod.

He began his career at the Uzhgorod machine-building plant. In 1975, he began working at the plant as a mechanic. At the same time, he studied at the evening department of the Uzhgorod College of Electronic Devices. After completing military service in the army from 1975 to 1977, he continued to work at the Uzhgorod Machine-Building Plant.

In 1980, he graduated from the Uzhgorod Technical School of Electronic Devices.

From 1980 to 1984, he worked in various positions at Krasnoyarskhimles, Yuzhtranstekhmontazh, and Yugozaptransstroy. From 1984 to 1989, he worked as a senior economist at the Bolshevik Uzhgorod furniture factory, and for the next two years, he worked at the Ogonyok cooperative.

In 1989, he graduated from the Faculty of Economics of Uzhgorod State University.

From 1991 to 1998, he was the private enterprise Latex director.

From 2001 to 2002, he was the chairman of the Transcarpathian regional branch of the Union of Entrepreneurs of Small, Medium, and Privatized Enterprises of Ukraine. From 2002 to 2006, he was the chairman of the supervisory board of the Mezhgorsky Timber Plant.

From 1998 to 1999, he served as Deputy Chairman of the Uzhgorod Regional State Administration; from 1999 to 2001, he was Deputy Chairman of the Zarkapattia Regional State Administration. In the 2002 parliamentary elections, Ledyda led the district headquarters of Viktor Yushchenko's Our Ukraine bloc. Since February 2004, he has been chairman of the Zarkapattia regional branch of the Party of Regions.

On 25 May 2006, Ledyda became a member of parliament, a People's Deputy of Ukraine in the Verkhovna Rada of the 5th convocation. He left the parliament on 23 November 2007.

On 18 March 2010, by decree of the President of Ukraine, Viktor Yanukovych, Ledyda was appointed the 10th Governor of Zakarpattia Oblast. During the Euromaidan on 22 February 2014, he wrote a letter of resignation, and on 2 March, he was removed from his post.

In the local elections in October 2010, he was elected as a deputy of the Zakarpattia Oblast Council from the Party of Regions.

In the local elections in October 2015, he was re-elected to the regional council from the "Opposition Bloc." In the local elections in October 2020, he was re-elected as a deputy of the regional council from the party "For the Future."

He has been married since 1995 and has two daughters. He lives in the village of Barvinok, his birthplace.
