= Vasyl Yadukha =

Ukrainian politician

Vasyl Yadukha Василь Степанович Ядуха
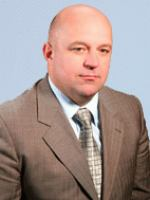

Governor of Khmelnytskyi Oblast
- In office 2010–2014
- Preceded by: Ivan Havchuk
- Succeeded by: Leonid Prus

Personal details
- Born: Vasyl Stepanovych Yadukha; 25 January 1964 (age 62) Verbka-Murovana, Yarmolyntsi Raion, Ukrainian SSR
- Party: Party of Regions
- Education: Podilskyi State Agro-Technical University

Vasyl Stepanovych Yadukha (Ukrainian: Василь Степанович Ядуха; born 25 January 1964) is a Ukrainian politician, former member of the Verkhovna Rada (Ukraine's national parliament).

== Early life ==
Yadukha was born on 25 January 1964 in the village of Verbka-Murovana, which was then part of the Ukrainian SSR in the Soviet Union. In 1986, he graduated from Podilskyi State Agro-Technical University with a specialty as an agronomist. Afterwords, he worked as a chief agronomist and then chairman at a collective farm until the collapse of the Soviet Union. Upon its collapse, in 1992 he became Head of the Department of Agriculture for the Yarmolyntsi Raion council until 1995. After 1995, he worked in various agricultural leadership roles, and by 2002 was Head of the Department for Agriculture of Khmelnytskyi Oblast. In 2005 he started heading the Khmelnytskyi Oblast branch of the Party of Regions, and became commercial director of the agricultural enterprise "Zinkiv" and "Zorianyi Shliakh.

== Political career ==
In 2006-2007 Yadukha was a member of the Verkhovna Rada representing Party of Regions. In the 2007 Ukrainian parliamentary election heo failed to get reelected to parliament as a candidate of the same party.

In 2010-2014 he served as a Governor of Khmelnytskyi Oblast. In this role, he supported reforms by fellow Party of Regions member, Serhiy Hrynevetskyi , that would liquidate the city of Slavuta and would divide Ukraine into eight oblasts. Later, in 2017, the Prosecutor General's Office opened an investigation into whether during his time as governor he received funding from a shadow ledger of the Party of Regions, with accounting entries stated the total was $1.75 million.
