= Vasyl Bertash =

Ukrainian engineer and politician

Vasyl Bertash Василь Берташ
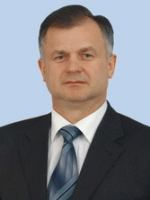

Governor of Rivne Oblast
- In office 18 March 2010 – 2 March 2014
- Preceded by: Ihor Blahodyr (acting)
- Succeeded by: Serhiy Rybachok

Member of the Verkhovna Rada
- In office April 2006 – November 2007

Personal details
- Born: Vasyl Mykhailovych Bertash; 7 January 1961 (age 65) Rokytne, Rivne Oblast, Ukrainian SSR
- Party: Party of Regions
- Education: National University of Water and Nature Management

Vasyl Mykhailovych Bertash (Ukrainian: Василь Михайлович Берташ; born 7 January 1961, in Rokytne, Ukraine) is a Ukrainian construction engineer and later politician, member of the Verkhovna Rada.

== Early years ==
Bertash was born onn 7 January 1961 in Rokytne, which was then part of the Ukrainian SSR in the Soviet Union at the time of his birth. In 1980 he graduated from Rivne Agricultural College while working at the Myrgoshchansky State Farm Technical School in Dubno and then at the Gorky collective farm in Lutsk. He pursued a postgraduate education, and in 1985 he also graduated from the Ukrainian Institute of Water Engineers with a degree in civil engineering.

After graduating, he returned to the Gorky collective farm in Lutsk then went to the Klevan Industrial Plant in Rivne. From 1987 to 1998 he was then General Director of the enterprise "Rembudmontazh". In addition, from 1992–1998, he was CEO of Polish-Ukrainian company REMROL.

== Politics ==
From 1998–2005, he worked at the Rivne Oblast State Administration, heading the regional construction department. He was deputy of the Oblast Council in 2002–2006.

From 2006–2007, Bertash was a member of the Verkhovna Rada representing the Party of Regions. From 2010–2014, he served as a Governor of Rivne Oblast. In 2023, he was a deputy of the Rivne Oblast Council.

== Awards ==
- Honored Builder of Ukraine (December 2000).
- Order of Merit of the 3rd degree (April 2002), 2nd degree (January 2011), 1st degree (January 2013); for a significant personal contribution to state building, socio-economic development of the Rivne region, many years of conscientious work and high professionalism.
- International Order of the Smile (2003).
- Certificate of Honor of the Cabinet of Ministers of Ukraine (April 2004).
- Doctor of Philosophy in the field of public administration.

== Hobbies ==
Vasyl Bertash is the president of the Rivne public organization "Billiards Sports Association".

Other hobbies: sports, hunting, fishing.

== Family ==
He is married. His son Myroslav was born in 1981. His son was involved in a court case that later went to the European Court of Human Rights after a woman was convicted for stating that she saw Bertash's son exit the driver's side of a car involved in a 2008 accident, with the ECHR ruling that Ukraine had violated Article 10 of the European Convention on Human Rights by convicting her.
