= Valeriy Asadchev =

Ukrainian politician

- Валерій Асадчев
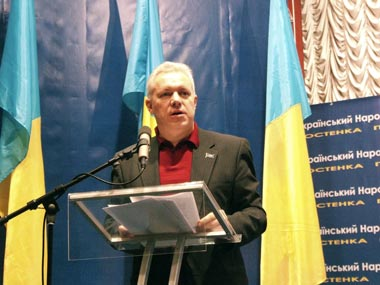

Governor of Poltava Oblast
- In office 26 May 2006 – 26 March 2010
- President: Viktor Yushchenko
- Preceded by: Stepan Bulba
- Succeeded by: Oleksandr Udovidenko

People's Deputy of Ukraine
- In office 29 March 1998 – 26 May 2006
- Preceded by: Oleksandr Slobodian (2002)
- Succeeded by: Constituency abolished
- Constituency: People's Movement of Ukraine, No. 37 (1998–2002); Kyiv, No. 220 (2002–2006)

Personal details
- Born: 14 July 1953 (age 73) Kyiv, Ukrainian SSR, Soviet Union (now Ukraine)
- Party: Ukrainian People's Party
- Other political affiliations: People's Movement of Ukraine (until 2000); Our Ukraine–People's Self-Defense Bloc
- Education: Kyiv Polytechnic Institute; Taras Shevchenko National University of Kyiv

Valeriy Mykhailovych Asadchev (Ukrainian: Валерій Михайлович Асадчев; born 14 July 1953) is a Ukrainian politician and engineering technologist who served as Governor of Poltava Oblast from 2006 to 2010. He was previously a People's Deputy of Ukraine from 1998 to 2006, elected from the proportional list of the People's Movement of Ukraine and Kyiv's Podilskyi District.

== Early life ==
Valeriy Asadchev was born on 14 July 1953, in Kyiv. In 1977, he graduated from the Kyiv Polytechnic Institute as a technological engineer and from the Ukrainian National Tchaikovsky Academy of Music as a choir conductor. He attained another degree from the Taras Shevchenko National University of Kyiv in 2003.

== Political career ==
Asadchev was first elected to the Verkhovna Rada (Ukrainian parliament) in the 1998 Ukrainian parliamentary election, when he was elected as the 37th candidate on the proportional-representative list of the People's Movement of Ukraine. Following a split in the party, he joined the Ukrainian People's Party. He was chairman of the Subcommittee on the Budget of the Autonomous Republic of Crimea. During this time, he was among those who expressed opposition to the privatisation of land, arguing that "We cannot allow a dozen latifundists to be formed in Ukraine, and for the entire nation to become farm servants."

In the 2002 Ukrainian parliamentary election Asadchev was re-elected, this time from the 220th electoral district in Kyiv. He was elected as a member of the Our Ukraine Bloc, though he retained his membership in the Ukrainian People's Party. Within the Verkhovna Rada he was deputy chairman of the Verkhovna Rada Budget Committee.

On 26 May 2006, President Viktor Yushchenko appointed Asadchev as the head of the Poltava Regional State Administration. At the time, he was a member of the Ukrainian People's Party. He held the post until 26 March 2010.
