= Viktor Matchuk =

Ukrainian politician (born 1959)

Viktor Matchuk Віктор Матчук
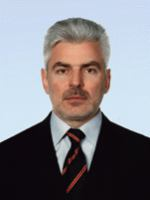

Member of the Verkhovna Rada
- In office 12 February 2010 – 3 July 2012

Governor of Rivne Oblast
- In office 18 May 2006 – 12 February 2010
- Preceded by: Vasyl Chervoniy
- Succeeded by: Yuriy Blahodyr (acting)

Personal details
- Born: Viktor Yosypovych Matchuk; 5 June 1959 (age 67) Rivne, Ukrainian SSR
- Party: Our Ukraine
- Education: Igor Sikorsky Kyiv Polytechnic Institute

Viktor Yosypovych Matchuk (Ukrainian: Віктор Йосипович Матчук; born 5 June 1959) is a Ukrainian electrical engineer and later politician, member of the Verkhovna Rada.

== Early life ==
Matchuk was born on 5 June 1959 in Rivne, which was then part of the Ukrainian SSR in the Soviet Union. In 1982, he graduated from the Kyiv Polytechnic Institute (KPI) with a spepcialty in industrial electronics, thus qualifying him for the job of an engineer. He then worked as a controller of radio equipment at the "Radiopribor" plant in Kyiv, before returning to study as a postgraduate student at KPI, where he earned his Candidate of Technical Sciences degree in 1986, simultaneously working as a junior research associate at the time at KPI.

Following this, he worked as the head of the design bureau for the Rivne Radio Engineering Plant and a part-time lecturer at the Ukrainian Institute of Water Management Engineers before switching to business in 1990. He first worked as director of the "Vostok-Prohama" enterprise in Rivne, and then from 1992-2006 he worked as a director at the "Renome" company.

== Political career ==
From 1998 to 2002 he served as a deputy on the Rivne City Council, chairing the budget and finance committee. Then, from 2002 to 2010, he served as a deputy on the Rivne Oblast Council, where he was head of the "Our Ukraine" faction.

Fromm January to May 2006, he was head of the Rivne city organization for Our Ukraine. Then, from 2006-2010, Matchuk served as a Governor of Rivne Oblast. In 2010-2012 he was a member of the Verkhovna Rada representing Our Ukraine.
