= Mykola Lavryk =

- Микола Лаврик
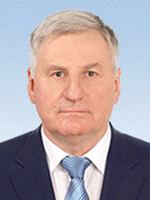
- Official portrait, 2014

Member of the Verkhovna Rada
- In office 27 November 2014 – 29 August 2019

9th Governor of Sumy Oblast
- In office 19 February 2009 – 6 April 2010
- Preceded by: Pavlo Kachur
- Succeeded by: Yuriy Chmyr

Governor of Sumy Oblast (acting)
- In office 7 April 2008 – 19 February 2009

Governor of Chernihiv Oblast
- In office 12 December 2005 – 10 July 2007
- Preceded by: Vladyslav Atroshenko
- Succeeded by: Volodymyr Khomenko

5th Governor of Sumy Oblast
- In office 4 February 2005 – 12 December 2005
- Preceded by: Volodymyr Shcherban
- Succeeded by: Nina Harkava

Personal details
- Born: Mykola Ivanovych Lavryk; 30 May 1952 (age 73) Korovyntsi, Ukrainian SSR, Soviet Union (now Ukraine)
- Party: European Solidarity

Mykola Ivanovych Lavryk (Ukrainian: Микола Іванович Лаврик; born on 30 June 1952), is a Ukrainian politician who last served as the Member of the Verkhovna Rada from 2014 to 2019.

He also served as the Governor of Sumy Oblast from 2008 to 2010, having already served in his first term in 2005. He was also the Governor of Chernihiv Oblast, having served from 2005 to 2007.

== Biography ==
Mykola Lavryk was born on 30 June 1952.

In September 1971, he was a hydraulic worker, machinist of the Balakhiv coal section of the "Olexandriaugill" combine.

In July 1972, he was a foreman of the Plavynyshchiv inter-collective brick factory of the Romen district.

In October 1972, he was a foreman of the Dyukinsky quarry for the extraction of limestone and crushed stone of the Sudogodsky quarry management of the Vladimir region. At the same time, he served in the Soviet Army until November 1974. A month later after serving the army, he was the master of Sudogod career management in December.

From January 1975 to July 1981, he was a mechanic of the production site, head of the workshop of the Verkhnyodniprovsky career management of VO "Dnipronerudprom".

From July 1981 to August 1982, he was the foreman, acting of the senior foreman of Romensky SBU No. 29.

From August 1982 to April 1983, he was the senior engineer of the Department of Production and Technical Equipment of the "Kharkivshlyahbud" trust at Romenskyi SBU No. 29.

From April 1983 to March 1986, he was the deputy director for commercial issues of Romensk shoe factory No. 5.

From April 1986 to July 1987, he was promoted to the Head of the Romenske SBU No. 29 of the Kharkiv Road Construction Trust.

Between July 1987 and 1994, he was promoted to the Director of the Romen Shoe Factory. In 1988, he graduated from Rome Industrial Technical School and Kharkiv State University, as an economist, "Finance and Credit".

In 1994, he was promoted to the general director of the Romen collective footwear enterprise, and in 1997, he was part of the Talan production and trade association.

In October 2000, Lavyrk was the first deputy mayor of Romensk. In December 2003, he left office as he was the chairman of the board of directors, vice-president of "Talan" LLC, Romny.

On 4 February 2005, Lavryk became the 5th Governor of Sumy Oblast. On 12 December, he became Governor of Chernihiv Oblast.

On 25 May 2007, he has been a member National Security and Defense Council of Ukraine.

On 10 July 2007, he left office, and thus left as member of the aNational Security and Defense Council the day later. On 20 September, he was appointed as the adviser President Viktor Yushchenko.

On 7 April 2008, Lavyrk became the acting Governor of Sumy Oblast, before formally taking office on 19 February 2009.

On 6 April 2010, he was dismissed by President Viktor Yanukovych.

On 30 October 2014, Lavyrk was elected a member of parliament, People's Deputy of Ukraine of the 8th convocation. He was sworn in to office on 27 November, and joined the parliamentary faction of the Petro Poroshenko Bloc "Solidarity" party.

He was a member of the Committee of the Verkhovna Rada on Tax and Customs Policy.

He was the head of the group on inter-parliamentary relations with Turkmenistan, and was the secretary of the group on inter-parliamentary relations with Iran.

He was the member of the group on inter-parliamentary relations with Morocco, Saudi Arabia, Kazakhstan, and China.

Based on the data of the 2019 analysts of IA "Slovo i Dilo" during his tenure as member of the Verkhovna Rada, Lavryk was unable to fulfill his promises, and thus not reelected to parliament.

== Family ==
He was married and has a daughter.
