= Volodymyr Kulish =

Ukrainian politician

- Володимир Куліш

Governor of Chernivtsi Oblast
- In office 17 May 2006 – 18 March 2010
- Preceded by: Mykola Tkach
- Succeeded by: Mykhailo Papiyev

Presidential representative of Ukraine in Crimea
- In office 30 December 2004 – 17 May 2006
- Preceded by: Oleksandr Didenko
- Succeeded by: Hennadiy Moskal

Personal details
- Born: 11 February 1963 (age 63) Khotin, Ukrainian SSR, Soviet Union (now Ukraine)
- Party: Our Ukraine
- Education: Kyiv University

Volodymyr Ivanovych Kulish (Ukrainian: Володимир Іванович Куліш; born 11 February 1963) is a Ukrainian politician. He served as the Governor of Chernivtsi Oblast from 2006 to 2010. In 2005-06 he served as a Presidential representative of Ukraine in Crimea.

== Early life ==
Kulish was born on 11 February 1963 in Khotin, which was then part of the Ukrainian SSR in the Soviet Union. In 1985, he graduated from the Faculty of Economics of Kyiv University, receiving the specialty of economist and qualifying him to teach economics. Afterwards, he worked as a lecturer in the Department of Political Economy at Chernivtsi University, but switched paths in 1987 to politics.

== Political career ==
In 1987, he started working for the Komsomol in Chernivtsi, and achieved his Candidate off Economic Sciences degree from Kyiv University also in 1991. In 1992 he became Deputy Chairman of the Chernivtsi City Executive Committee after the collapse of the Soviet Union. In addition, at the time, he was a professor in the Department of Economic Theory at Kyiv University, and after the end of his deputy chairmanship in 1993 he became a senior researcher at the Chernivtsi Branch of the Institute of World Economy and International Relations of the Academy of Sciences of Ukraine. From 1996 to 1997 he then served as Advisor to the Head of the Chernivtsi Regional State Administration. From 1998 he was a Deputy of the Chernivtsi City Council, chairing the Committee on Finance and Budget.

In 1999, he moved to Crimea and became Deputy General Director of the Crimean State JSC "Titan". From 2003 to 2005 he was then Minister of Economy of AR Crimea, and then from 2005 to 2006 Presidential representative of Ukraine in Crimea. He returned to Chernivtsi in 2006 to become Governor of Chernivtsi Oblast, which he did until 2010.
