= Governor of Ivano-Frankivsk Oblast =

Chief executive of Ivano-Frankivsk Oblast, Ukraine

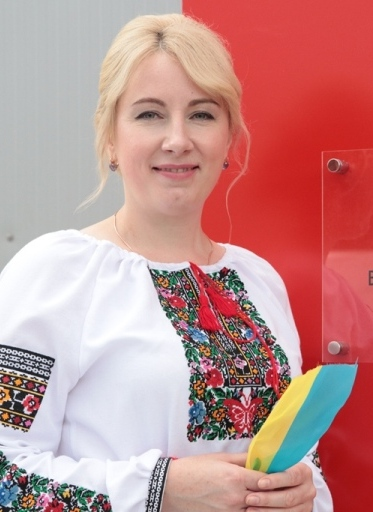
- Incumbent; Svitlana Onyshchuk since 8 July 2021
- Residence: Ivano-Frankivsk
- Inaugural holder: Vasyl Pavlyk
- Formation: March 20, 1992 as Presidential representative of Ukraine
- Website: Government of Ivano-Frankivsk Oblast

The governor of Ivano-Frankivsk Oblast is the head of executive branch for the Ivano-Frankivsk Oblast.

The office of governor is an appointed position, with officeholders being appointed by the president of Ukraine, on recommendation from the Prime Minister of Ukraine.

The official residence for the governor is located in Ivano-Frankivsk. President Volodymyr Zelenskyy appointed Svitlana Onyshchuk as governor on 8 July 2021. Located at: 21 Hrushevskoho St., Ivano-Frankivsk, Ukraine.

== List of heads of government in Ivano-Frankivsk Oblast and Stanislawow Voivodeship ==
This provides a summary of people who were in charge of the regional government in the lands of the former Stanislawow Voivodeship and the today's Ivano-Frankivsk Oblast.

=== Voivodes (Second Polish Republic) ===
- Edmund Jurystowski: 21 October 1921 – 18 August 1925
- Aleksander Des Loges: 18 August 1925 – 25 October 1926
- pl:Władysław Korsak: 18 December 1926 – 12 September 1927
- pl:Aleksander Morawski: 28 October 1927 – 30 October 1928
- pl:Bronisław Nakoniecznikow-Klukowski: 30 October 1928 – 29 August 1930
- pl:Zygmunt Jagodziński: 3 September 1930 – 1 February 1936 (acting till 2 February 1931)
- pl:Mieczysław Starzyński: 11 February 1936 – 22 June 1936 (acting )
- Jan Sawicki: 23 June 1936 – July 1936
- pl:Stefan Pasławski: 14 July 1936 – 20 January 1939
- pl:Stanisław Jarecki: 20 January 1939 – 2 September 1939

=== Regional government (Ukrainian SSR) ===
==== Chairmen of Executive Committee ====
Term start	Term end	Full name with patronym	Date of birth
Oct. 1939	November 1939	Mykhailo Vasyliovych Hrulenko	(b. 1904)
November 1939	1945	Maksym Maksymovych Kozenko	(b. 1905)
1945	1946	Ivan Ivanovych Ryasychenko
1946	1949	Pylyp Kuzmych Shcherbak	(b. 1907)
1949	unknown	Yukhym Nykyforovych Kobzin	(b. 1904)
1952	1955	Yuri Yosypovych Pantelyuk
1956	1977	Petro Fedorovych Kaykan
1980	1990	Vadym Oleksandrovych Boychuk
April 1990	10 September 1990	Dmytro Vasyliovych Zakharchuk	(b. 1940)
Oct. 1990	Jan. 1991	Vasyl Ostapovych Pavlyk	(b. 1938)
Jan. 1991	Mar. 1992	Mykola Mykhailovych Yakovyna	(b. 1957)

==== First secretary of the Party ====
Term start	Term end	Full name with patronym	Date of birth
27 November 1939	4 August 1941	Mykhailo Vasyliovych Hurlenko	(b. 1904)
1944	1949	Mykhailo Varnayevych Slon	(b. 1906)
1949	January 1950	Pylyp Kuzmych Shcherbak	(b. 1907)
January 1950	1951	Mykhailo Varnayevych Slon	(b. 1906)
1951	June 1959	Pylyp Kuzmych Shcherbak	(b. 1907)
June 1959	1963	Yakiv Ivanovych Lysenko	(b. 1906)
1963	August 1963	(acting) Ivan Kashcheyev	(b. 1911)
August 1963	February 1966	Ivan Andreyevich Kashcheyev	(b. 1911)
February 1966	March 1969	Yakiv Petrovych Pohrebnyak	(b. 1928)
March 1969	November 1973	Viktor Fedorovych Dobryk	(b. 1927)
November 1973	1978	Pavlo Fedorovych Bezruk	(b. 1925)
1978	22 December 1983	Ivan Ivanovych Skyba	(b. 1937)
22 December 1983	December 1985	Ivan Andriyovych Lyakhov	(b. 1936)
December 1985	9 February 1990	Ivan Hryhorovych Postoronko	(b. 1929)
9 February 1990	26 August 1991	Zinoviy Vasyliovych Kuravsky	(b. 1944)

=== Regional government (Ukraine) ===
==== Chief of Regional State Administration ====
Term start	Term end	Full name with patronym	Date of birth	Party affiliation	Notes
20 March 1992	Jun. 1994	Vasyl Ostapovych Pavlyk	(b. 1938)		as Presidential Representative
June 1994	26 February 1997	Stepan Vasyliovych Volkovetsky	(s.a.)	DPU	as Chairman of Executive Committee (until 10 July 1995)
26 February 1997	19 January 2005	Mykhailo Vasyliovych Vyshyvanyuk	(b. 1952)	Agrarian Party
4 February 2005	22 October 2007	Roman Volodymyrovych Tkach	(b. 1962)	Rukh
22 October 2007	26 March 2010	Mykola Vasyliovych Paliychuk	(b. 1971)	Rukh
26 March 2010	current	Mykhailo Vasyliovych Vyshyvaniuk	(b. 1952, Kolomyia Raion)	People's Party

==== Chairman of council ====
Term start	Term end	Full name with patronym	Date of birth	Party affiliation	Notes
April 1990	December 1992	Mykola Mykhailovych Yakovyna	(b. 1957)	independent
December 1992	March 1998	Stepan Vasyliovych Volkovetsky	(s.a.)	DPU	as Chairman of Executive Committee (until 10 July 1995)
May 1998	April 2002	Zinoviy Mytnyk
April 2002	March 2006	Vasyl Brus
March 2006	November 2010	Ihor Oliynyk		Our Ukraine	from Rukh
November 2010	current	Oleksandr Sych		Svoboda

=== Regional leaders of the Soviet State Security services ===
Term	Rank	Name	Dates of birth & death	Native city/ village	Previous Assignment	Following Assignment
6 November 1939 – 4 December 1939	COL	Serhiy Savchenko	(1904–1966)	Skadovsk	Chief of 5th Department of Border Troops NKVD	Chief of 5th Department of Border Troops NKVD
4 December 1939 – Jul. 1941	CPT	Oleksiy Mykhailov	(1905–?)	Luhansk	Chief of Kamyanets-Podilsky Oblast NKVD	Chief of Special Department of NKVD (38th Soviet Army) (WWII)
Mar. 1944 – Aug. 1946	COL	Oleksiy Mykhailov	(1905–?)	Luhansk	Deputy of Narkom NKVD in Uzbek SSR	Chief of Voroshylovhrad Oblast Directorate of local industry
20 August 1946 – Sep. 1947 acting	COL	Roman Krutov	(1903–1987)	Saratov	Chief of NKVD of Osh Oblast (Kyrgyz SSR)	Deputy Chief of NKVD in Staline Oblast
1947–1950	COL	Roman Sarayev	(1903–1973)	unknown	Chief of "2N" Directorate of MGB	Chief of MGB in Kyiv Oblast
1950–1951	COL	Volodymyr Shevchenko	(1912–1980)	Kyiv	Chief of MGB in Rivne Oblast	Deputy Minister of MGB
1951–1953	COL	Arseniy Kostenko	(1900–?)	Okhtyrka	Chief of "2N" Directorate of MGB	unknown
1954–1957	COL	Arseniy Kostenko	(1900–?)	Okhtyrka	unknown	unknown
1957 – ?	COL	Mykola Poluden	(1921–2006)	unknown	unknown	Chief of KGB in Ternopil Oblast
1960	COL	Volodymyr Fesenko	(1918–?)	unknown	Chief of KGB in Cherkasy Oblast	Chief of KGB in Crimea Oblast
Feb. 1965 – Dec. 1970	unknown	Vasyl Halda	(1923–?)	Haldivka (Kharkov)	Deputy Chief of KGB in Volyn Oblast	Chief of KGB in Kherson Oblast
? – 1972	GEN	Vasyl Kapatsyn	?	unknown	unknown	unknown
1986	GEN	Ivan Levenko	?	unknown	unknown	unknown

== Governors ==
=== Representative of the President ===
- 1992–1994: Vasyl Pavlyk

=== Chairman of the Executive Committee ===
- 1994–1995: Stepan Volkovetsky

=== Heads of the Administration ===
- 1995–1997: Stepan Volkovetsky
- 1997–2005: Mykhailo Vyshyvanyuk
- 2005–2007: Roman Tkach
- 2007–2010: Mykola Paliychuk
- 2010–2013: Mykhailo Vyshyvanyuk
- 2013–2014: Vasyl Chudnov
- 2014: Andriy Trotsenko
- 2014–2019: Oleh Honcharuk
- 2019: Maria Savka (acting)
- 2019–2020: Denys Shmyhal
- 2020: Vitaliy Fedoriv
- 2020: Maria Savka (Acting)
- 2020–2021: Andriy Boychuk
- 2021–present: Svitlana Onyshchuk
