= Volodymyr Khomenko =

Ukrainian politician

- Володимир Хоменко
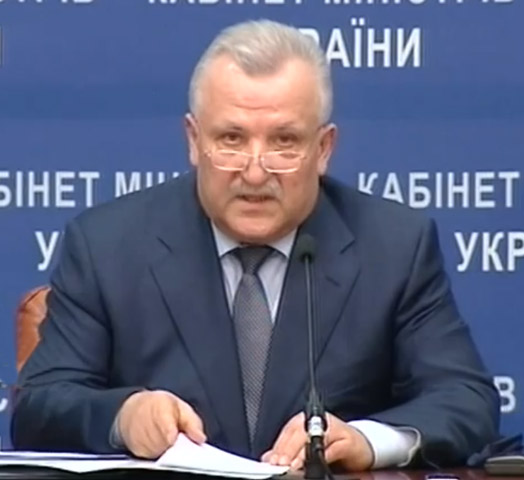
- Khomenko in 2014

Presidential representative of Ukraine in Crimea
- In office 2007–2007
- Preceded by: Viktor Shemchuk
- Succeeded by: Leonid Zhunko

Personal details
- Born: 26 July 1954 (age 72) Cheremoshne, Pohrebyshche Raion, Ukrainian SSR
- Party: Non-partisan
- Education: Kyiv Automobile-Road Institute

Volodymyr Petrovych Khomenko (Ukrainian: Володимир Петрович Хоменко; born 26 July 1954) is a Ukrainian politician.

== Early life ==
Khomenko was born on 26 July 1954 in Cheremoshne, which was then part of the Ukrainian SSR of the Soviet Union. He graduated from the kyiv Automobile Road-Institute, receiving the specialty of engineer-economist. He then began his work in the MVS as an inspector in the Luhansk Oblast within the BKhSS, which he worked as until he graduated from the Academy of the Ministry of Internal Affairs of the USSR with a specialty as a lawyer. He then transferred to working in the MVS within Kyiv in 1986 working as an operative officer, and by 1989 was in a leadership position in the MVS Directorate in the Chernivtsi Oblast.

In 1997, he was appointed Head of the Tax Police Department of the State Tax Administration in Chernivtsi Oblast, and simultaneously as First Deputy Head of the State Tax Administration within the oblast. In 1998, he was transferred to AR Crimea to work the same positions there as in Chernivtsi. In 2003, he was appointed Head of the Tax Militia Directorate of the DPA in Sevastopol, and in 2005 as Head of the Main Directorate of the MVS in AR Crimea. From 2002 to 2006 he also served as a People's Deputy of Ukraine in the Verkhovna Rada, representing a district within AR Crimea.

In 2007 he served as a Presidential representative of Ukraine in Crimea. Afterwards, from 2007 to 2009, he was Deputy Minister of Internal Affairs of Ukraine. In March 2014, he was made Deputy Minister of Revenues and Duties, and on 6 June 2014 as First Deputy Head of the State Fiscal Service of Ukraine.
