= Governor of Rivne Oblast =

Chief executive of Rivne Oblast, Ukraine

- Seal of Rivne Oblast
- Incumbent; Oleksandr Koval since 28 December 2023
- Residence: Rivne
- Term length: Four years
- Inaugural holder: Roman Vasylyshyn; 1992–1994
- Formation: 1992 as Presidential representative
- Website: Government of Rivne Oblast

The governor of Rivne Oblast is the head of executive branch for the Rivne Oblast.

The office of governor is an appointed position, with officeholders being appointed by the president of Ukraine, on recommendation from the prime minister of Ukraine, to serve four-year term.

The official residence for the governor is located in Rivne.

== Governors ==
- Roman Vasylyshyn (1992–1994, as the Presidential representative)
- Roman Vasylyshyn (1995–1997, as the Governor)
- Mykola Soroka (1997–2005)
- Vasyl Chervoniy (2005–2006)
- Viktor Matchuk (2006–2010)
- Yuriy Blahodyr (2010, acting)
- Vasyl Bertash (2010–2014)
- Serhiy Rybachok (2014)
- Yuriy Pryvarskyi (2014, acting)
- Vitaliy Chuhunnikov (2014–2016)
- Oleksiy Mulyarenko (2016–2019)
- Ihor Tymoshenko (2019, acting)
- Vitaliy Koval (2019–2023)
- Serhiy Podolin (acting) (2023)
- Oleksandr Koval (2023–incumbent)

== Sources ==
- World Statesmen.org
