= Governor of Zakarpattia Oblast =

Chief executive of Zakarpattia Oblast, Ukraine

Head of military administration of Zakarpattia Oblast
- Закарпатська обласна державна адміністрація

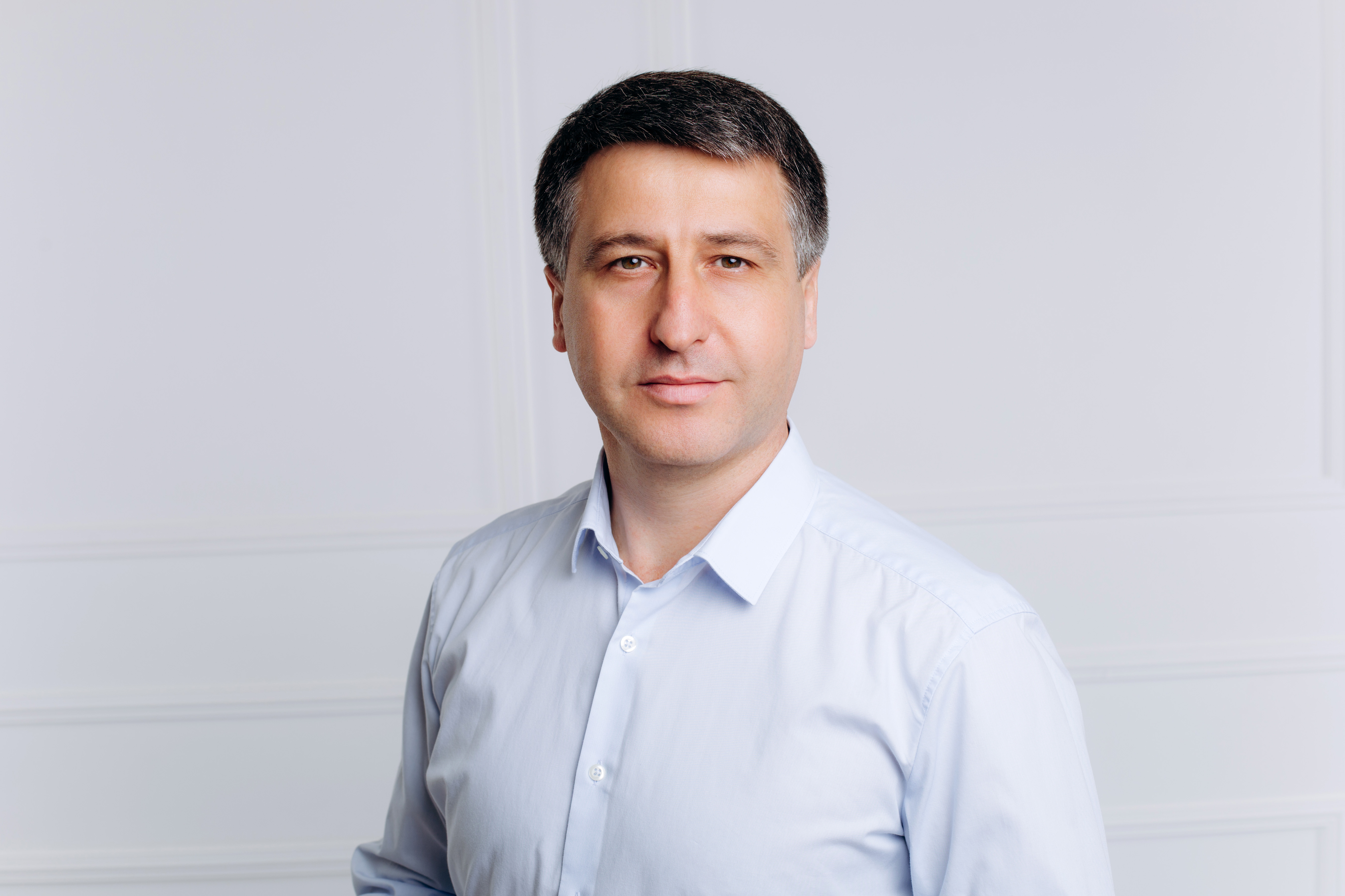
- Incumbent; Myroslav Biletskyi since 9 September 2024
- Residence: Uzhhorod
- Term length: four years
- Inaugural holder: Mykhailo Krailo
- Formation: March 24, 1992 as Presidential representative of Ukraine
- Website: Government of Zakarpattia Oblast

The governor of Zakarpattia Oblast (Ukrainian: Закарпатська обласна державна адміністрація, romanized: Zakarpats'ka oblasna derzhavna administratsiya) is the head of executive branch for the Zakarpattia Oblast.

The office of governor is an appointed position, with officeholders being appointed by the president of Ukraine, on recommendation from the prime minister of Ukraine.

The official residence for the governor is located in Uzhhorod.

== Governors ==
=== Representative of the President ===
- 1992 – 1994 Mykhailo Krailo

=== Chairman of the Executive Committee ===
- 1994 – 1995 Serhiy Ustych

=== Heads of the Administration ===
- 1995 – 1999 Serhiy Ustych
- 1999 – 2001 Viktor Baloha
- 2001 – 2002 Hennadiy Moskal
- 2002 – 2005 Ivan Rizak
- 2005 – 2005 Viktor Baloha
- 2005 – 2010 Oleh Havashi
- 2010 – 2014 Oleksandr Ledyda
- 2014 – 2014 Valeriy Lunchenko
- 2014 – 2015 Vasyl Hubal
- 2015 – 2019 Hennadiy Moskal
- 2019 – 2019 Ivan Duran (acting)
- 2019 – 2019 Ihor Bondarenko
- 2020 Oleksiy Hetmanenko (acting)
- 2020 Oleksiy Petrov
- 2020 – 2021 Anatoliy Poloskov
- 2021 Petro Dobromilskyi (acting)

Heads of military administration

(as titled since 24 February 2022)

- 2021 – 2024 Viktor Mykyta
- 2024 – incumbent Myroslav Biletskyi
