= Governor of Kherson Oblast =

Chief executive of Kherson Oblast, Ukraine

- Seal of Kherson Oblast

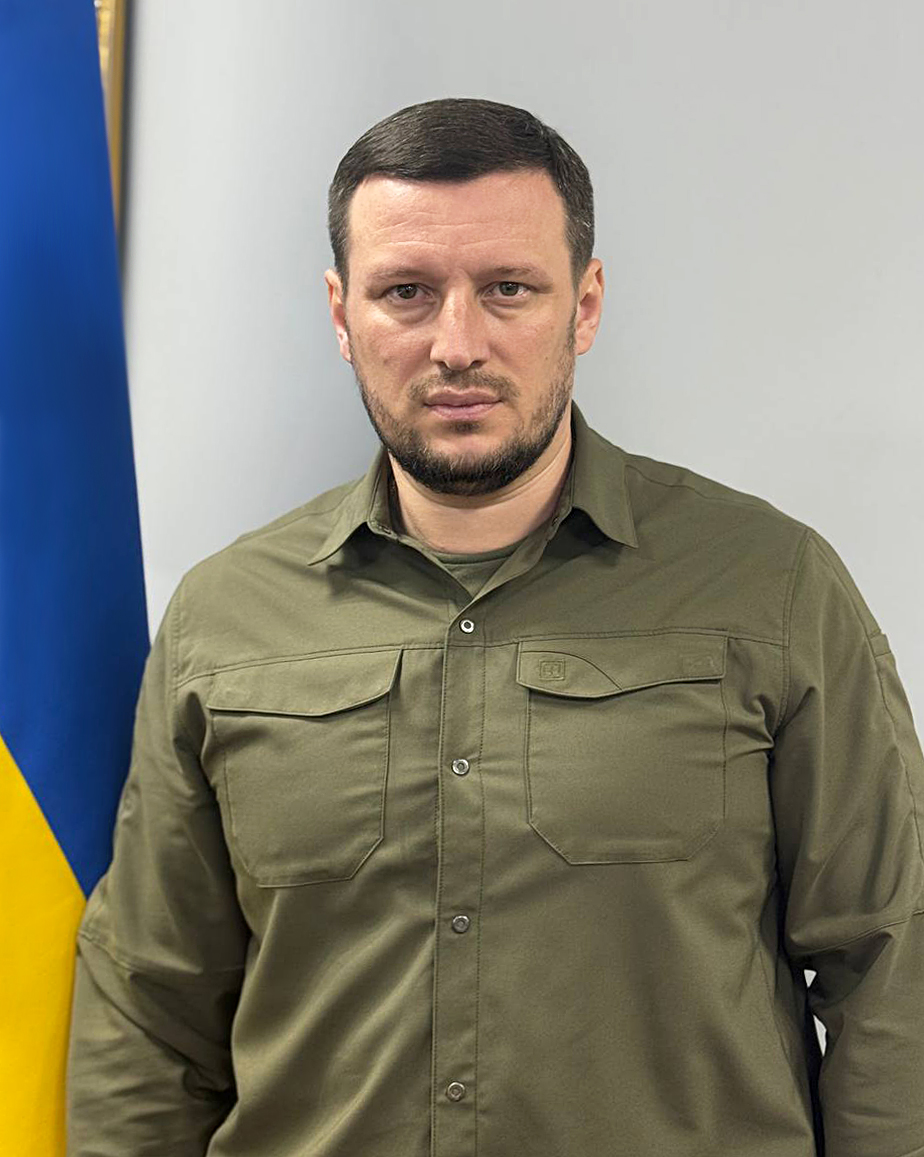
- Incumbent; Oleksandr Prokudin since 7 February 2023
- Residence: Kherson
- Term length: Four years
- Inaugural holder: Pylyp Pasenchenko-Demydenko; 1944
- Formation: 1944 as Chairman of Executive Committee of Kherson Oblast
- Website: Government of Kherson Oblast

The governor of Kherson Oblast is the head of executive branch for the Kherson Oblast in Ukraine.

The office of governor is an appointed position, with officeholders being appointed by the president of Ukraine, on recommendation from the prime minister of Ukraine, to serve a four-year term.

The official residence for the governor is located in Kherson.

== Governors ==
=== Chairman of Executive Committee of Kherson Oblast ===
- Pylyp Pasenchenko-Demydenko (1944–1950)
- Tymofiy Barylnyk (1950–1963)
- Mykola Makushenko (1963–1969) (Note: For Agriculture January 1963 – December 1964)
- Mykola Kobak (1963–1964) (Note: For Industry)
- Dina Protsenko (1969–1978)
- Vasyl Metlyayev (1978–1983)
- Mykhailo Kushnerenko (1983–1987)
- Oleksandr Melnykov (1987–1991)
- Mykhailo Kushnerenko (1991–1992)

=== Representative of the President ===
- Oleksandr Melnykov (1992–1994)

=== Chairman of the Executive Committee ===
- Vitalii Zholobov (1994–1995)

=== Heads of the Administration ===
- Vitalii Zholobov (1995–1996)
- Yurii Karasyk (1996–1997) (Note: Acting to August 8, 1996)
- Mykhailo Kushnerenko (1997–1998)
- Anatoliy Kasyanenko (1998–1999)
- Oleksandr Verbytsky (1999–2001)
- Yuriy Kravchenko (2001–2002)
- Anatolii Yurchenko (2002–2004)
- Serhii Dovhan (2004)
- Volodymyr Khodakovsky (2004–2005)
- Borys Silenkov (2005–2010)
- Anatoliy Hrytsenko (2010)
- Mykola Kostyak (2010–2014)
- Yuriy Odarchenko (2014)
- Ihor Shepelyev (2014) (acting)
- Andriy Putilov (2014–2016)
- Andrii Gordieiev (2016–2019)
- Dmytro Butriy (2019) (acting)
- Yuriy Husev (2019–2020)
- Serhiy Kozyr (2020–2021 (Note: Serhiy Kozyr was the candidate of Servant of the People in the 31 October 2021 early election, called to replace mayor of Kherson Ihor Kolykhaiev, in constituency 184 (located in Kherson Oblast). He was dismissed as acting Governor on 27 October 2021. Kozyr won the early election with 62.6% of the vote (21,365 votes).)) (acting)
- Hennadiy Lahuta (2021-2022)
- Dmytro Butriy (2022) (acting)
- Yaroslav Yanushevych (2022–2023)
- Oleksandr Prokudin (2023–present)

== Sources ==
- World Statesmen.org
