= 2005 in Ukraine =

- Decades: 1980s; 1990s; 2000s; 2010s; 2020s
- See also: History of Ukraine; List of years in Ukraine

Events in the year 2005 in Ukraine.

== Incumbents ==
- President: Leonid Kuchma (until 23 January), Viktor Yushchenko (from 23 January)
- Prime Minister: Viktor Yanukovych (until 5 January), Mykola Azarov (from 5 January until 24 January), Yulia Tymoshenko (from 24 January until 8 September), Yuriy Yekhanurov (from 8 September)

=== Governors ===
- Cherkasy Oblast: Vadym Lyoshenko (until February 4, Independent), Oleksandr Cherevko (starting February 4, NSNU)
- Chernihiv Oblast: Valentyn Melnychuk (until February 4, Independent), Vladyslav Atroshenko (starting February 4, NSNU)
- Chernivtsi Oblast: Mykhailo Romaniv (until February 4, Independent), 淬Mykola Tkachyuk (starting February 4, NSNU)
- Dnipropetrovsk Oblast: Serhiy Kasianov (until March 4, Independent), Yuriy Yekhanurov (March 4–September 22, NSNU), 淬Nadiia Deieva (starting November 11, Independent)
- Donetsk Oblast: Anatoliy Blyznyuk (until January 21, Independent), 淬Vadym Chuprun (starting February 4, Independent / NSNU ally)
- Ivano-Frankivsk Oblast: Mykhailo Vyshyvanyuk (until January 21, Independent), 淬Roman Tkach (starting February 4, NSNU)
- Kharkiv Oblast: Stepan Maselsky (until February 4, Independent), Arsen Avakov (starting February 4, NSNU)
- Kherson Oblast: Vyacheslav Hryshchenko (until February 4, Independent), Borys Silenkov (starting February 4, NSNU)
- Khmelnytskyi Oblast: Viktor Kochubei (until February 4, Independent), Vitaliy Oluyko (February 4–February 14, NP), 淬Ivan Hladunyak (starting March 4, NSNU)
- Kirovohrad Oblast: Vasyl Komarnytskyi (until January 27, Independent), 淬Eduard Zeinalov (starting February 4, NSNU)
- Kyiv Oblast: Anatoliy Zasukha (until January 21, Independent), Yevhen Zhovtyak (starting February 4, NSNU)
- Luhansk Oblast: Oleksandr Yefremov (until January 25, Independent), Oleksiy Danilov (February 4–November 8, Batkivshchyna), 淬Hennadiy Moskal (starting November 18, Independent)
- Lviv Oblast: Oleksandr Sendega (until January 21, Independent), Petro Oliynyk (starting February 4, NSNU)
- Mykolaiv Oblast: Oleksiy Harkusha (until February 4, Independent), 淬Oleksandr Sadykov (starting February 4, NSNU)
- Odesa Oblast: Serhiy Hrynevetskyi (until February 4, Independent), Vasyl Tsushko (starting February 4, SPU)
- Poltava Oblast: Oleksandr Udovichenko (until February 4, Independent), 淬Stepan Bulba (starting February 4, SPU)
- Rivne Oblast: Mykola Soroka (until February 4, Independent), 淬Vasyl Chervoniy (starting February 4, NSNU)
- Sumy Oblast: Volodymyr Shcherban (until January 21, Independent), 淬Mykola Lavryk (starting February 4, NSNU)
- Ternopil Oblast: Mykhailo Tsymbalyuk (until January 21, Independent), 淬Ivan Stoiko (starting February 4, NSNU)
- Vinnytsia Oblast: Yuriy Ivanov (until February 4, Independent), 淬Oleksandr Dombrovskyi (starting February 4, NSNU)
- Volyn Oblast: Volodymyr Bondar (starting February 4, NSNU)
- Zakarpattia Oblast: Ivan Rijak (until January 21, Independent), Viktor Baloha (February 4–September 27, NSNU), 淬Oleh Havashi (starting September 27, Independent / NSNU ally)
- Zaporizhzhia Oblast: Yuriy Artemenko (February 4–November 8, NSNU), 淬Yuriy Kaptyukh (Acting, November 8–December 8), Yevhen Chervonenko (starting December 8, NSNU)
- Zhytomyr Oblast: Mykola Rudchenko (until February 4, Independent), 淬Pavlo Zhebrivskyi (February 4–December 19, NSNU), 淬Yuriy Andriychuk (starting December 30, Independent)

== Events ==
- 19 – 20 November – The 2005 European U23 Judo Championships was held in Kyiv.

== Deaths ==
- Yuri Kravchenko, 53, Ukrainian General of Internal Service and statesman, former interior minister of Ukraine.
- Stepan Senchuk, 50, Ukrainian politician, former governor of Lviv Oblast, homicide by gunshot.
