= 2003 in Ukraine =

- Decades: 1980s; 1990s; 2000s; 2010s; 2020s
- See also: History of Ukraine; List of years in Ukraine

Events in the year 2003 in Ukraine.

== Incumbents ==
- President: Leonid Kuchma
- Prime Minister: Viktor Yanukovych

=== Governors ===
- Cherkasy Oblast: Volodymyr Lukyanets (until December 4), Vadym Lyoshenko (starting December 4) (Independent)
- Chernihiv Oblast: Valentyn Melnychuk (Independent)
- Chernivtsi Oblast: Mykhailo Romaniv (Independent)
- Dnipropetrovsk Oblast: Oleksandr Shvets (until July 30), Volodymyr Yatsuba (starting July 30) (Independent)
- Donetsk Oblast: Anatoliy Blyznyuk (Independent)
- Ivano-Frankivsk Oblast: Mykhailo Vyshyvanyuk (Independent)
- Kharkiv Oblast: Yevhen Kushnaryov (Independent)
- Kherson Oblast: Anatoliy Yurchenko (until July 5), Mykhailo Serdiuk (Acting, July 5–September 23), Anatoliy Podorozhnyak (starting September 23) (Independent)
- Khmelnytskyi Oblast: Mykola Shpak (until July 12), Viktor Kochubei (starting July 12) (Independent)
- Kirovohrad Oblast: Vasyl Motsnyi (Independent)
- Kyiv Oblast: Anatoliy Zasukha (Independent)
- Luhansk Oblast: Oleksandr Yefremov (Independent)
- Lviv Oblast: Myron Yankiv (until June 4), Oleksandr Sendega (starting June 4) (Independent)
- Mykolaiv Oblast: Oleksiy Harkusha (Independent)
- Odesa Oblast: Serhiy Hrynevetskyi (Independent)
- Poltava Oblast: Yevhen Tomin (until July 29), Oleksandr Udovichenko (starting July 29) (Independent)
- Rivne Oblast: Mykola Soroka (Independent)
- Sumy Oblast: Volodymyr Shcherban (Independent)
- Ternopil Oblast: Ivan Kurnytskyi (until July 15), Mykhailo Tsymbalyuk (starting July 15) (Independent)
- Vinnytsia Oblast: Yuriy Ivanov (Independent)
- Volyn Oblast: Anatoliy Francevych (Independent)
- Zakarpattia Oblast: Ivan Rijak (Independent)
- Zaporizhzhia Oblast: Yevhen Kartashov (until July 29), Volodymyr Berezhovskyi (starting July 29) (Independent)
- Zhytomyr Oblast: Mykola Rudchenko (Independent)

== Events ==
- 24 December – The Treaty Between the Russian Federation and Ukraine on Cooperation in the Use of the Sea of Azov and the Kerch Strait is signed by Ukrainian President Leonid Kuchma and Russian President Vladimir Putin.

== Deaths ==
=== July ===
- July 17 - Eleonora Vinogradova, choir director, educator, and professor (b. 1931)

=== Undated ===
- Vasyl Barka
- Oleksandr Ivanovych Bilash
- Ivan Margitych
- Liuboslav Hutsaliuk
