= 2002 in Ukraine =

- Decades: 1980s; 1990s; 2000s; 2010s; 2020s
- See also: History of Ukraine; List of years in Ukraine

Events in the year 2002 in Ukraine.

== Incumbents ==
- President: Leonid Kuchma
- Prime Minister: Anatoliy Kinakh (until 21 November), Viktor Yanukovych (from 21 November)

=== Governors ===
- Cherkasy Oblast: Volodymyr Lukyanets (Independent)
- Chernihiv Oblast: Mykola Butko (until November 15), Valentyn Melnychuk (starting November 15) (Independent)
- Chernivtsi Oblast: Teofil Bauer (until July 29), Mykhailo Romaniv (starting July 29) (Independent)
- Dnipropetrovsk Oblast: Oleksandr Shvets (Independent)
- Donetsk Oblast: Viktor Yanukovych (until November 21), Anatoliy Blyznyuk (starting November 23) (Independent)
- Ivano-Frankivsk Oblast: Mykhailo Vyshyvanyuk (Independent)
- Kharkiv Oblast: Yevhen Kushnaryov (Independent)
- Kherson Oblast: Oleksandr Verbytskyi (until May 21), Anatoliy Yurchenko (starting May 21) (Independent)
- Khmelnytskyi Oblast: Viktor Lundyshev (until July 12), Mykola Shpak (starting July 12) (Independent)
- Kirovohrad Oblast: Vasyl Motsnyi (Independent)
- Kyiv Oblast: Anatoliy Zasukha (Independent)
- Luhansk Oblast: Oleksandr Yefremov (Independent)
- Lviv Oblast: Mykhailo Gladiy (until April 26), Myron Yankiv (starting April 26) (Independent)
- Mykolaiv Oblast: Oleksiy Harkusha (Independent)
- Odesa Oblast: Serhiy Hrynevetskyi (Independent)
- Poltava Oblast: Yevhen Tomin (Independent)
- Rivne Oblast: Mykola Soroka (Independent)
- Sumy Oblast: Volodymyr Shcherban (Independent)
- Ternopil Oblast: Vasily Bazilyuk (until April 26), Ivan Kurnytskyi (starting April 26) (Independent)
- Vinnytsia Oblast: Yuriy Ivanov (Independent)
- Volyn Oblast: Borys Klimchuk (until June 12), Anatoliy Francevych (starting June 12) (Independent)
- Zakarpattia Oblast: Hennadiy Moskal (until September 27), Ivan Rijak (starting September 27) (Independent)
- Zaporizhzhia Oblast: Serhiy Sakhno (until March 26), Yevhen Kartashov (starting March 26) (Independent)
- Zhytomyr Oblast: Serhiy Ryzhuk (until May 19), Mykola Rudchenko (starting May 19) (Independent)

== Events ==
- 27 July – A Ukrainian Air Force Sukhoi Su-27 piloted by Volodymyr Toponar and co-piloted by Yuriy Yegorov crashed during an aerobatics presentation at Sknyliv airfield near Lviv, killing 77 people and injured 543, 100 of whom were hospitalized, making it the deadliest air show accident in history.

== Deaths ==
- Nikolai Amosov, medical doctor (12 December)
- Valeriy Lobanovskyi, football player and manager (13 May)
- George Shevelov, linguist (12 April)
