= 1999 in Ukraine =

- Decades: 1970s; 1980s; 1990s; 2000s; 2010s
- See also: History of Ukraine; List of years in Ukraine

Events in the year 1999 in Ukraine.

== Incumbents ==
- President: Leonid Kuchma
- Prime Minister: Valeriy Pustovoitenko (until 22 December), Viktor Yushchenko (from 22 December)

=== Governors ===
- Cherkasy Oblast: Anatoliy Danylenko (until September 8), Volodymyr Lukyanets (starting September 8) (Independent)
- Chernihiv Oblast: Mykhailo Kaskevych (until August 12), Mykola Butko (starting August 12) (Independent)
- Chernivtsi Oblast: Teofil Bauer (Independent)
- Dnipropetrovsk Oblast: Oleksandr Shvets (Independent)
- Donetsk Oblast: Viktor Yanukovych (Independent)
- Ivano-Frankivsk Oblast: Mykhailo Vyshyvanyuk (Independent)
- Kharkiv Oblast: Oleh Demyn (Independent)
- Kherson Oblast: Oleksandr Verbytskyi (Independent)
- Khmelnytskyi Oblast: Viktor Lundyshev (Independent)
- Kirovohrad Oblast: Mykhailo Bashkirov (until February 2), Valeriy Kalchenko (February 2–November 2), Vasyl Motsnyi (starting November 2) (Independent)
- Kyiv Oblast: Anatoliy Zasukha (Independent)
- Luhansk Oblast: Oleksandr Yefremov (Independent)
- Lviv Oblast: Mykhailo Gladiy (until January 12), Stepan Senchuk (starting January 12) (Independent)
- Mykolaiv Oblast: Mykola Kruhlov (until November 23), Oleksiy Harkusha (starting November 23) (Independent)
- Odesa Oblast: Serhiy Hrynevetskyi (Independent)
- Poltava Oblast: Oleksandr Kolesnikov (until November 2), Anatoliy Kukoba (starting November 2) (Independent)
- Rivne Oblast: Mykola Soroka (Independent)
- Sumy Oblast: Volodymyr Shcherban (Independent)
- Ternopil Oblast: Vasyl Kolomyichuk (Independent)
- Vinnytsia Oblast: Mykola Chuvilo (until November 2), Dmytro Dvorkis (starting November 2) (Independent)
- Volyn Oblast: Borys Klimchuk (Independent)
- Zakarpattia Oblast: Ivan Rijak (until February 9), Fedir Feduta (Acting, February 9–May 5), Viktor Baloha (starting May 5) (Independent)
- Zaporizhzhia Oblast: Volodymyr Kuratchenko (until January 14), Yevhen Kartashov (January 27–November 23), Volodymyr Kuratchenko (starting November 23) (Independent)
- Zhytomyr Oblast: Anton Malynovskyi (Independent)

== Events ==
- 31 October – The first round of presidential elections were held in the country, with a second round held on 14 November. The result was a victory for Leonid Kuchma, who defeated Petro Symonenko in the run-off.
