= 2000 in Ukraine =

- Decades: 1980s; 1990s; 2000s; 2010s; 2020s
- See also: History of Ukraine; List of years in Ukraine

The following lists events that happened during 2000 in Ukraine.

== Incumbents ==
- President: Leonid Kuchma
- Prime Minister: Viktor Yushchenko

=== Governors ===
- Cherkasy Oblast: Volodymyr Lukyanets (Independent)
- Chernihiv Oblast: Mykola Butko (Independent)
- Chernivtsi Oblast: Teofil Bauer (Independent)
- Dnipropetrovsk Oblast: Oleksandr Shvets (Independent)
- Donetsk Oblast: Viktor Yanukovych (Independent)
- Ivano-Frankivsk Oblast: Mykhailo Vyshyvanyuk (Independent)
- Kharkiv Oblast: Oleh Demyn (until March 8), Yevhen Kushnaryov (starting October 27) (Independent)
- Kherson Oblast: Oleksandr Verbytskyi (Independent)
- Khmelnytskyi Oblast: Viktor Lundyshev (Independent)
- Kirovohrad Oblast: Vasyl Motsnyi (Independent)
- Kyiv Oblast: Anatoliy Zasukha (Independent)
- Luhansk Oblast: Oleksandr Yefremov (Independent)
- Lviv Oblast: Stepan Senchuk (Independent)
- Mykolaiv Oblast: Oleksiy Harkusha (Independent)
- Odesa Oblast: Serhiy Hrynevetskyi (Independent)
- Poltava Oblast: Anatoliy Kukoba (until March 14), Valeriy Asadchev (starting March 14) (Independent)
- Rivne Oblast: Mykola Soroka (Independent)
- Sumy Oblast: Volodymyr Shcherban (Independent)
- Ternopil Oblast: Vasyl Kolomyichuk (until June 14), Vasily Bazilyuk (starting June 14) (Independent)
- Vinnytsia Oblast: Dmytro Dvorkis (until January 18), Yuriy Ivanov (starting January 18) (Independent)
- Volyn Oblast: Borys Klimchuk (Independent)
- Zakarpattia Oblast: Viktor Baloha (Independent)
- Zaporizhzhia Oblast: Volodymyr Kuratchenko (until June 14), Oleksiy Kucherenko (starting June 14) (Independent)
- Zhytomyr Oblast: Anton Malynovskyi (until August 31), Serhiy Ryzhuk (starting August 31) (Independent)

== Births ==
- July 17 – Miray Akay, actress

== Deaths ==
- September 17 – Georgiy Gongadze, journalist
