= 1998 in Ukraine =

- Decades: 1970s; 1980s; 1990s; 2000s; 2010s
- See also: History of Ukraine; List of years in Ukraine

Events in the year 1998 in Ukraine.

== Incumbents ==
- President: Leonid Kuchma
- Prime Minister: Valeriy Pustovoitenko

=== Governors ===
- Cherkasy Oblast: Vasyl Tsybenko (until April 10), Anatoliy Danylenko (starting April 10) (Independent)
- Chernihiv Oblast: Petro Shapoval (until April 30), Mykhailo Kaskevych (starting April 30) (Independent)
- Chernivtsi Oblast: Heorhiy Filipchuk (until April 20), Teofil Bauer (starting April 20) (Independent)
- Dnipropetrovsk Oblast: Oleksandr Shvets (Independent)
- Donetsk Oblast: Viktor Yanukovych (Independent)
- Ivano-Frankivsk Oblast: Mykhailo Vyshyvanyuk (Independent)
- Kharkiv Oblast: Oleh Demyn (Independent)
- Kherson Oblast: Anatoliy Kasyanenko (until April 7), Oleksandr Verbytskyi (starting April 7) (Independent)
- Khmelnytskyi Oblast: Yevhen Huselnykov (until September 9), Viktor Lundyshev (starting September 9) (Independent)
- Kirovohrad Oblast: Mykhailo Hromovyi (until October 2), Mykhailo Bashkirov (starting October 2) (Independent)
- Kyiv Oblast: Vasyl Sinko (until September 21), Anatoliy Zasukha (starting September 21) (Independent)
- Luhansk Oblast: Oleksandr Yefremov (Independent)
- Lviv Oblast: Mykhailo Gladiy (Independent)
- Mykolaiv Oblast: Mykola Kruhlov (Independent)
- Odesa Oblast: Ruslan Bodelan (until May 26), Mykola Serdiuk (Acting, May 26–June 3), Serhiy Hrynevetskyi (starting June 3) (Independent)
- Poltava Oblast: Mykola Zaludyak (until June 3), Oleksandr Kolesnikov (starting June 3) (Independent)
- Rivne Oblast: Mykola Soroka (Independent)
- Sumy Oblast: Anatoliy Epifanov (until May 8), 淬Volodymyr Shcherban (starting May 8) (Independent)
- Ternopil Oblast: Vasyl Kolomyichuk (Independent)
- Vinnytsia Oblast: Anatoliy Matviyenko (until May 6), 淬Mykola Chuvilo (starting May 6) (Independent)
- Volyn Oblast: Borys Klimchuk (Independent)
- Zakarpattia Oblast: Serhiy Ustych (until May 5), 淬Serhiy Ratushnyak (Acting, May 5–July 3), Ivan Rijak (starting July 3) (Independent)
- Zaporizhzhia Oblast: Viacheslav Pokhvalsky (until April 9), 淬Volodymyr Kuratchenko (starting April 9) (Independent)
- Zhytomyr Oblast: Anton Malynovskyi (Independent)

== Events ==
- March 29
  - 1998 Ukrainian parliamentary election
  - 1998 Crimean parliamentary election

=== Full date unknown ===
- Kozhaniy Olen', a ska-punk band from Simferopol, is created.

== Births ==
- May 7 – Maryna Piddubna, Paralympic swimmer

== Deaths ==
- April 22 – Vadym Hetman, Chairman of the National Bank of Ukraine 1992–1993
