= 2004 in Ukraine =

- Decades: 1980s; 1990s; 2000s; 2010s; 2020s
- See also: History of Ukraine; List of years in Ukraine

Events in the year 2004 in Ukraine.

== Incumbents ==
- President: Leonid Kuchma
- Prime Minister: Viktor Yanukovych

=== Governors ===
- Cherkasy Oblast: Vadym Lyoshenko (Independent)
- Chernihiv Oblast: Valentyn Melnychuk (Independent)
- Chernivtsi Oblast: Mykhailo Romaniv (Independent)
- Dnipropetrovsk Oblast: Volodymyr Yatsuba (until December 30), Serhiy Kasianov (starting December 30) (Independent)
- Donetsk Oblast: Anatoliy Blyznyuk (Independent)
- Ivano-Frankivsk Oblast: Mykhailo Vyshyvanyuk (Independent)
- Kharkiv Oblast: Yevhen Kushnaryov (until December 17), Stepan Maselsky (starting December 17) (Independent)
- Kherson Oblast: Anatoliy Podorozhnyak (until March 30), Serhiy Dovhan (March 30–October 11), Vyacheslav Hryshchenko (starting October 11) (Independent)
- Khmelnytskyi Oblast: Viktor Kochubei (Independent)
- Kirovohrad Oblast: Vasyl Motsnyi (until March 5), Mykhailo Chernovol (March 5–October 22), Vasyl Komarnytskyi (starting October 22) (Independent)
- Kyiv Oblast: Anatoliy Zasukha (Independent)
- Luhansk Oblast: Oleksandr Yefremov (Independent)
- Lviv Oblast: Oleksandr Sendega (Independent)
- Mykolaiv Oblast: Oleksiy Harkusha (Independent)
- Odesa Oblast: Serhiy Hrynevetskyi (Independent)
- Poltava Oblast: Oleksandr Udovichenko (Independent)
- Rivne Oblast: Mykola Soroka (Independent)
- Sumy Oblast: Volodymyr Shcherban (Independent)
- Ternopil Oblast: Mykhailo Tsymbalyuk (Independent)
- Vinnytsia Oblast: Yuriy Ivanov (Independent)
- Volyn Oblast: Anatoliy Francevych (until February 3), Volodymyr Bondar (starting February 3) (Independent)
- Zakarpattia Oblast: Ivan Rijak (Independent)
- Zaporizhzhia Oblast: Volodymyr Berezhovskyi (until January 18), Yuriy Artemenko (starting January 18) (Independent)
- Zhytomyr Oblast: Mykola Rudchenko (Independent)

== Events ==
- 27 – 28 October – The 60th Anniversary of the Liberation of Ukraine was held in Kyiv, Ukraine on the occasion of the 60th anniversary of the liberation of Ukraine from Nazi Invaders.
