= 2001 in Ukraine =

- Decades: 1980s; 1990s; 2000s; 2010s; 2020s
- See also: History of Ukraine; List of years in Ukraine

Events in the year 2001 in Ukraine.

== Incumbents ==
- President: Leonid Kuchma
- Chairman of the Verkhovna Rada: Ivan Plyushch
- Prime Minister: Viktor Yushchenko (until 29 May), Anatoliy Kinakh (from 29 May)

=== Governors ===
- Cherkasy Oblast: Volodymyr Lukyanets (Independent)
- Chernihiv Oblast: Mykola Butko (Independent)
- Chernivtsi Oblast: Teofil Bauer (Independent)
- Dnipropetrovsk Oblast: Oleksandr Shvets (Independent)
- Donetsk Oblast: Viktor Yanukovych (Independent)
- Ivano-Frankivsk Oblast: Mykhailo Vyshyvanyuk (Independent)
- Kharkiv Oblast: Yevhen Kushnaryov (Independent)
- Kherson Oblast: Oleksandr Verbytskyi (Independent)
- Khmelnytskyi Oblast: Viktor Lundyshev (Independent)
- Kirovohrad Oblast: Vasyl Motsnyi (Independent)
- Kyiv Oblast: Anatoliy Zasukha (Independent)
- Luhansk Oblast: Oleksandr Yefremov (Independent)
- Lviv Oblast: Stepan Senchuk (until March 26), Mykhailo Gladiy (starting March 26) (Independent)
- Mykolaiv Oblast: Oleksiy Harkusha (Independent)
- Odesa Oblast: Serhiy Hrynevetskyi (Independent)
- Poltava Oblast: Valeriy Asadchev (until November 29), Yevhen Tomin (starting November 29) (Independent)
- Rivne Oblast: Mykola Soroka (Independent)
- Sumy Oblast: Volodymyr Shcherban (Independent)
- Ternopil Oblast: Vasily Bazilyuk (Independent)
- Vinnytsia Oblast: Yuriy Ivanov (Independent)
- Volyn Oblast: Borys Klimchuk (Independent)
- Zakarpattia Oblast: Viktor Baloha (until June 1), Hennadiy Moskal (starting June 1) (Independent)
- Zaporizhzhia Oblast: Oleksiy Kucherenko (until March 19), Serhiy Sakhno (March 19–the March 2002 handover) (Independent)
- Zhytomyr Oblast: Serhiy Ryzhuk (Independent)

== Events ==
- 5 December – The Ukrainian Census of 2001, the first census of the population of independent Ukraine, was conducted by the State Statistics Committee of Ukraine.

== Births ==
- Mykhailo Mudryk, footballer (5 January)

== Deaths ==
- Viktor Bannikov, football player and official (25 April)
- Mykhailo Bilyi, politician (5 August)
