= Serhiy Osachuk =

Ukrainian politician

Sergii Osachuk Сергій Осачук
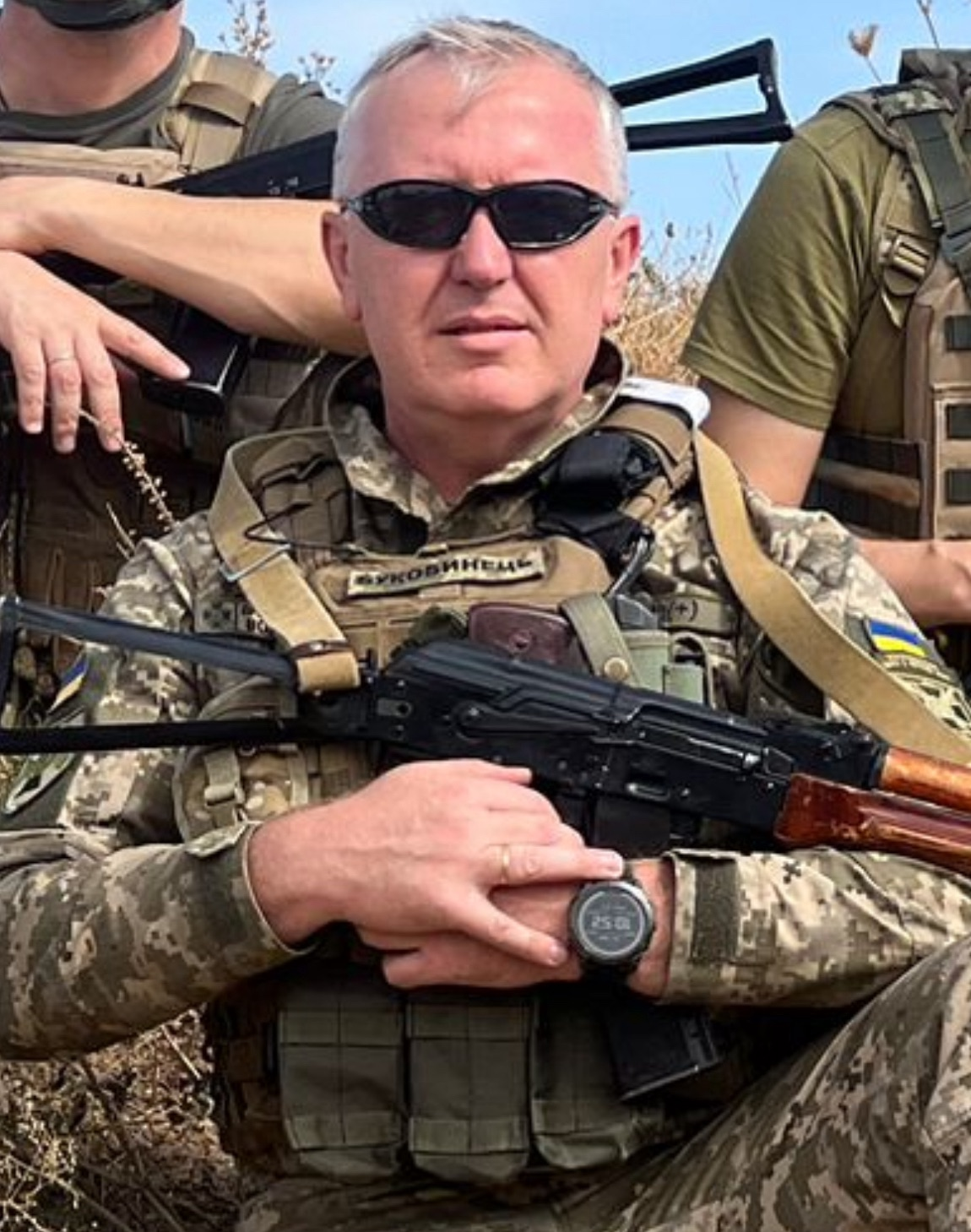

Governor of Chernivtsi Oblast
- In office 22 November 2019 – 13 July 2022
- President: Volodymyr Zelenskyy
- Prime Minister: Oleksiy Honcharuk; Denys Shmygal
- Preceded by: Mykhaylo Pavlyuk (Acting)
- Succeeded by: Ruslan Zaparanyuk

Personal details
- Born: Sergii Dmytrovych Osachuk; 7 June 1972 (age 54) Chernivtsi, Ukrainian SSR, USSR
- Education: University of Chernivtsi
- Occupation: officer, historian politician

Sergii Dmytrovych Osachuk (Ukrainian: Сергій Дмитрович Осачук; born 7 June 1972) is a Ukrainian officer, public servant and historian. Since 2022, he has been a member of the Ukrainian Defense Forces, actively participating in the Russian-Ukrainian war. Osachuk holds the rank of colonel. He served as Governor of Chernivtsi Oblast from 2019 to 2022.

== Biography ==
In 1994, Osachuk graduated from the University of Chernivtsi. He is a PhD in History Science and a senior researcher at the University of Chernivtsi. In 2010, Osachuk ran for the Chernivtsi City Council. Since 2013, he served as an Honorary Consul to Austria.

He speaks English and German fluently.

== Controversies ==
Osachuk was known for a series of controversial statements and measures regarding the Romanians of Chernivtsi Oblast, such as the denial of the Fântâna Albă massacre and the removal from the Central Square of Chernivtsi of the banner that reproduced the first documentary attestation of the city, issued by the Moldavian ruler Alexandru cel Bun. Due to this, the Romanian press labeled him as anti-Romanian.
