= Timeline of Poltava =

Poltava is a city on the Vorskla River in central Ukraine, in existence since the Middle Ages.

== Prior to 20th century ==
- 1174 CE - Site "mentioned in the Hypatian Chronicle" as "Ltava."
- 1240 - "Destroyed by the Golden Horde."
- 1430 - "Tatar prince Leksada" in power.
- 1569 - Poltava becomes part of the Polish–Lithuanian Commonwealth.
- 1650 - Monastery built.
- 1667 - Poltava becomes part of Russia.
- 1709 - Russian forces defeat Swedish forces near city during the Battle of Poltava.
- 1751 - Construction of Dormition Cathedral begins.
- 1773 - Church of the Resurrection built.
- 1802 - Poltava becomes "a provincial centre."
- 1809 - Column of Victory installed in Alexandrovskaya Square.
- 1818 - Institute for Girls founded.
- 1870
  - Poltava-South railway station begins operating.
  - Mitnaggedim synagogue built (approximate date).
- 1900 - Population: 53,060.

== 20th century ==
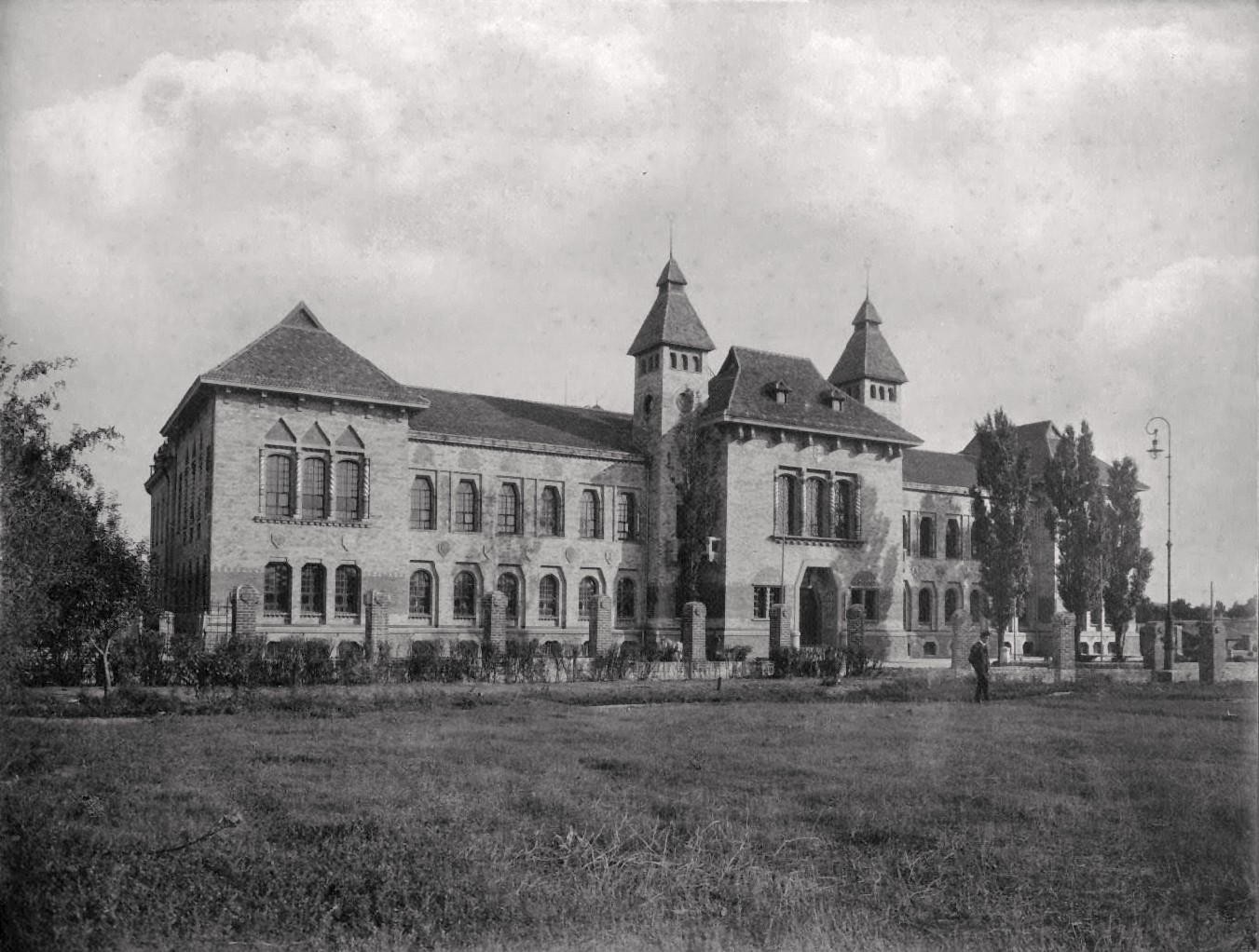
Building of the Regional Museum in the early 20th century

- 1901 - Poltava Kyivska railway station begins operating.
- 1902
  - April: "Rioting in Poltava."
  - May: "Martial law proclaimed in Poltava."
  - December: Poltava Herald newspaper begins publication.
- 1903 - Poltava Provincial Scientific Archival Commission established.
- 1908 - Zemstvo Building constructed.
- 1913 - Population: 82,100.
- 1924 - Military airfield begins operating.
- 1930 - Poltava Institute of Agricultural Construction founded.
- 1937 - Lokomotyv Stadium built.
- 1939 - Population: 130,305.
- 1941
  - German forces take Russian air base.
  - German occupation begins.
  - Nazi prison established by the Germans.
- 1942
  - March: Dulag 205 transit camp for prisoners of war established by the Germans.
  - May: Dulag 151 transit camp for POWs established by the Germans.
  - June: Dulag 160 transit camp for POWs relocated from Khorol to Poltava.
  - June: Dulag 205 camp relocated from Poltava to Krasnohrad.
  - December: Stalag 357 prisoner-of-war camp established by the Germans.
- 1943 - German occupation ends.
- 1951 - Urozhai Stadium built.
- 1955 - FC Vorskla Poltava football club formed.
- 1959 - Population: 143,097.
- 1962 - Poltava trolleybus begins operating.
- 1968 - Military school established.
- 1974 - New Poltava Airport terminal built.
- 1975 - Population: 263,000.
- 1985 - Population: 302,000.
- 1992 - Evening Poltava (Вечірня Полтава) newspaper begins publication.
- 2000 - City flag design adopted.

== 21st century ==
- 2001 - Population: 317,998.
- 2002 - Kolo (Коло) newspaper begins publication.
- 2006 - Andriy Matkovsky (Матковський Андрій Всеволодович) becomes mayor.
- 2007 - FC Poltava football club formed.
- 2011 - SC Poltava football club formed.
- 2013 - November: Poltava Euromaidan protest begins.
- 2018 - Population: 282,523 (estimate).

== See also ==
- Poltava history
- History of Poltava (in Ukrainian)
- List of mayors of Poltava

== Bibliography ==
- Peter Wiernik (1905), "Poltava", Jewish Encyclopedia, vol. 10, New York, hdl:2027/osu.32435029752854
- Annette M. B. Meakin (1906). Russia, Travels and Studies. London: Hurst and Blackett. p. 265. OCLC 3664651. "Poltava"
- "Poltava", Encyclopædia Britannica (11th ed.), New York, 1910, OCLC 14782424 – via Internet Archive
- "Poltava". Russia with Teheran, Port Arthur, and Peking. Leipzig: Karl Baedeker. 1914. OCLC 1328163.
