= Zaporizhzhia Regional Committee of the Communist Party of Ukraine =

Regional committee of the Communist Party of Ukraine

The Zaporizhzhia Regional Committee of the Communist Party of Ukraine, commonly referred to as the Zaporizhzhia CPU obkom, was the position of highest authority in the Zaporizhzhia Oblast, in the Ukrainian SSR of the Soviet Union. The position was created on January 10, 1939, and abolished in August 1991. The First Secretary was a de facto appointed position usually by the Politburo or the First Secretary of the Communist Party of Ukraine.

== List of First Secretaries of the Communist Party of Zaporizhzhia ==
Name	Term of Office		Life years
Name	Start	End	Life years
First Secretaries of the Oblast Committee of the Communist Party
Fedir Matyushin	January 1939	1941	1904–1979
Nazi German occupation (1941–1943)
Fedir Matyushin	1943	August 30, 1946	1904–1979
Leonid Brezhnev	August 30, 1946	November 22, 1947	1906–1982
Georgiy Yenyutin	November 22, 1947	1951	1903–1969
Illya Ivanov	June 1951	1952	1904–1979
Anton Hayovy	March 1952	December 1957	1907–1962
Volodymyr Skryabin	December 1957	August 16, 1962	1908–1988
Oleksiy Tytarenko (Note: For Industry January 1963 – December 15, 1964)	August 16, 1962	March 24, 1966	1915–1992
Fedir Mokrous (Note: For Agriculture)	January 1963	December 15, 1964	1915–....
Mykhailo Vsevolozhsky	March 24, 1966	November 18, 1985	1917–2000
Anatoliy Sazonov	November 18, 1985	October 22, 1988	1935–
Hryhoriy Kharchenko	October 22, 1988	October 5, 1990	1936–
Valeriy Malev	October 5, 1990	August 1991	1939–2002

== See also ==
- Governor of Zaporizhzhia Oblast

== Sources ==
- World Statesmen.org
