= Sydir Kizin =

Ukrainian lawyer and politician

- Сидір Кізін
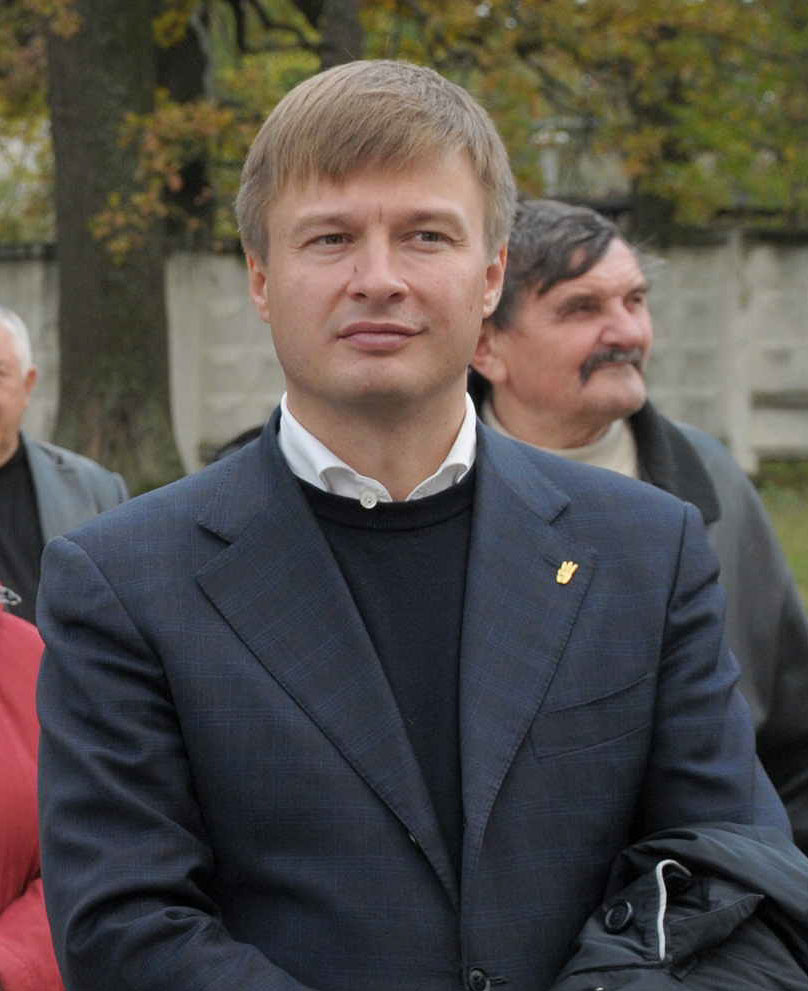
- Kizin in 2012

Governor of Zhytomyr Oblast
- In office March 2014 – July 2014
- Preceded by: Serhiy Ryzhuk
- Succeeded by: Serhiy Mashkovskyi

Personal details
- Born: 15 November 1975 (age 50) Zhytomyr or Lviv, Ukrainian SSR, Soviet Union (now Ukraine)
- Party: Svoboda
- Education: Ivan Franko National University of Lviv

Sydir Vasyliovych Kizin (Note: Sydir is also spelled Sydor (Ukrainian: Сидор) (Ukrainian: Сидір Васильович Кізін; born 15 November 1975) is a Ukrainian lawyer and politician who briefly served as Governor of Zhytomyr Oblast from March to July 2014. He is a member of the Svoboda party.

== Early life and career ==
Sydir Vasylovych Kizin was born in the city of Zhytomyr or Lviv[?] on 15 November 1975.

From 1982 to 1991 Kizin studied at school number 23 in Zhytomyr.

Kizin participated in the national revival of the late 1980s and early 1990s in Zhytomyr Oblast, attended meetings of the Taras Shevchenko Society of Ukrainian Language and took part in such events as "Chain of Unity" and the Revolution on Granite.

In 1992–1998 he studied at the Faculty of Law in the Ivan Franko National University of Lviv, obtained the qualification of lawyer.

Since March 1994 Kizin worked on different positions in the district court. Since 1996 he worked in the Department of justice.

In 1998–2002, Kizin worked at the Securities and Stock Market State Commission (SSMSC) as an assistant to the Head of the State Commission, than as Deputy Head of Legal Department of Securities and Stock Market State Commission of Ukraine.

In 2002 Kizin started his own law practice. Kizin passed Bar exam, received the advocate's Certificate and became a member of the Zhytomyr Regional Bar Association.

From 2003 to 2007 he was a partner of the Law Firm "Kizin, Chibisov and Partners".

2007-2014 Kizin was a partner of the Lawyers Association "Bondarchuk, Kizin and Partners".

From 2020 Sydir Kizin is a partner of "Senators" advocates union (Kyiv), and Kizin Chibisov & Partners Law Firm.

== Membership in the Ukrainian and international professional associations ==
Since 2002 Kizin is a member of the Zhytomyr Regional Bar Association. In 2006 member of the European Business Association (EBA). In March 2007 he joined the Ukrainian-American Bar Association (UABA).

== Public and political activity ==
In 2009 Kizin became a co-founder of the Public Organization "Lustration". Since 2009 he has been a member of Svoboda, serving as Deputy Head of the Legal Department. During this period, on a cost-free basis he has participated in dozens of high-profile trials in defense of political prisoners, opposition journalists and civic activists. Among them are Olena Bilozerska, Mykola Kokhanivskiy, Vitaliy Zaporozhets, Andriy Korenivskiy, Olena Halahuza, Roman Orynovskiy, and many others.

In the 2012 Ukrainian parliamentary election, Kizin was a candidate in Verkhovna Rada (Ukrainian parliament) from Batkivshchyna (Yulia Tymoshenko), and Svoboda (Oleh Tiahnybok). Kizin had second result with 22.06% of votes.

From March 2014 to July 2014 Sydir Kizin worked as Governor of Zhytomyr Oblast.

In the 2014 Ukrainian parliamentary election, Kizin was 21st on the election list of Svoboda. Since the party came 0.29% short of overcoming the 5% threshold to win seats on a nationwide list, Kizin was not elected to the Verkhovna Rada.

In 2015 Kizin participated the election of Mayor of Zhytomyr. The same year, he was elected to the Zhytomyr Oblast Council. Between 2015 and 2020 he was head of Justice and Rule of Law Commission within the council.

From 2020 Sydir Kizin is a partner of "Senators" advocates union (Kyiv), and Kizin Chibisov & Partners Law Firm.

== Family ==
In 2008 Sydir Kizin married to Marianna Kizina (born 1984). They have 3 children: Ustym (2008), Lev (2014) and Platon (2017).
