= Roman Vanzuryak =

Ukrainian politician (born 1980)

Roman Vanzuryak Роман Ванзуряк
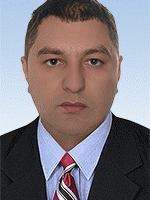
- Official portrait, 2012

Governor of Chernivtsi Oblast
- In office 21 March 2014 – 15 April 2014
- Preceded by: Mykhailo Romaniv
- Succeeded by: Ivan Rybak (acting)

Member of the Verkhovna Rada
- In office 12 December 2012 – 14 April 2014

Personal details
- Born: Roman Stepanovych Vanzuryak; 13 April 1980 (age 46) Hlyboka, Hlyboka Raion, Soviet Union
- Party: Batkivshchyna; UDAR
- Education: Chernivtsi University

Roman Stepanovych Vanzuryak (Ukrainian: Роман Степанович Ванзуряк; born 13 April 1980, in Hlyboka, Soviet Union) is a Ukrainian customs officer and later politician, member of the Verkhovna Rada.

In 2006–2011, he worked as a customs officer at the Romania-Ukraine border in Chernivtsi Oblast (Vadul-Siret).

In 2008–2010, Vanzuryak was a member of Chernivtsi Oblast council.

In 2012–2014, he became a member of Verkhovna Rada representing the UDAR.

In 2014, Vanzuryak served as a Governor of Chernivtsi Oblast.
