= Ruslan Zaparanyuk =

Ukrainian politician (born 1974)

- Руслан Запаранюк
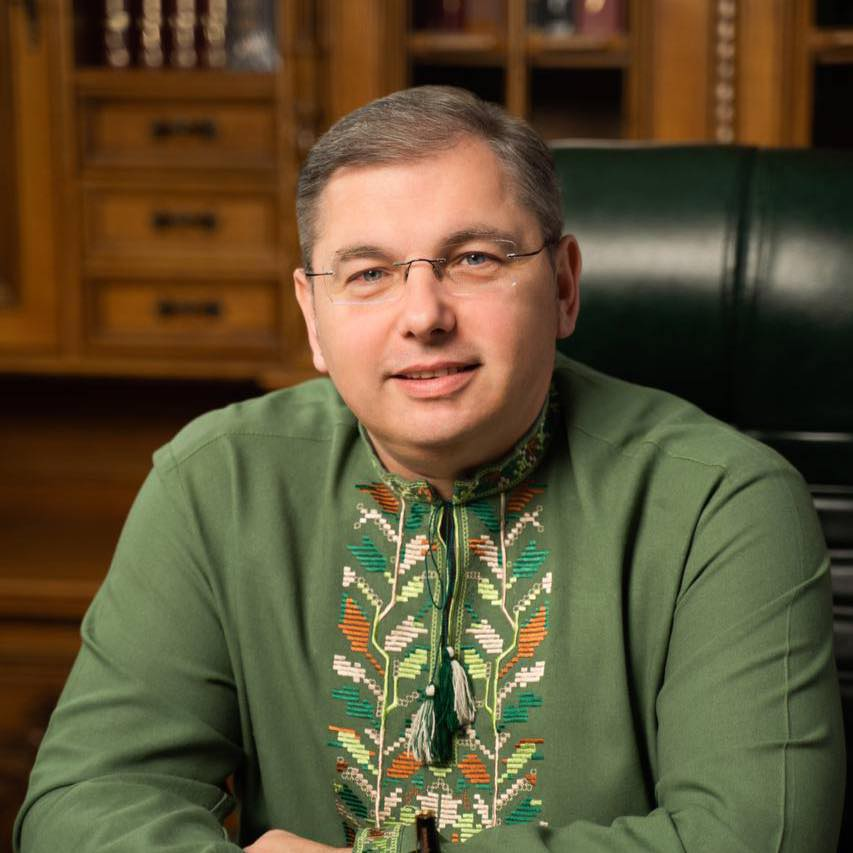

Governor of Chernivtsi Oblast
- In office 11 July 2022 – 8 January 2026
- President: Volodymyr Zelenskyy
- Prime Minister: Denys Shmyhal
- Preceded by: Serhiy Osachuk
- Succeeded by: Ruslan Osypenko

Personal details
- Born: Ruslan Vasylovych Zaparanyuk; 1974 (age 51–52) Nyzhni Stanivtsi, Ukraine, Soviet Union
- Party: Servant of the People

Ruslan Vasylovych Zaparanyuk (Ukrainian: Руслан Васильович Запаранюк; born in 1974), is a Ukrainian politician who was the governor of Chernivtsi Oblast since from 2022 to 2026.

== Biography ==
Ruslan Zaparanyuk was born in 1974. In 1997, he graduated from Chernivtsi University with a specialty of "physicist, teacher". In 2003, he studied at the Chernivtsi Institute of Trade and Economics of the Kyiv National University of Trade and Economics with a specialty of "accounting and auditing economist".

He worked in various positions in the financial sector of the Chernivtsi Oblast. From July 2014 to July 2022, he was the head of the branch of the Chernivtsi regional administration of State Savings Bank of Ukraine JSC.

He is the founder of the public organization "Bukovynsky oberig", which worked in the field of law. In 2020, he ran for the Chernivtsi Oblast Council from the United Alternative party.

On 11 July 2022, Zaparanyuk became the Governor of Chernivtsi Oblast.
