= Agrofirm Svitanok =

- Company type: Private
- Industry: Crop cultivation: grain, leguminous, and oilseed
- Founder: Tetyana Zasukha
- Headquarters: Kovalivka, Kyiv Oblast
- Products: Meat processing, baked goods, pasta

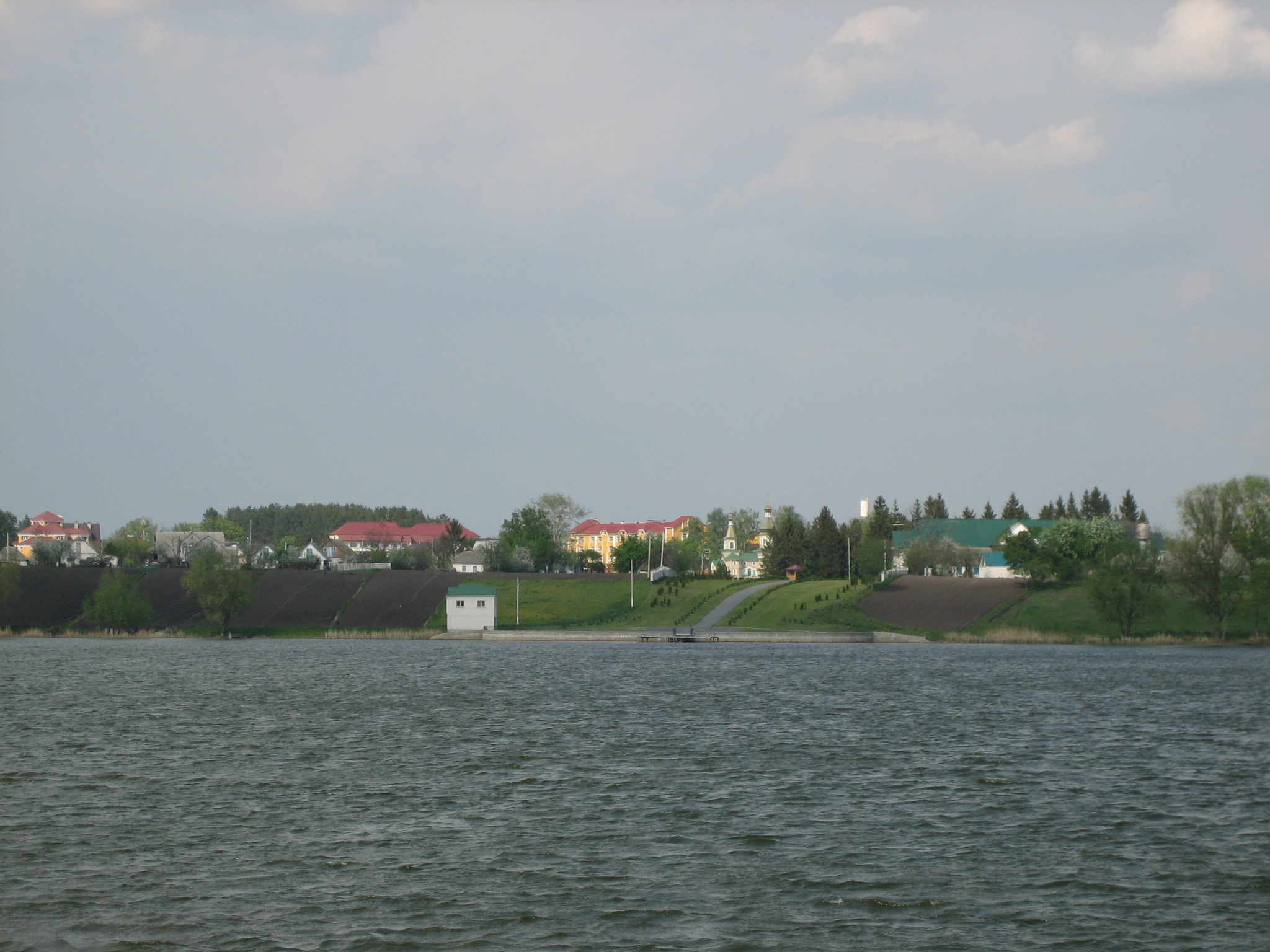
The village of Kovalivka

Agrofirm "Svitanok" (Ukrainian: Агрофірма “Світанок”) is the second largest land owner in Ukraine. Based out of the village of Kovalivka in the Bila Tserkva Raion of the Kyiv Oblast, in 2021 it owned 1,841 hectares (4,550 acres), according to the State Service of Geodesy, Cartography, and Cadastre. The name "Svitanok" means "Dawn" in Ukrainian.

== History ==
The agricultural holding was formed in 1993 out of a Soviet-era collective farm "kolkhoz imeni Schorsa" by Tetyana Zasukha; she was elected as a chair of the board in 1993 in place of her husband Anatoliy Zasukha, who held this post from 1985. The collective farm was formed in 1950 out of three other collective farms. In 2000 the farm was privatized. In 2013 the Anti-Monopoly Committee of Ukraine allowed Agrofirm Svitanok to expand, taking over several other companies. Later in 2021, it was announced by Roman Leshchenko that the owners of the company may face NSDC sanctions for allegeed large-scale land fraud. He specifically called into question the practices of Svitanok, stating that Svitanok had acquired 461 plots totaling 419 hectares near Fastiv, whhich he said was accumulated through abuse of land privatization rules and unfair land acquisition practices. In 2025, two dozen drones of the Geran-2 variety attacked Svitanok's pig complex in Novovodolazka (Kharkiv Oblast), killing an estimated 13,000 pigs of the company worth more than 300 million UAH and at least 8 buildings were destroyed or heavily damaged.

The firm owns at least three grain elevators and several sugar factories, including "Salivonkovsky" and "Chervonsky Tsukrovyk".

== Sports sponsoring ==
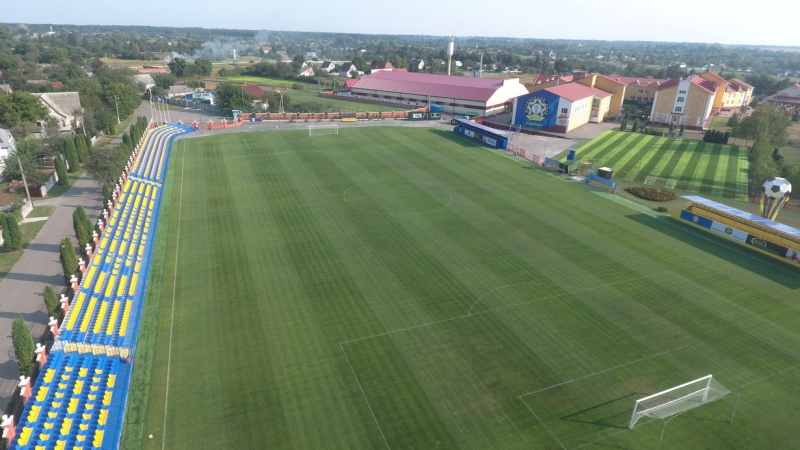
Stadium of FC Kolos in the village of Kovalivka

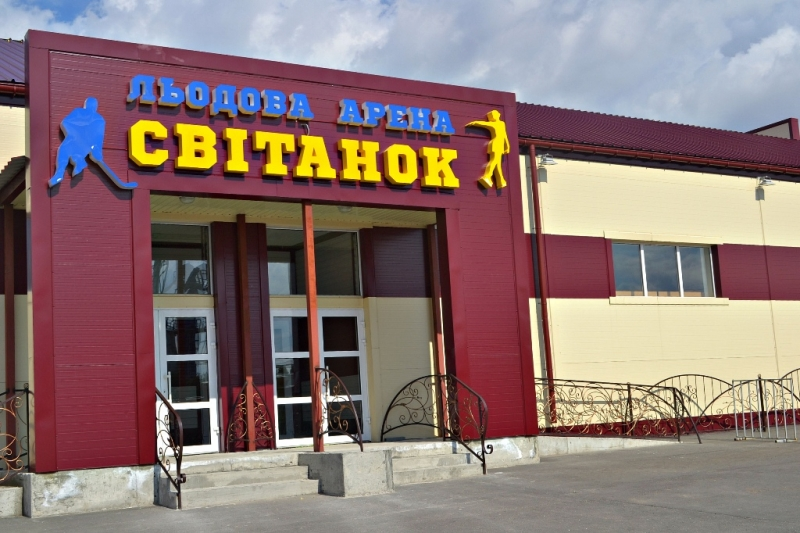
Ice rink "Svitanok" in the village of Kovalivka

The agrofirm expresses its social responsibility policies through social and infrastructure projects in and around its headquarter town. One prominent project is the creation in 2012 and further sponsorship of the football club FC Kolos Kovalivka. Founded in 2012, the club made it into the Ukrainian Premiere League seven years later, in the season of 2019/2020. In the season of 2022/2023 Kolos has finished at 8th position. As of 2023, the club consists of three teams: men's team, women's team and under-19 team.
