= Vitaliy Turynok =

Ukrainian politician

Vitaliy Turynok Віталій Туринок
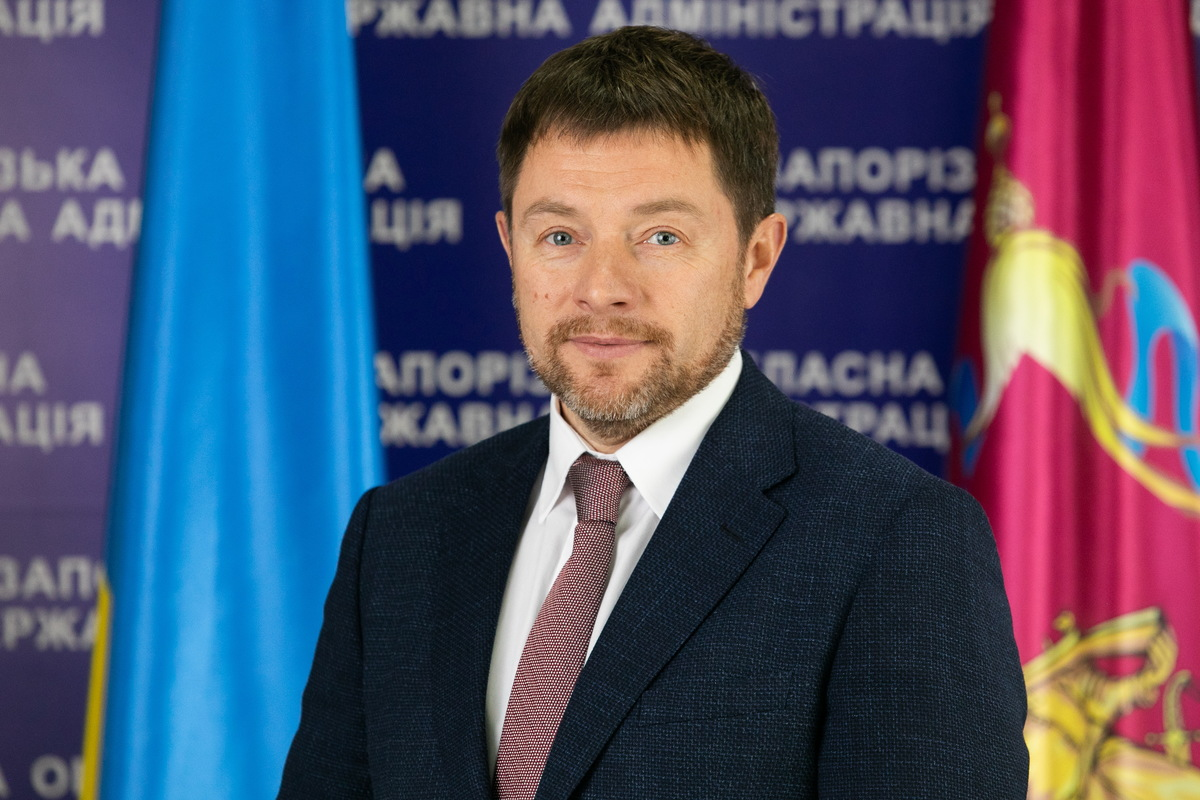

Governor of Zaporizhzhia Oblast
- In office 5 September 2019 – 12 June 2020
- President: Volodymyr Zelenskyy
- Prime Minister: Oleksiy Honcharuk; Denys Shmygal
- Preceded by: Konstantyn Bryl
- Succeeded by: Vitaliy Bohovin

Personal details
- Born: Vitaliy Viktorovych Turynok; 14 September 1973 (age 53) Svobodne, Volnovakha Raion, Donetsk Oblast, Ukrainian SSR, Soviet Union
- Party: Independent
- Education: Zaporizhzhia State Engineering Academy
- Occupation: entrepreneur politician

Vitaliy Viktorovych Turynok (Ukrainian: Віталій Вікторович Туринок; born 14 September 1973) is a Ukrainian entrepreneur and politician. He is a former Governor of Zaporizhzhia Oblast.

== Early life ==
Turynok was born on 14 September 1973 in the village of Svobodne, which was then part of the Ukrainian SSR in the Soviet Union. After initially working as a seasonal worker at a state farm in Donetsk Oblast and then as an auxiliary worker at the Donetsk Chemical‑Metallurgical Plant, he became a preparatory day student at the Zaporizhzhia Industrial Institute. In 1997, after transferring there, he graduated from the Zaporizhzhia State Engineering Academy as an Electronic engineer.

After graduation, he began to work in business. He was first director of Afganets LLC, then the Director of Development and Deputy Director for Commercial Affairs for Postulate LLC. From 2003 to 2011 he was chairman of the board of the Rivne House-Building Plant. He then stepped down to be Chairman of the Supervisory Board and Regional Development Manager for the company until 2019.

== Political career ==
In 2019, he was appointed as Governor of Zaporizhzhia Oblast by President Volodymyr Zelenskyy. This resulted in a minor controversy where Deputy Prime Minister Pavlo Rozenko accused the Office of the President of selecting Turynok with no competition, HR selection, and that the appointment was entirely behind the scenes. He was dismissed from the post on 12 June 2020 by Decree No. 220/2020 by Zelenskyy and replaced by Vitaliy Bohovin, a member of the Servant of the People party and previous director of the enterprise Bizon-Tech.

== Personal life ==
Turynok is married, he has three children.
