= Viktor Mialyk =

Ukrainian politician

- Віктор М'ялик
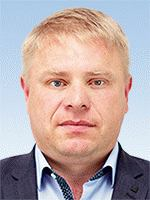
- Official portrait, 2019

People's Deputy of Ukraine
- Incumbent
- Assumed office 29 August 2019
- Preceded by: Vasyl Yanitskyi
- Constituency: Rivne Oblast, No. 155

Personal details
- Born: 10 May 1979 (age 46) Voronky
- Party: ZM
- Other political affiliations: Independent

Viktor Nychyporovych Mialyk (Ukrainian: Віктор Ничипорович М'ялик; born 10 May 1979) is a Ukrainian politician currently serving as a People's Deputy of Ukraine from Ukraine's 155th electoral district since 29 August 2019. He is a member of For the Future.

== Early life and career ==
Viktor Nychyporovych Mialyk was born on 10 May 1979 in the village of Voronky, in Ukraine's Rivne Oblast. He began his working career in 1996, as a worker on the Zaria kolkhoz. In 2000, he graduated from the Volodymyrets Professional and Technical College No. 29, specialising in carpentry.

Until 2014, Mialyk primarily worked in the craft industry; from 2004 to 2005 he worked as a plasterer, from 2005 to 2011 he worked as an electric welder, and from 2011 to 2014 he was foreman of a carpentry brigade. In 2014, he became financial director at MDS-Story LLC, and in 2017 he founded his own company, MD Plus, a real estate company.

In 2019, he graduated from the Yuri Bugai International Scientific and Technical University with a specialisation in legal studies.

== Political career ==
Mialyk ran in the 2014 Ukrainian parliamentary election as an independent candidate in Ukraine's 155th electoral district, but lost to Vasyl Yanitskyi, garnering 15.80% to Yanitskyi's 28.68%. Mialyk ran again in the 2019 Ukrainian parliamentary election, and this time won, beating out Yanitskyi and Servant of the People candidate Volodymyr Rashovskyi, taking 32.83% of the vote compared to Rashkovskyi's 25.97% and Yanitskyi's 20.81%. In the Verkhovna Rada, Mialyk joined For the Future and the Verkhovna Rada Committee on Organisation of State Power and Local Self-Rule.

On 25 March 2021, Prosecutor General of Ukraine Iryna Venediktova announced an investigation into Mialyk over suspicion of tax fraud involving ₴97 million. According to Venediktova, Mialyk made a business out of selling apartments in Kyiv from 2012 and paying only 5% of profits to tax authorities, as opposed to the required 18%.
