= Mayor of Poltava =

The following is a list of mayors of the city of Poltava, Ukraine. It includes positions equivalent to mayor, such as chairperson of the city council executive committee.

== Mayors ==
=== Russian Empire ===
- Jacob Kishchenko (Яків Кищенко), 1800–1802
- Ilya Prokofiev (Ілля Прокоф'єв), 1802–1805
- Yakov Lokoshchenko (Яків Локощенко), 1805–1808
- Ilya Prokofiev (Ілля Прокоф'єв), 1808–1811
- Mykola Cherkasov (Микола Черкасов), 1811–1814
- Ivan Mikhailovsky (Іван Михайловський), 1814–1818
- Ilya Prokofiev (Ілля Прокоф'єв), 1818–1819
- Abraham of Green (Авраам Зеленський), 1819–1822
- Pavlo Chubenko (Павло Чубенко), 1822-1829
- Peter Vorozheykin (Петро Ворожейкін), 1829–1832
- Andriy Panasenko (Андрій Панасенко), 1832–1835
- Stepan Komar (Степан Комар), 1835–1838
- Stepan Medvedev (Степан Медведєв), 1838-1841
- Peter Vorozheykin (Петро Ворожейкін), 1841–1843
- Semyon Belyaev (Семен Бєляєв), 1843–1850
- Stepan Komar (Степан Комар), 1850–1852
- Mykola Vakulenko (Микола Вакуленко), 1852–1855
- Ivan Tengeleev (Іван Тенгелєєв), 1855–1864
- Stepan Panasenko (Степан Панасенко), 1864–1868
- Semyon Kovanko (Семен Кованько), 1868–1871
- Abaza Alexander Mikhailovich (Олександр Абаза), 1871–1888
- Victor Tregubov (Віктор Трегубов), 1888-1906
- Petro Kulyabko-Koretsky (Петро Кулябко-Корецький), 1906–1908
- Alexander Chernenko (Олександр Черненко), 1908–1913
- Sergey Zankovsky (Сергій Заньковський), 1913-1917
- Sergey Semenchenko (Сергій Семенченко), 1917

=== Ukraine ===
- Anatoliy Kukoba, 1990–2006
- Andriy Matkovsky (Матковський Андрій Всеволодович), 2006–2011
- Oleksandr Mamay (Мамай Олександр Федорович), 2011–2018
- Oleksandr Shamota (Шамота Олександр Сергійович), 2018–2020
- Oleksandr Mamay 2020–2023
- Andriy Karpov (Андрій Карпов), April 2023 – July 2023
- Kateryna Yamshchykova (Катерина Ямщикова), July 2023 – present

== See also ==
- Timeline of Poltava
- Poltava history
- History of Poltava (in Ukrainian)
