= Odyniec coat of arms =

Polish coat of arms

Odyniec
- Earliest mention: unknown
- Towns: none
- Families: 19 names altogether: Bahrymowski, Barynowski, Bnozowieck, Bohusz, Brzozowiecki, Burło-Burdzicki, Dobrowolski, Holcowski, Odyniec, Odyniecki, Odyńcewicz, Omeliński, Omyliński, Rafałowicz, Rasałowicz, Rykała, Szostowski, Wisłouch, Ząbkowski

Odyniec (Polish for "Boar") is a Polish coat of arms. It was used by several szlachta (noble) families under the Polish–Lithuanian Commonwealth.

== Notable bearers ==
Notable bearers of this coat of arms have included:

- Antoni Edward Odyniec, writer (1804–1885)
- Mykola Shpak, Ukrainian poet, writer and translator (1909–1942)
- Zygmunt Bohusz-Szyszko, Inspector General of the Armed Forces of Poland (1893–1982)

== See also ==
- Polish heraldry
- Heraldry
- Coat of arms
