= Vasyl Yanitskyi =

Ukrainian lawyer and politician

- Василь Яніцький
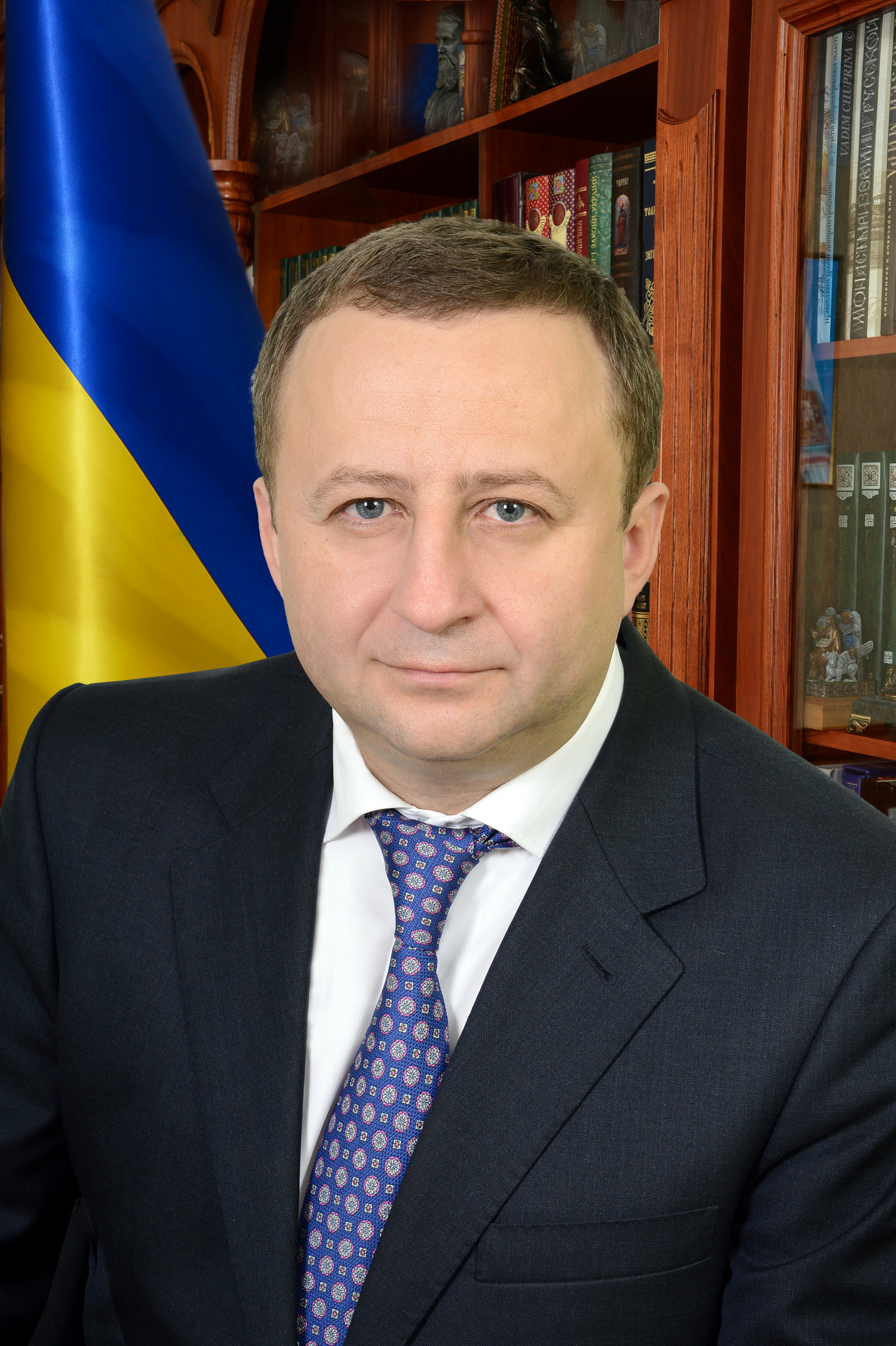

People's Deputy of Ukraine
- In office 27 November 2014 – 29 August 2019
- Preceded by: Mykola Soroka
- Succeeded by: Viktor Mialyk
- Constituency: Rivne Oblast, No. 155

Personal details
- Born: 14 January 1973 (age 53) Zarichne, Ukrainian SSR, Soviet Union (now Ukraine)
- Party: Petro Poroshenko Bloc
- Education: Taras Shevchenko National University of Kyiv

Vasyl Petrovych Yanitskyi (Ukrainian: Василь Петрович Яніцький; born 14 January 1973) is a Ukrainian lawyer and politician who served as a People's Deputy of Ukraine in the 8th Ukrainian Verkhovna Rada.

== Education ==
Taras Shevchenko National University of Kyiv –

- 1995 – Law Faculty.
- 2003 – Faculty of Economy, specialty «Accounting and audit».
- 1998 – Passed qualification examination and got the right to start attorney's activity.
- 2007 – Presented a candidate of science thesis, topic: «The procedure of getting land title for land property in Ukraine»

== Work activity ==
- 1995 – LLC Law Company "Yur-Agro-Vesta".
- 1996 – Director of LLC Law office "Promaks".
- 1998 – an attorney of bar association "Promaks".
- 1999 – CJSC Law company "Eurotech" .
- 2000 – Chairman of the Board «Eurotech-Holding» which was renamed as CJSC Law Company "Eurotech" 2001.
- 2001 – Director of CJSC Law Company "Eurotech".

== Social-political activity ==
- 2006 – 2014 – Deputy of Solomianka Raion, Kyiv.
- 26 October 2014 – Vasyl Yanitskyi won unscheduled Parliamentary elections at single member electoral district 155, Rivne Oblast, from Petro Poroshenko Bloc "Solidarity" with the result 28.68% or 27,597 votes.
- People's Depute of the VIIIth convocation
- Date of gaining deputy's authority is 27 November 2014.
- The member of deputy's faction Petro Poroshenko Bloc "Solidarity".
- Post – a Chairman of the Executive Board of the Verkhovna Rada's Committee of Ukraine on the questions of legal policy and justice.

In the 2019 Ukrainian parliamentary election Verkhovna failed as an independent candidate in constituency 155 (in Rivne Oblast) to get reelected to parliament. He lost this election with 20.82% of the votes to Viktor Mialyk (who won with 32.83% of the votes).

== IPU (International Public Unit) «Rivne Association of fellow-countrymen» ==
- 2009 – was elected the vice-president of IPO (Interregional Public Organization)«Rivne Association of fellow-countrymen». As a native from Polissia took care of Northern regions of the oblast.
- 2010 – a charity fund of Vasyl Yanitskyi "Our Region" was founded to maintain creative youth, advocacy of the healthy style of life, help the natives to solve current problems.

== Family ==
He is married. Brings up two sons – Vadym and Oleksiy.

== Awards and honoured titles ==
- A title Honoured Lawyer of Ukraine was awarded by the President's Decree. October 4, 2007.
- Was entitled with acknowledgements of the city's head of Kyiv (2007, 2011.)
- Was entitled with acknowledgements of Solomianka Raion in Kyiv (2007)
- Got the Certificate of Merrit of Rivnes Oblast Council (2011)

== Interests ==
Football, skiing, history.
