= Ruslan Osypenko =

- Руслан Осипенко
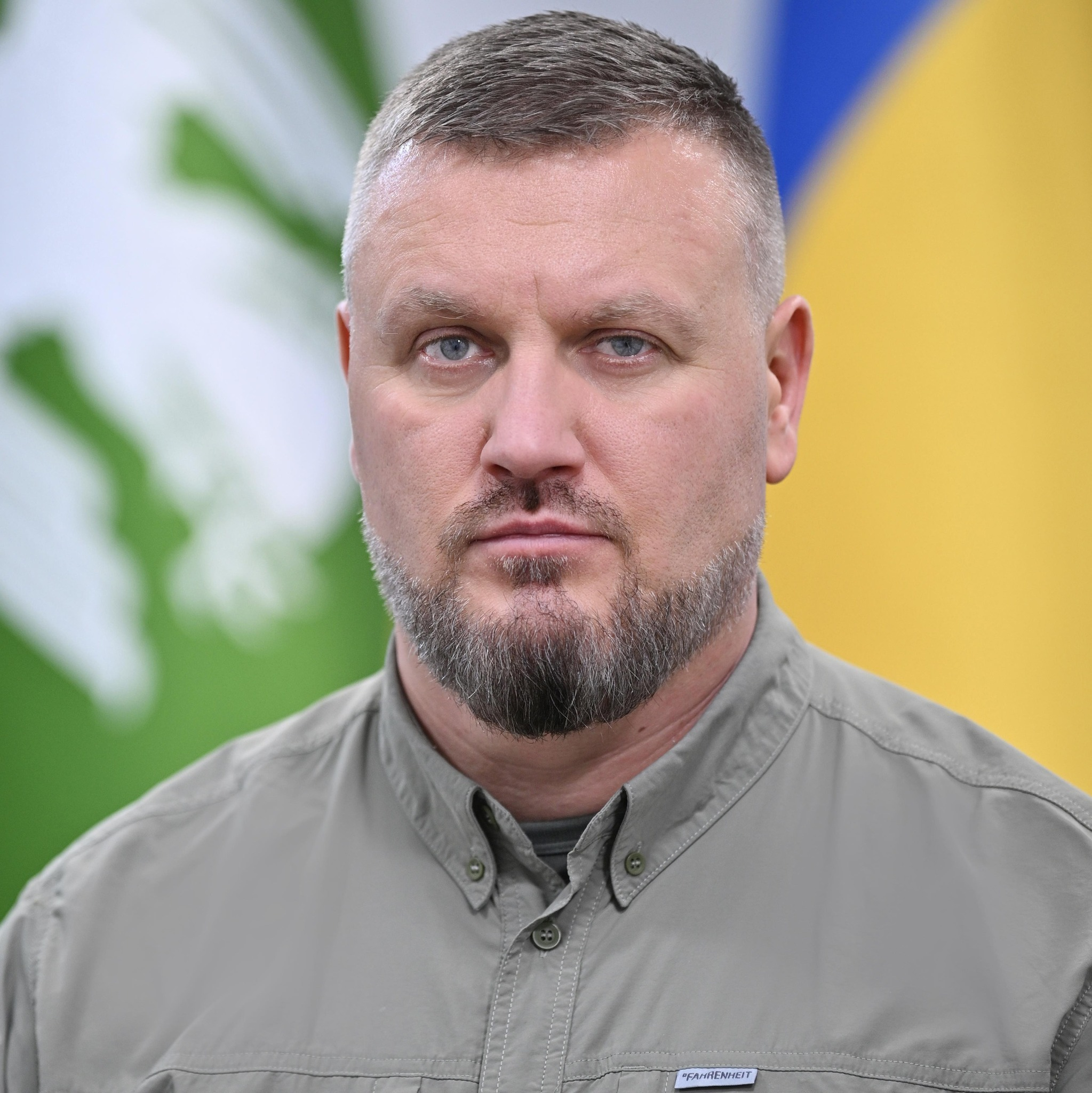
- Osypenko in January 2026

Governor of Chernivtsi Oblast
- Incumbent
- Assumed office 8 January 2026
- President: Volodymyr Zelenskyy
- Preceded by: Ruslan Zaparanyuk

Personal details
- Born: 5 August 1978 (age 47) Kypuche, Luhansk Oblast, Ukrainian SSR, Soviet Union

Ruslan Ivanovych Osypenko (Ukrainian: Руслан Іванович Осипенко; born on 5 August 1978), is a Ukrainian politician who is currently the Governor of Chernivtsi Oblast since 8 January 2026.

== Biography ==
Ruslan Osypenko was born on 5 August 1978 in the city of Artemivsk (present-day Kypuche) of the Luhansk Oblast to a family of miners.

In 1996, after graduating from school, he entered the Kyiv Institute of Internal Affairs at the National Academy of Internal Affairs, which he graduated in 2000. He then started serving in the internal affairs bodies the same year. He has worked in the following positions: operational commissioner of criminal investigation, head of the criminal investigation department, deputy chief-chief of the criminal police, chief of the Shevchenkiv District Department of the Criminal Police Department in Kyiv, deputy chief of the Criminal Investigation Department in Cherkasy Oblast-chief of the criminal police.

In 2005, he graduated from the National Academy of Internal Affairs.

In 2016, he obtained the scientific degree of candidate of legal sciences from the National Academy of Sciences, specializing in "Criminal process and criminology; forensic examination; operational and search activity".

In 2021, he performed the duties of the head of the GUNP in the Kherson Oblast. On 26 November, by order of the Head of the National Police of Ukraine, he was appointed the head of the Main Directorate of the National Police in the Donetsk Oblast.

In 2022, he was earned police general of the third rank.

On 8 January 2026, Osypenko became the Governor of Chernivitsi Oblast.
