= Serhii Bondarchuk =

Ukrainian politician and security officer

Hero of Ukraine Serhii Bondarchuk OS
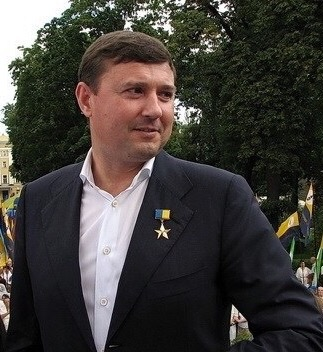
- Born: Serhii Vasyliovych Bondarchuk; 31 October 1971 (age 54); Kyiv, USSR
- Status: As of 2019, fugitive
- Citizenship: Ukraine
- Education: Taras Shevchenko National University of Kyiv; Higher Combined Arms Command School
- Occupations: political activist; former officer of the Security Service of Ukraine
- Awards: Hero of Ukraine

Serhii Bondarchuk (Ukrainian: Сергі́й Васи́льович Бондарчу́к; born 31 October 1971) is a Ukrainian civic and political activist, officer of the Security Service of Ukraine, and Hero of Ukraine.

== Awards ==
- Hero of Ukraine (with the award of the Order of the State, February 18, 2010 - “for outstanding personal merits to the Ukrainian state in the development of military-technical cooperation, increasing the international authority of Ukraine, many years of fruitful work”). The title was given for assistance in strengthening Georgia's defense capacity during the Russian aggression.
- Order of Vakhtang Gorgasal, I Degree (State award of Georgia. Foreign citizens who have shown courage and self-sacrifice in the struggle for independence and territorial integrity of Georgia can be awarded with this Order. November 5, 2013 - “for special services to the people and homeland, for defense and self-sacrifice”).

== Links ==
Official Facebook
