= Oleksandr Kolesnikov =

Ukrainian politician (1949–2026)

- Олександр Колесніков
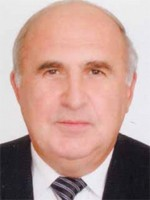
- Kolesnikov in 2021

Governor of Poltava Oblast
- In office 3 June 1998 – 2 November 1999
- Preceded by: Mykola Zaludyak
- Succeeded by: Anatoliy Kukoba

Personal details
- Born: Oleksandr Oleksandrovych Kolesnikov; 30 August 1949 Cottbus, Brandenburg, Soviet-occupied Germany
- Died: 8 July 2026 (aged 76)
- Party: CPSU (until 1991)
- Education: Kharkiv Institute of Radio Electronics
- Occupation: Electrician

Oleksandr Oleksandrovych Kolesnikov (Ukrainian: Олекса́ндр Олекса́ндрович Колесніков; 30 August 1949 – 8 July 2026) was a Ukrainian politician. He served as governor of Poltava Oblast from 1998 to 1999.

Kolesnikov died on 8 July 2026, at the age of 76.
