= Eleonora Vinogradova =

Ukrainian music educator and choir director

Eleonora Vinogradova Елеонора Виноградова
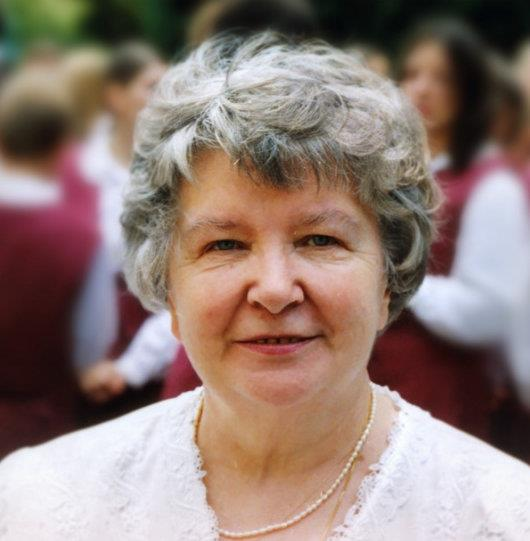

Background information
- Born: November 16, 1931; Grozny, Russian SFSR, Soviet Union
- Died: July 17, 2003 (aged 71) Kyiv, Ukraine
- Occupations: Choir director; Music teacher

Eleonora Oleksiivna Vinogradova (Note: Ukrainian: Елеонора Олексіївна Виноградова, romanized: Eleonora Oleksiivna Vynohradova; Russian: Элеонора Алексеевна Виноградова, romanized: Eleonora Alekseyevna Vinogradova) (November 16, 1931 – July 17, 2003) was a Ukrainian choir director, educator, professor, Honored Artist of Ukraine (since 1978).

== Biography ==
Eleonora Vinogradova was born in Grozny. In 1965, she graduated from the Kiev Conservatory (class of Eleonora Skrypchynska), and in 1965 she became a teacher there. From 1966, she was a main chorus artistic director of the Boys' and Young Men's Choir "Dzvinochok" of the Kyiv Palace of Pioneers and Schoolchildren. In 1975, Vinogradova founded “Tonika”, a center of directors, choirmasters and composers. She was a Head of this Center till 1990. In 1983–1986 she was a chorus artistic director and chief conductor of the children choir "Lubystok" under the Kiev Conservatory. In 1986–1997 she was an artistic director and chief conductor of the Boys' Choir in Kyiv Secondary Specialized Music Boarding School named after Mykola Lysenko. In 1997–2003 she was an artistic director and chief conductor of the Children's Choir “Cantus” of Kyiv Musical School No. 5 named after Levko Revutsky. She was an outstanding Ukrainian choir conductor, Professor of the Ukrainian National Tchaikovsky Academy of Music, Honored Artist of Ukraine.

Vinogradova was a compiler and editor of 15 collected books for children choirs

She died in Kyiv in 2003.
