= Kozhaniy Olen' =

Ukraine ska-punk band

Kozhaniy Olen' (English: Leather Deer) is the Ukrainian ska-punk band from Simferopol, created in 1998.

== History ==
The band was started by a future trumpeter Pavel Shvets and the guitarist Andrey Zamotaylov in 1998 while still studying at school. The texts of the songs of the collective in particular contain obscene expressions and pornography themes, the name of their debut album – «17.5 cm» (2004). The first official video for the song titled ОРЗ was presented on Sep 26, 2009 on «Enter Music». The song is about non-traditional approach to the treatment of influenza and other respiratory ailments.

== Members of group ==
- Andrey Zamotaylov – rhythm guitar, vocals, the founder of the band
- Pavel «PapaJoe» Shvets – trumpet, backing vocals, songwriter, the founder of the band
- Eugene «Slamp» Zavaliy – solo-guitar, backing vocals
- Alexey «insa» Strebkov – drums
- Yury Fateykin – bass guitar, backing vocals

== Discography ==
- 2004 — 17,5 см
- 2010 — Триста баксов и дорога
- 2013 — Снегири и Суперклей
- 2017 — Кашель Нины

== Music videos ==
- ОРЗ (2009)

== Singles ==
- "ОРЗ" (2004)
- "Afanasy" (2004)
- "Monika" (2004)
- "Rape me" (Nirvana cover) (2009)
- "Jopa" (2009)
- "8 марта" (2012)
