= Yevhen Zhovtyak =

Ukrainian politician

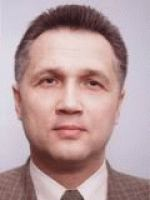
Yevhen Zhovtyak

Yevhen Zhovtyak (Ukrainian: Євген Дмитрович Жовтяк; born 19 March 1961) is a Ukrainian politician.

== Early life ==
Zhovtyak was born on 19 March 1961 in the village of Rudnyky, which was thehn part of the Ukrainian SSR in the Soviet Union. In 1984, he graduated Kharkiv Aviation Institute (KhAI) as a mechanical engineer. After graduation Zhovtyak worked as a design engineer at the Zhulyany Engineering Factory in Vyshneve, specializing in the production of missiles for the Soviet S-300 missile system. He later became a master of production preparation at the plant, before becoming an engineer-economist for the cooperative Teplotekhnika while simultaneously serving as Head of the Department of Planning for the Kyiv Experimental Production‑Advertising Combine. From 1992 to 1993 he was Head of the Sector for Entrepreneurship for the Kyiv-Sviatoshyn Raion Administration.

In 1993, Zhovtyak received a graduate degree in state administration from the Cabinet of Ministers of Ukraine Institute of State Administration and Self-Government. While studying in the institute, he worked as a chief specialist for the Department of Property and Entrepreneurship for the Cabinet of Ministers.

== Political career ==
He was a member of the Ukrainian parliament in 1994–2005 (2nd, 3rd, and 4th convocations). Being a politician of People's Movement of Ukraine and Ukrainian People's Party, Zhovtyak was elected from his constituency in Kyiv Oblast (Kyiv-Sviatoshyn Raion). While being a member of parliament, in 1999 he also received a law degree from the Yaroslav Mudryi National Law University in Kharkiv.

Following the so-called Orange Revolution in Ukraine, in 2005–2006 he served as a Governor of Kyiv Oblast.

From 2006 to 2010 he was a Deputy of the Kyiv Oblast Council.

== Personal life ==
He is married to Alina Vasylivna, and together they have a daughter named Lidiya.
