= Mykola Shpak =

Ukrainian poet

- Микола Шпак
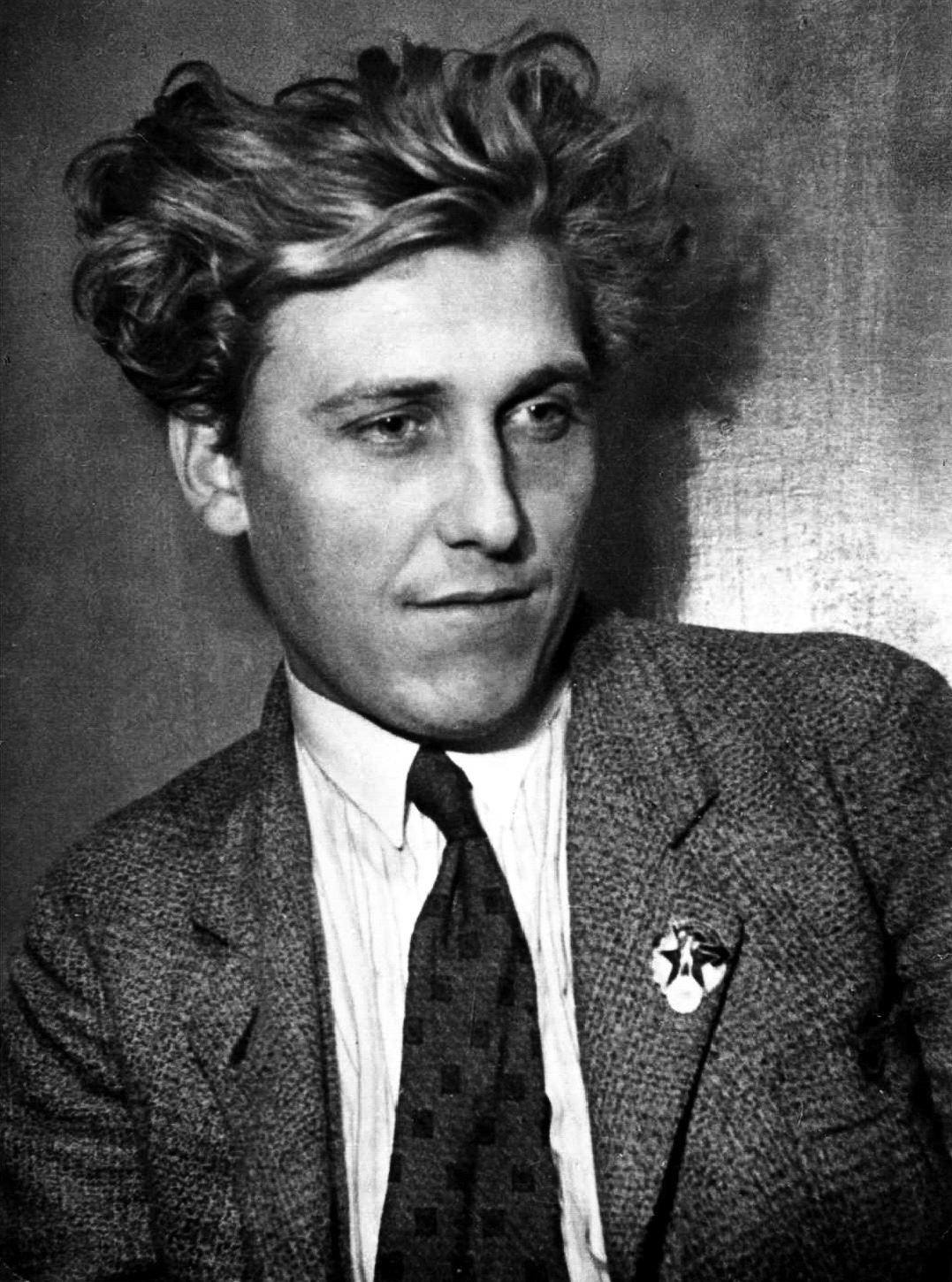
- Born: Mykola Ipolitovych Shpakivskyy; 23 February 1909; Lypky, Russian Empire
- Died: July 1942 (aged 33); Kyiv, Reichskommissariat Ukraine
- Citizenship: Soviet Union
- Occupations: poet, writer, translator
- Writing career
- Language: Ukrainian
- Years active: 1925 - 1942

Signature
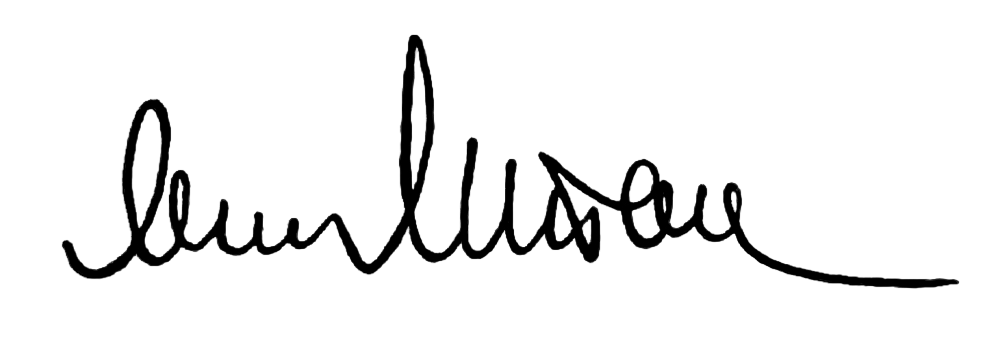

Mykola Shpak (real name Mykola Ipolitovych Shpakivskyy) (Ukrainian: Микола Шпак; 23 February 1909 – July 1942) was a Ukrainian poet, writer and translator. He also was a partisan during the German-Soviet war.

== Life ==
Mykola Shpakivskyy was born in the village of Lypky in Kiev Governorate (today Zhytomyr oblast) of the Russian Empire. His father was a farmer of szlachta origin. Shpakivskyy family used Odyniec coat of arms. After graduating from the seven-year school in 1926, he moved to Kyiv, where he studied at various universities for several years. Around these years, Mykola began to publish his poems in the magazine "Molodnyak" and other periodicals.

In 1930, he moved to Kharkiv to work in the editorial office. From 1931 to 1932, he was in the ranks of the Red Army, preparing for publication his first collection of poems. In 1933, he worked in Zaporizhzhia. In 1934, he became a member of the National Writers' Union of Ukraine, moved to Kyiv and devoted himself entirely to literary activities. During the six prewar years, he published collections of poetry, translated a lot and wrote for children. He also was the head of the publishing house "Ukrainian Worker" and worked as an editor in different magazines.

After the start of the German-Soviet war, Shpak worked for some time on the radio, wrote articles for newspapers and anti-Nazi leaflets. In summer, he fought near Kyiv in the ranks of the Soviet army, where he was surrounded and captured. He was placed in a Nazi concentration camp, but managed to escape and soon get to the Zhytomyr oblast, where he organized an underground resistance group and the partisan detachment "For freedom". In spring of 1942, the underground organization failed and the partisans, led by their leader, retreated into the forests. Mykola Shpak could no longer stay in his native village, so he went to occupied Kyiv, where hoped to establish a connection with the local underground. However, he did not succeed. On 19 July 1942, the poet was arrested in Kyiv and soon tortured to death by the Gestapo. The place of his burial is unknown.

Mykola Shpak was married with Zinaida Horbatenko, they had three daughters.

== Work ==
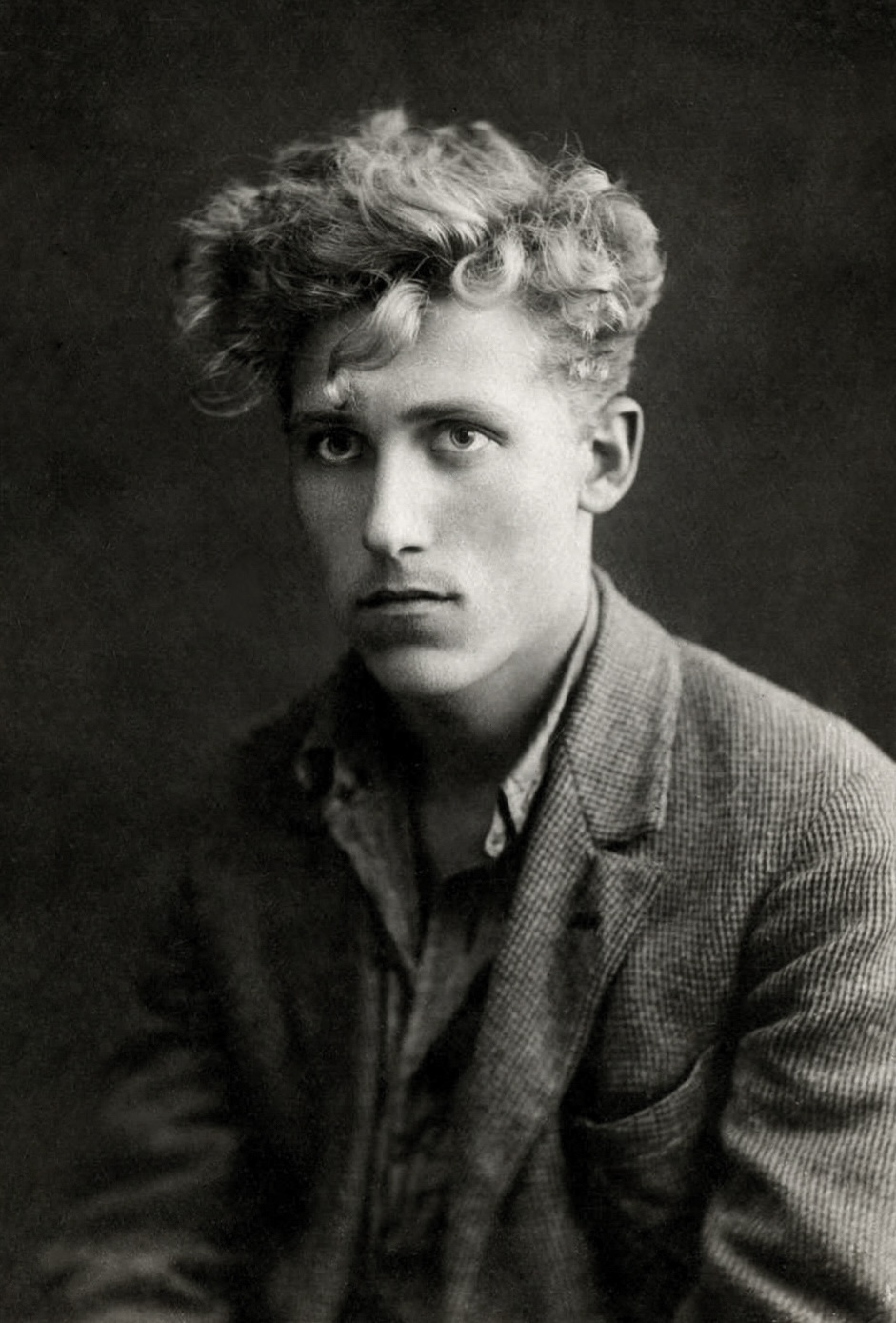
Mykola Shpak in his youth

Mykola Shpak began to write poetry at the age of sixteen. His lyric poetry of the prewar period concerns the Soviet Ukrainian countryside and people's life. During the Second World War he wrote sharp satirical poems directed against the Nazi aggressors. Shpak managed to publish five collections of poetry: "Report to Narkom" (1933), "On Watch" (1934), "My Love" (1936), "Wealth" (1938), "Power of the Earth" (1940). At the beginning of 1941, he prepared a collection of his selected poems "Beautiful ryes", but it was published only after the poet's death in 1947.

He also wrote short stories and improved his style as a translator (he translated the works of V. Mayakovsky, N. Nekrasov and others, folk songs).

Example of his work

Аероплани над селом,
Аероплани над селом
І павутинна тиха осінь.
Вже час сріблить землі чоло
Й моє каштанове волосся.

В просторах радість, теплота,
І в серці радість, теплота, —
Увесь я сонцем оповитий
Іду. Дорога золота
Біжить у степ, дощами змитий.

Translation:

Above the village aeroplanes,
Above the village aeroplanes
And autumn cobwebs on the air.
Time silvers earth’s fair brow again
And silvers, too, my chestnut hair.

In wide expanses — joy and warmth,
And in my heart are joy and warmth —
Embraced by sunlight, all a-strain
I stride. The golden road runs forth,
Straight through the steppe, all washed by rain.

== Legacy ==
- Street names and memorial plaques in Kyiv and Lypky
- Mykola Shpak Museum in Lypky
