= Yuriy Artemenko =

Ukrainian journalist and politician

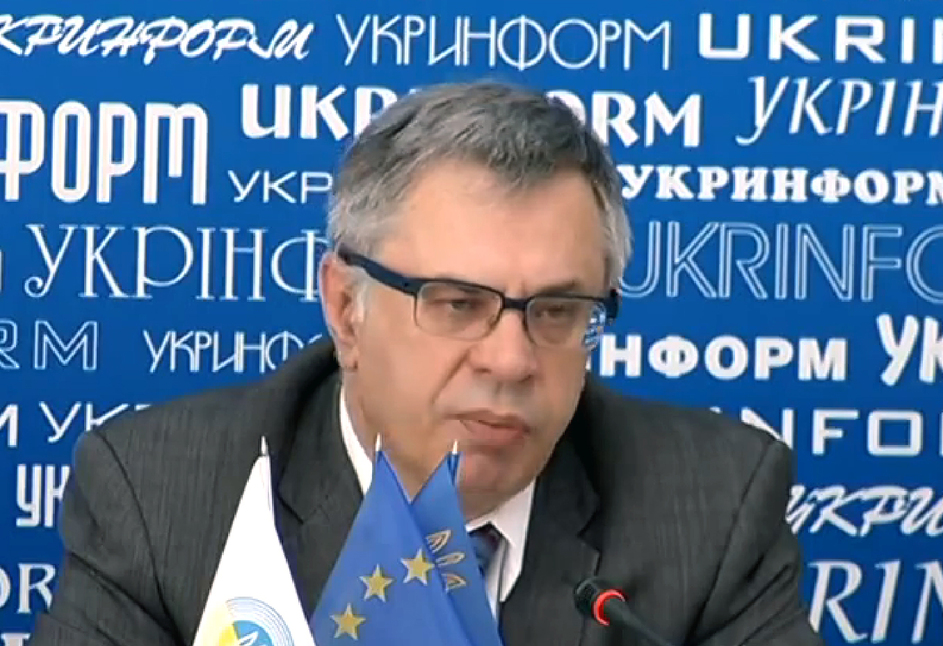

Yuriy Artemenko (born February 28, 1963) is a Ukrainian journalist, politician, and public figure. He served as a Deputy of Ukraine IV and V convocations and is a former governor of the Zaporizhzhya region, as well as a former Chairman of the National Television and Radio Broadcasting Council of Ukraine (from 2014 to 2019).

He is now a Ukrainian cinema producer.

== Biography ==
Artemenko was born in Zaporizhia, Ukraine. His parents were Anatolii (born 1926) and Jeugenia (born 1928). He was educated at Taras Shevchenko National University of Kyiv, Faculty of Journalism (1983-1989), at the Interregional Academy of Personnel Management (1999-2002), where he studied Law, and at Kyiv Polytechnic Institute (2010), where he studied Administrative Management.

His wife - Helen M. (1963 ) and son Denis (1992)

== Career ==
1983 - Trainee, 1983-1985. - Correspondent, 1985-1987. - Senior Correspondent, 1987-1991. - Department of Zaporozhia regional newspaper "Komsomolets Zaporozhia"

1991-1996. - Deputy Chief Editor from November 1996 - Editor in Chief - Executive Director from March 2002 to 2005 - the chief editor of the newspaper "MIG" (formerly "Komsomolets Zaporozhia").

In 1998-2000. was a member of the secretariat of Zaporozhia regional organization of the National Union of Journalists of Ukraine, was advisor to the International Fund IREX (program ProMedia); was elected Zaporozhia Regional Council (1998-2002).

From 2000 to 2002 - the general director of the publishing house "Keramist" Was a member of such political parties as "Solidarity" (a member of the political council), the People's Union "Nasha Ukraina" (member of the Board, in March 2005 - July 2007 - Head of Zaporizhia regional organization), now - no party affiliation.

In 2001-2005 Was the founder and board member and vice-president of the Ukrainian Association of Press publishers. He was a member of the Public Council under the State TV Committee of Ukraine (2008-2010. Chairman).

In 2013 - Chairman of the Board "TV channel" NBM-Radio, Kyiv

== State activity ==
Ukrainian deputy of the IV Convocation from April 2002 till July 2005, constituency No. 77, Zaporizhia region, a self-promoted. "For" 15.99%, 14 opponents.

At the time of elections, was on position of Chief Editor - Executive Director of newspaper "MIG", non-party.

Became A member of political party "Nasha Ukraina" between May 2002 and February 2004, do not belong to any fraction (February - September 2004), a member of "Nasha Ukraina" (from September 2004).

Deputy Chairman of the Committee on Freedom of Speech (from June 2002). Resigned parliamentary powers on July 7, 2005

February 4 - November 8, 2005 - Head of Zaporizhia Regional State Administration.

Ukrainian deputy of V convocation from April 2006 to November 2007 Unit "Our Ukraine», No. 55 in the list. At the time of election, temporarily not working, a member of party "Nasha Ukraina". A member of the Unit "Our Ukraine" (since April 2006).

Deputy Chairman of the Committee on Environmental Policy, Natural Resources and Elimination of Consequences of Chornobyl Catastrophe (July 2006).

In 2008-2010. led the Public Council under the State Broadcasting Committee of Ukraine.

From July 2010 to June 2011. - Deputy Minister of Culture and Tourism of Ukraine, was in charge of tourism and the football championship Euro-2012.

In October 2011, he passed the exams and received a certificate of the right to practice law (decision of the Kyiv City Council of Professional Qualifications No. 4715 of 25.10.2011).

From 2013 - Freelance Advisor to the Minister of Foreign Affairs of Ukraine.

July 7, 2014 President of Ukraine appointed chairman of the National television and radio broadcasting council of Ukraine. He resigned from this position on May 4, 2019.

In 2015, the National Council of Ukraine on Television and Radio Broadcasting, headed by Yuriy Artemenko, removed from the national airwaves more than 10 Russian TV channels, as well as foreign films and programs featuring persons who called for war, aggressive actions or their propaganda. In 2015-2016, efforts were made to expand television and radio broadcasting in the ATO area and the temporarily occupied Crimea. In addition, the National Council under the leadership of Yuriy Artemenko carefully monitors the fulfillment of quotas for Ukrainian songs and language by domestic radio stations.In general, during 2015-2019, the National Council under the leadership of Yuriy Artemenko removed more than 70 Russian TV channels from the Ukrainian airwaves.

Since June 2019 - Vice President of the international film company Star Media. In February 2022, after the beginning of Russia's full-scale invasion, he resigned from this position.

Since 2020 - Chairman of the Supervisory Board of the Karpenko-Kary Kyiv National University of Theater, Cinema and Television.

Executive Secretary of the Supervisory Board of the Bogomolets National Medical University.

From 2021 to 2024, he acted as Chairman of the Supervisory Board of the Ukrainian Cultural Foundation

Co-founder of the International Franco-Ukrainian Film Company “Apple Tree Vision.”

Co-founder of the Ukrainian Production Hub. He has produced more than 12 feature films and television series, including The Last Mercenary for Netflix with Jean Claude Van Damme, SHTTL, which won many international film festivals, and Road to Berlin, a film about singer Andriy Kuzmenko (Scriabin) that became one of the highest-grossing films in the history of modern Ukraine.

== Awards and recognition ==
Best journalist of the year in Zaporizhzhia region (1988)

“Person of the Year” award in Zaporizhzhia region (1999)

“Teletriumph” (a special award of the National Council on Television and Radio Broadcasting of Ukraine) - for personal contribution to the development of television in Ukraine (2005)

“Badge of Honor” (award of the Ministry of Defense of Ukraine)

The award of the President of Ukraine Viktor Yushchenko “Guardian of the Revolution”, I degree.

Awarded the badge of the Ministry of Culture and Tourism of Ukraine. “Honorary Worker of Tourism of Ukraine” (Resolution of the MCT Board No. 5/24 of 18.05.2011)

Awarded the Order of Isabela the Catholic (Decree of the King of Spain dated 23.07.2013)

Honored Journalist of Ukraine (2013).

Civil servant of the 1st rank - since 2007 (Decree of the Chairman of the Verkhovna Rada of Ukraine No. 1326 of 23.11.2007)

The Focus magazine ranked Artemenko No. 85 in the “100 Most Influential Ukrainians of 2014” rating.

Order of Prince Yaroslav the Wise, V century (November 15, 2016)

Chairman of the Supervisory Board of the I. K. Karpenko-Kary Kyiv National University of Theater, Cinema and Television (2020)

Executive Secretary of the Supervisory Board of the Bogomolets National Medical University

Member of the Supervisory Board of the Ukrainian Cultural Foundation (2021-2024)
