= Serhiy Ryzhuk =

Ukrainian politician

- Сергій Рижук
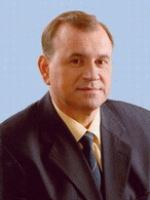

Governor of Zhytomyr Oblast
- In office 11 January 2004 – 3 February 2005
- Preceded by: Mykola Rudchenko
- Succeeded by: Pavlo Zhebrivskyi
- In office 18 March 2010 – 2 March 2014
- Preceded by: Yuriy Zabela
- Succeeded by: Sydir Kizin

Ministry of Agrarian Policy
- In office 2002 – 11 January 2004
- Preceded by: Ivan Kyrylenko
- Succeeded by: Viktor Slauta

Personal details
- Born: 20 January 1950 (age 76) Chudniv, Chudniv Raion, Ukrainian SSR
- Party: Party of Regions
- Education: Zhytomyr National Agro-Ecological University; NAASU Institute of Land Cultivation

Serhiy Mykolaiovych Ryzhuk (Ukrainian: Сергій Миколайович Рижук; born 20 January 1950) is a Ukrainian politician, member of the Verkhovna Rada.

== Early life ==
Ryzhuk was born on 20 January 1950 in Chudniv, which was then part of the Ukrainian SSR in the Soviet Union. In 1975, he graduated from the Zhytomyr National Agro-Ecological University with a specialty as an economist-organizer. Afterwords, he began his career as an economist of the collective farm of Ostrovsky withhin Chudniv. However, he soon switched his career to work in politics after this position.

== Political career ==
He first worked as an instructor of the Zhytomyr Regional Committee from 1976 to 1979, and was then promoted to being a second then first secretary of the same committee up until 1983. He was then transferred to being first secretary of the northern Yemilchyne Raion within Zhytomyr Oblast, before returning to being an inspector of the central committee. Up until the collapse of the Soviet Union, he worked as the First Deputy Head of the Agricultural Department of the Central Committee.

Following its collapse, he worked within the newly formed Ministry of Agrarian Policy as its deputy head until 1992. He then became director of the state cooperative association "Ukragroform" until 1996, before becoming briefly an assistant to President Leonid Kuchma. He returned to the Ministry of Agrarian Policy to become Deputy Minister of the Agro-Industrial Complex and then State Secretary of the ministry up until 2002. In 2002, he was promoted to Minister of Agrarian Policy in the cabinet of Viktor Yanukovych, which he did until 2004.

In 2004-2005 he also served as a Governor of Zhytomyr Oblast.

In 2006-2010 Ryzhuk was a member of the Verkhovna Rada representing Party of Regions.

In 2010-2014 he again served as a Governor of Zhytomyr Oblast.
