= Volodymyr Kuratchenko =

Soviet economist and politician

Volodymyr Oleksandrovych Kuratchenko (ukr. Куратченко Володимир Олександрович, born on 28 April 1948) - Ukrainian statesman and politician, First Vice Prime Minister of Ukraine (1999), Head of the State Committee for Reserves, Head of the Zaporizhia Regional State Administration.

== Biography ==
Graduated from Zaporizhzhya Machine-Building Institute (1983, radio engineering) and Academy of Social Sciences under the Central Committee of the CPSU (1990). Candidate of Economic Sciences (1990) "Development of the main provisions of the concept of creation and operation of a special economic zone in the Transcarpathian region of the USSR."

From 1969 to 1985 Kuratchenko worked at the plant "Radioprilad" in Zaporizhzhya. Since 1985 - secretary of the Zaporizhia City Committee of the Communist Party on Industry.

July 1990 to January 1997 - General Director of the Zaporozhye Production Association "Radioprilad".

In 1998 until January 1999 - head of Zaporizhia Regional State Administration.

From 14 January 1999 to 31 July 1999 - First Vice Prime Minister of Ukraine

From 2001 to 2003 - Chairman of the State Committee of Ukraine from the state material reserve
