= Anatoliy Kukoba =

Ukrainian politician

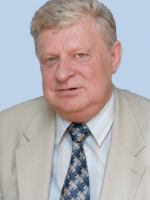
Кукоба Анатолій Тихонович

Anatoliy Kukoba (Ukrainian: Анатолій Тихонович Кукоба; 8 November 1948, Poltava – 17 January 2011) was a Ukrainian politician and the first mayor of Poltava.

== See also ==
- List of mayors of Poltava
