= Mykhailo Romaniv =

Ukrainian politician (born 1956)

- Михайло Романів

Governor of Chernivisti Oblast
- In office 7 March 2014 – 21 March 2014
- Preceded by: Mykhailo Papiyev
- Succeeded by: Roman Vanzuryak
- In office 25 July 2003 – 21 January 2005
- Preceded by: Teofil Bauer
- Succeeded by: Mykola Tkach

Personal details
- Born: Mykhailo Vasylovych Romaniv; 30 July 1956 (age 70) Korniv, Ukrainian SSR, Soviet Union (now Ukraine)
- Party: People's Party (Ukraine) (since 2008)

Mykhailo Vasylovych Romaniv (Ukrainian: Михайло Васильович Романів; born on 30 July 1956), is a Ukrainian politician who served as the Governor of Chernivtsi Oblast twice, first from July 2003 to January 2005 and later in March 2014.

He holds advanced academic qualifications as a candidate of economic sciences and doctor of philosophy, is an associate professor, and has served on the editorial board of the journal "Finance of Ukraine".

== Early life and education ==
Mikhailo Romaniv was born on 30 July 1956 in Korniv, Ivano-Frankivsk Oblast, to his father Vasyl Mikhailovych (1930 - 1979), and mother Anastasiya Petrivna (1929 - 2002).

He graduated from Chernivtsi State University in 1983 with a degree in finance

== Career ==
From 1973 to 1974, Romaniv worked as a turner at the Graviton plant in Chernivtsi. He then studies at the Chernivtsi Financial College from 1974 to 1978, with a two-year interruption for service in the Soviet Army. After graduating, he remained at the college as a senior personnel inspector from 1978 to 1979.

He subsequently held positions in regional finance administration, serving as deputy and later head of the Pervomaisky District Financial Department between 1979 and 1988. From 1988 to 1990, he was deputy chief comptroller-inspector of the Ministry of Finance for the Chernivtsi region. Between 1990 and 1996, he advanced to deputy head and head of the financial department, and also served as deputy chairman of the Chernivtsi regional state administration.

Between 1996 and 2003, Romaniv worked in the Ministry of Finance of Ukraine in Kyiv, where he held roles including head of a department, deputy head of the Main Control and Audit Directorate, and head of the Control and Auditing Department. During this period, he was also elected to the Chernivtsi Oblast Council for its 3rd and 4th convocations.

On 25 July 2003, Romaniv was appointed Governor of Chernivtsi Oblast. He resigned on 20 January 2005 alongside several other regional administrators, formally leaving office on 21 January. Following his resignation, he served as director of the Chernivtsi Economic and Legal Institute.

In October 2007, Romaniv was appointed head of the Main Directorate of the Pension Fund of Ukraine in the Chernivtsi Oblast. The following year, he was elected chairman of the regional organization of the People's Party.

On 15 March 2014, acting President Olkesandr Turchynov appointed him governor for a second term. His appointment prompted protests from activists of Self-Defense and Right Sector, who criticised his previous political affiliations. Following discussions with protesters, Romaniv submitted his resignation, and on 21 March, a new decree appointed Roman Vanzuryak to the post, effectively replacing him.

== Academic work ==
He is the author of more than 30 scientific works, including monographs: "State financial control and audit" (1998), "Modern Bukovyna: 1991-2005 in the results of the socio-economic and political development of the region" (2006).

== Personal life ==
His wife, Mariya Epifanivna (born in 1959), works as a financier. The couple has two children: a son, Mikhailo (born 1979), who is an engineer, and a daughter, Yuliya (born 1983), who is an economist and journalist. Romaniv enjoys singing.
