= Governor of Zaporizhzhia Oblast =

Head of Military Civil Administration of Zaporizhzhia Oblast
- Seal of Zaporizhzhia Oblast

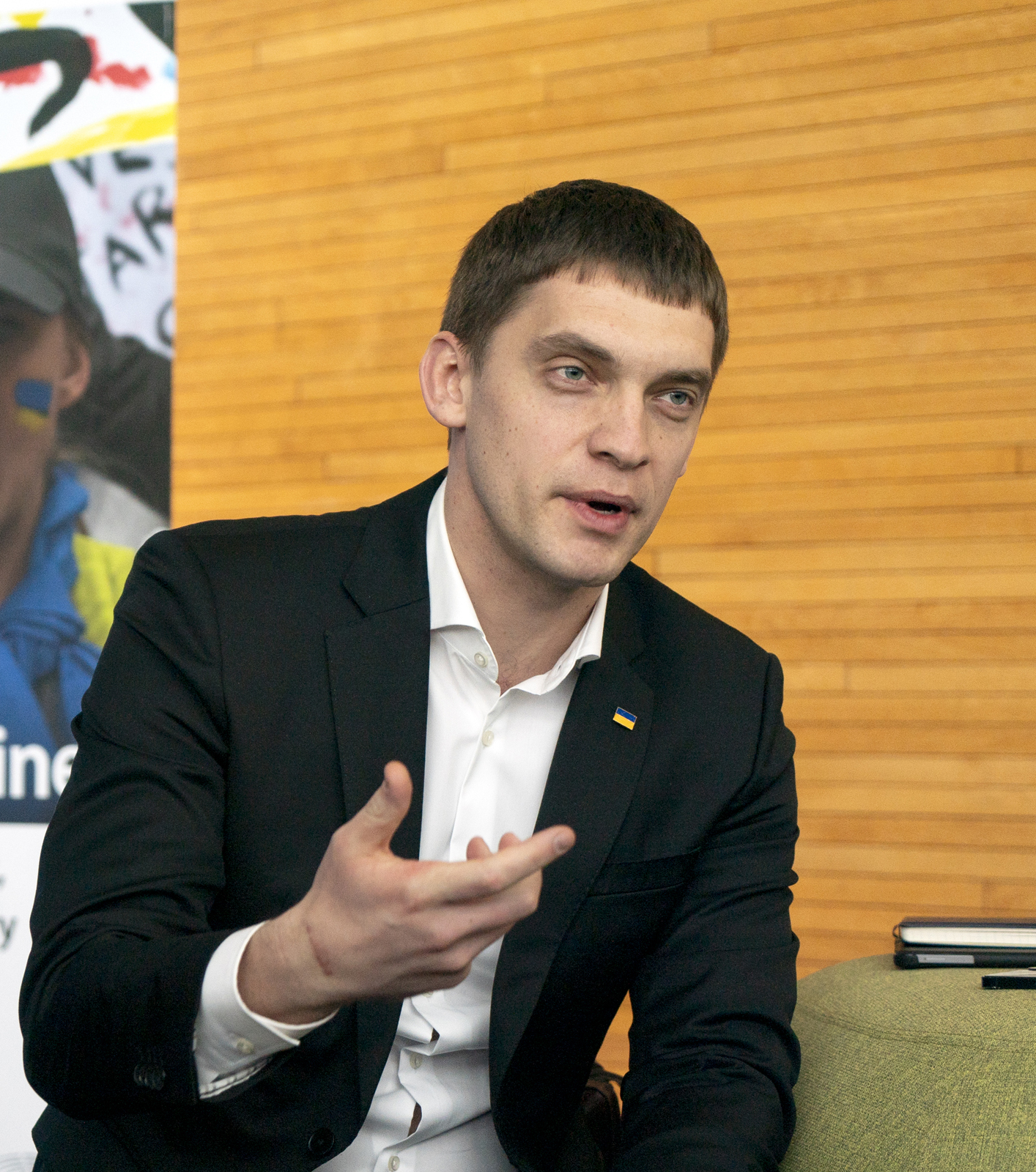
- Incumbent; Ivan Fedorov since 4 February 2024 disputed with Yevgeny Balitsky (Note: Control over Zaporizhzhia Oblast is disputed due to the 2022 Russian invasion of Ukraine. Balitsky was installed by Russia on 9 May 2022, while Fedorov remains loyal to the Ukrainian government.)
- Residence: Zaporizhzhia
- Term length: Four years
- Inaugural holder: Danylo Lezhenko; 1939
- Formation: 1939 as Chairman of Executive Committee of Zaporizhzhia Oblast
- Website: Government of Zaporizhzhia Oblast

The governor of Zaporizhzhia Oblast is the head of state administration for the Zaporizhzhia Oblast.

The office of governor is an appointed position, with officeholders being appointed by the president of Ukraine, on recommendation from the prime minister of Ukraine, to serve a four-year term.

Due to the current Russo-Ukrainian war, since 24 February 2022, the governor of Zaporizhzhia Oblast is officially called Head of the Zaporizhzhia Regional Military Civil Administration. The official residence for the governor is located in Zaporizhzhia. As a result of the Russian occupation of Zaporizhzhia Oblast and the subsequent disputed referendum, there are now competing Russian and Ukrainian governors.

== Governors ==
=== Chairman of Executive Committee of Zaporizhzhia Oblast ===
- Danylo Lezhenko (1939)
- Zakhar Dorofeyev (1940–1941)
- Nazi German occupation (1941–1943)
- Zakhar Dorofeyev (1943–1944)
- Vasyl Ponomarenko (1944–1950) (Note: Acting to May 31, 1944)
- Mykola Titov (1950–1951)
- Vasyl Ponomarenko (1951–1952)
- Volodymyr Skryabin (1952–1957)
- Fedir Mokrous (1957–1963)
- Oleksandr Guyva (1963–1964) (Note: For Agriculture)
- Pavlo Sklyarov (1963–1964) (Note: For Industry)
- Fedir Mokrous (1964–1969)
- Mykhailo Khorunzhy (1969–1976)
- Petro Moskalkov (1976–1988)
- Volodymyr Demyanov (1988–1992)

=== Representatives of the President ===
- Volodymyr Demyanov (1992)
- Yurii Bochkarev (1992–1994)

=== Chairman of the Executive Committee ===
- Vyacheslav Pokhvalsky (1994–1995)

=== Heads of the Administration ===
- Vyacheslav Pokhvalsky (1995–1998)
- Volodymyr Kuratchenko (1998–1999)
- Yevhen Kartashov (1999)
- Volodymyr Kuratchenko (1999–2000)
- Oleksii Kucherenko (2000–2001)
- Serhiy Sazonov (2001) (acting)
- Yevhen Kartashov (2001–2003)
- Volodymyr Berezovsky (2003–2005)
- Yuriy Artemenko (2005)
- Anatolii Holovko (2005) (acting)
- Yevhen Chervonenko (2005–2007)
- Valeriy Cherkaska (2007–2008) (acting)
- Oleksandr Starukh (2008–2010) (Note: Acting to September 25, 2008)
- Borys Petrov (2010–2011)
- Oleksandr Peklushenko (2011–2014)
- Valeriy Baranov (2014)
- Hryhoriy Samardak (2014–2015) (acting)
- Valentyn Reznichenko (2015)
- Hryhoriy Samardak (06.04.2015–18.12.2015)
- Kostiantyn Bryl (2016–2019)
- Ella Slepyan (11.06.2019–05.09.2019) (acting)
- Vitaliy Turynok (2019–2020)
- Vitaliy Bohovin (2020)
- Oleksandr Starukh (2020–2023)
- Yuriy Malashko (2023–2024)
- Ivan Fedorov (2024–present)

== See also ==
- Zaporizhzhia Regional Committee of the Communist Party of Ukraine
