= Anatoliy Zasukha =

Ukrainian politician

- Анатолій Засуха
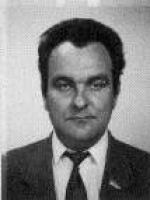

Chairman of the Kyiv Oblast Council
- In office 9 December 2004 – 1 February 2005
- Preceded by: Mykola Pryimachenko
- Succeeded by: Mykola Pryimachenko (acting)
- In office November 2000 – 6 September 2001
- Preceded by: Mykola Baranyuk
- Succeeded by: Mykola Baranyuk

Governor of Kyiv Oblast
- In office 22 September 1996 – 19 January 2005
- Preceded by: Vasyl Sinko
- Succeeded by: Yevhen Zhovtyak

People's Deputy of Ukraine

2nd convocation
- In office 11 May 1994 – 10 July 1997

Personal details
- Born: 13 June 1958 (age 66); Polohy, Vasylkiv Raion, Kyiv Oblast, Ukrainian SSR, Soviet Union

Anatoliy Andriyovych Zasukha (Ukrainian: Анатолій Андрійович Засуха; born 13 June 1958) is a Ukrainian politician. Chairman of the Kyiv Oblast State Administration (1996-2005), former chairman of the Kyiv Oblast Council (2000-2001) and (2004-2005).

== Career ==
He began his career in 1975 as a student of the Bila Tserkva branch of the Ukrainian Training Complex.

After serving in the Soviet Army (1976-1978), he entered the Bila Tserkva Agricultural Institute, graduating in 1984 with a degree in agronomy.

From 1984 to 1985, he worked as an agronomist, secretary of the party organization of the collective farm 40 years of October Vasylkivsky Raion (Kyiv Oblast), and from 1985 to 1993 worked as a chairman of the collective farm named after Shchors. In 1993–1995, he was the First Deputy Minister of Agriculture and Food of Ukraine.

=== Political career ===
From 1994 to 1997, Anatoliy was People's Deputy of Ukraine of the 2nd convocation. From 11 October 1995 to 24 September 1996, Chairman of the State Committee of Ukraine for Land Resources.

From 1996 to 2005, Anatoliy was the Head of the Kyiv Oblast State Administration.

In 2005, Tetiana stated that someone wanted to kill Anatoliy Zasukha.

He was declared internationally wanted in 2005 after being involved in several criminal cases on suspicion of abuse of power and forgery. Since 2006 he has been working as Deputy Governor of the Moscow Region Boris Gromov.

In 2006 the criminal case against him was closed. At the request of the Ministry of Internal Affairs of Ukraine, the search in Interpol was also terminated. He returned to Ukraine in 2008.

== Personal life ==
His wife Tetiana is the owner of Agrofirm Svitanok head-quartered in a village Kovalivka, Kyiv Oblast. She holds Hero of Ukraine award. Tetiana is the ex-deputy of the Kyiv Oblast Council (1994 - 1998) and the member of the Verkhovna Rada of Ukraine in III and VI convocations.

His son Andrii is the owner of FC Kolos Kovalivka.
