= Governor of Chernivtsi Oblast =

- Seal of Chernivtsi Oblast

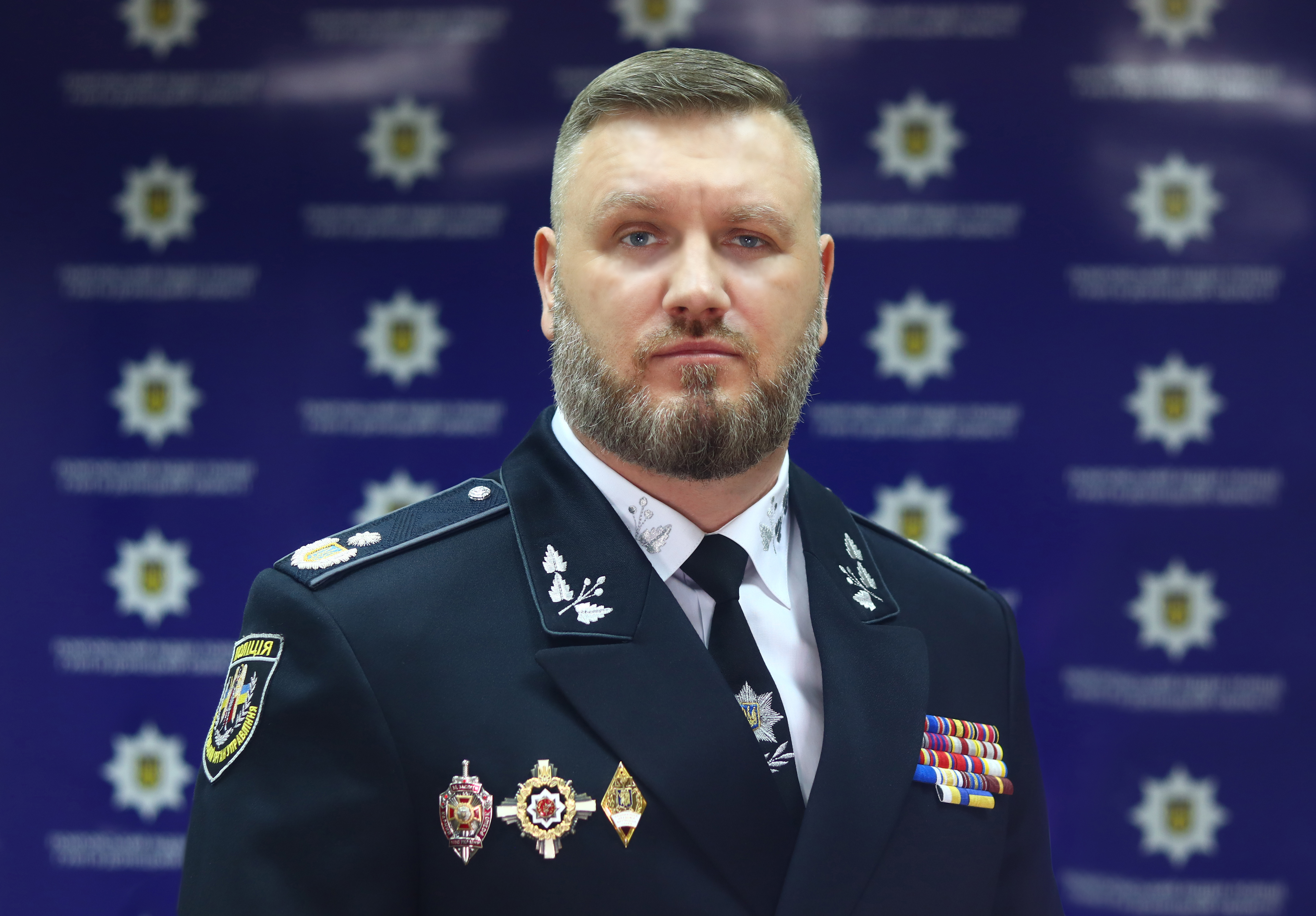
- Incumbent; Ruslan Osypenko since 8 January 2026
- Residence: Chernivtsi
- Term length: Four years
- Inaugural holder: Ivan Hnatyshyn; 1938
- Formation: 1992 as Presidential representative
- Website: Government of Chernivtsi Oblast

The governor of Chernivtsi Oblast is the head of executive branch for the Chernivtsi Oblast.

The office of governor is an appointed position, with officeholders being appointed by the president of Ukraine, on recommendation from the prime minister of Ukraine, to serve a four-year term. The head of the Chernivtsi Regional State Administration is responsible to the President of Ukraine and the Cabinet of Ministers of Ukraine in the exercise of his/her powers, and is accountable to and controlled by higher-level executive authorities.

The official residence for the governor is located in Chernivtsi. Since 22 November 2019 the governor is Serhiy Osachuk.

== Governors ==
- Ivan Hnatyshyn (1992–1994, as the Presidential representative)
- Ivan Hnatyshyn (1995–1996, as the Governor)
- Heorhiy Filipchuk (1996–1998)
- Teofil Bauer (1998–2003)
- Mykhailo Romaniv (2003–2005)
- Mykola Tkach (2005–2006)
- Volodymyr Kulish (2006–2010)
- Mykhailo Papiyev (2010–2014)
- Mykhailo Romaniv (2014)
- Roman Vanzuryak (2014)
- Ivan Rybak (2014, acting)
- Roman Marchuk (2014–2015, acting)
- Oleksandr Fyshchuk (2015–2018)
- Mykhaylo Pavlyuk (2018–2019, acting)
- Serhiy Osachuk (2019–2022)
- Ruslan Zaparanyuk (2022–2026)
- Ruslan Osypenko (2026–)

== Sources ==
- World Statesmen.org
