= Oleksandr Yefremov =

Ukrainian politician

- Олександр Єфремов
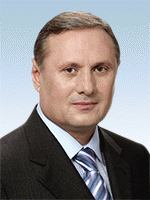

People's Deputy of Ukraine
- In office 25 May 2006 – 27 November 2014

Governor of Luhansk Oblast
- In office 7 April 1998 – 26 January 2006
- Preceded by: Hennadiy Fomenko
- Succeeded by: Oleksiy Danilov

Personal details
- Born: 22 August 1954 (age 72) Voroshylovhrad, Ukrainian SSR, Soviet Union (now Ukraine)
- Party: Party of Regions
- Education: East Ukraine Volodymyr Dahl National University

Oleksandr Serhiyovych Yefremov (Ukrainian: Олександр Сергійович Єфремов, Russian: Александр Сергеевич Ефремов, born on 22 August 1954) is a Ukrainian former parliamentarian and politician. A former governor of the Luhansk Oblast, from 2010 until 2014 he was Party of Regions's faction leader in the Verkhovna Rada (Ukraine's parliament).

On 14 February 2015 Yefremov was detained on suspicion of "abuse of power under aggravating circumstances". This arrest was effectively ended when his bail expired on 1 November 2015. Yefremov was again detained on 30 July 2016 on suspicion of violation of Ukraine's territorial integrity by helping to create the Luhansk People's Republic and misappropriation of property. He was released from prison pending investigation in 2019. Shortly after the February 2022 Russian invasion of Ukraine Yefremov moved to Moscow where he now resides.

== Biography ==
Yefremov was born in Voroshylovhrad on August 22, 1954, to an ethnic Russian family of Sergei Serafimovich Yefremov and Nadezhda Stepanovna. In 1973-1978 he studied and graduated from the Voloshylovhrad Machine-building Institute (today the East Ukraine Volodymyr Dahl National University) as engineer-mechanic. After graduating Yefremov became employed as an engineer-technologist at the Lenin Machine-building Plant in Luhansk. From October 1978 to April 1980 he served at the Kyiv Military District military site #68302, the 692nd Communication Unit of Civil Defense Headquarters (Pereyaslav-Khmelnytsky, Ukrainian SSR).

In 1980-1987 Yefremov worked as a Komsomol activist, until 1983 as the 1st secretary of the Leninsky Raion of Luhansk and then of the whole city. In 1987-1991 he was on managerial positions at the Lenin Machine-building Plant, deputy chief of department, sectary of party committee. During this time in 1990-92 Yefremov studied and graduated from the Kyiv Institute of Political Science and Social Administration as a political scientist. The institute was officially liquidated in March 1992.

In 1991-1996 Yefremov worked as a director of a local company "MSP Mega LTD". In 1996-1997 he was a chairman of the Board of Commercial Bank "Ukrainian Communal Bank" where his wife, Larysa, and son, Ihor, work. In 1997-98 Yefremov works as a deputy governor and from 7 April 1998, to 27 January 2005, as a governor of Luhansk Oblast as a member of the People's Democratic Party. During that time he also gained a magisterial diploma from the East Ukraine Volodymyr Dahl National University in 2000.

In 2005 Yefremov changed his political affiliation by the end of year headed the regional center of the Party of Regions. In 2006 he ran for seat in the Supreme Council of Ukraine as a member of the Party of Regions, while at the time being a director of regional administration of the Ukrainian Union of Industrialists and Entrepreneurs. Yefremov after being elected to the national parliament also was elected to the regional council as well. Since then he was a People's Deputy of Ukraine and was reelected to the parliament on two more occasions. From 2010 Yefremov heads the parliamentary faction of the Party of Regions changing on the post Viktor Yanukovych.

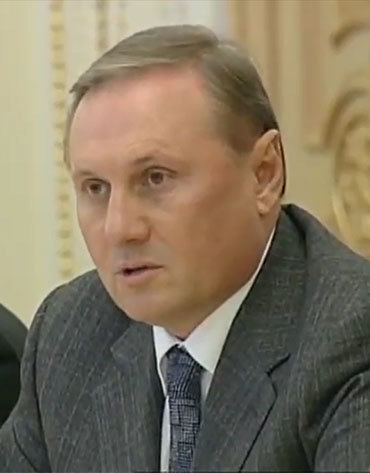
Yefremov in December 2012

On 14 September 2014, the Party of Regions choose not to participate in the 2014 Ukrainian parliamentary election; it deemed the election lacking legitimacy because the residents of the Donbas could not vote in the election. Although members of the Party of Regions took part in these elections on the election list of Opposition Bloc, Yefremov did not do so.

On 14 February 2015 Yefremov was detained on suspicion of "abuse of power under aggravating circumstances". Since 17 January 2015 (during the war in Donbas) Yefremov was part of an investigating into alleged involvement in funding separatism. This criminal case was closed on 31 March 2016. Yefremov was also suspected of putting pressure on state coal company Luganskugol to make it conclude contracts with service providers controlled by him for excessive prices. He is also accused of forgery of documents during the adoption on 16 January 2014 of a set of 'anti-protest laws'. On 18 February 2015 (after being released on bail) Yefremov stated that the authorities had fabricated the criminal case against him because "They just need someone to blame for the February 20 events" (on 20 February 2014 more than 100 Euromaidan participants and policemen were shot dead). On 25 February 2015 Yefremov was released on a $2,794 bail. This bail expired on 1 November 2015.

Yefremov was again detained on 30 July 2016 at Boryspil International Airport (he was about to fly to Vienna) on suspicion of violation of Ukraine's territorial integrity by helping to create the Luhansk People's Republic and misappropriation of property. On 1 August 2016 he was placed in custody. In June 2019 this arrest was extended to 17 August 2019. He was then released from custody but placed under house arrest. And then this preventive measure was changed to a personal commitment for two months, which was not extended after that.

On 23 October 2023 Radio Free Europe/Radio Liberty reported that Yefremov had left Ukraine after the beginning of the February 2022 Russian invasion of Ukraine through Slovakia and had not returned to Ukraine since then. Yefremov has settled in the residential complex Triumph Palace, in an elite neighbourhood in Moscow, Russia (this property is formally owned by his son, Ihor Yefremov). When journalists called Yefremov on his Russian number and asked what he was doing in Moscow and whether he planned to return to Ukraine, he answered: "You know, I have no plans to give any interviews now, goodbye." According to the office of the Prosecutor General of Ukraine in October 2023 Yefremov had no preventive measure applied against him and was not on the wanted list.

== Awards ==
- Order of Prince Yaroslav the Wise (2010)
- Order of Merit (III degree in 2001), (II - 2003), (I - 2004)
