= Governor of Zhytomyr Oblast =

Head of Regional State Administration of Zhytomyr Oblast
- Seal of Zhytomyr Oblast

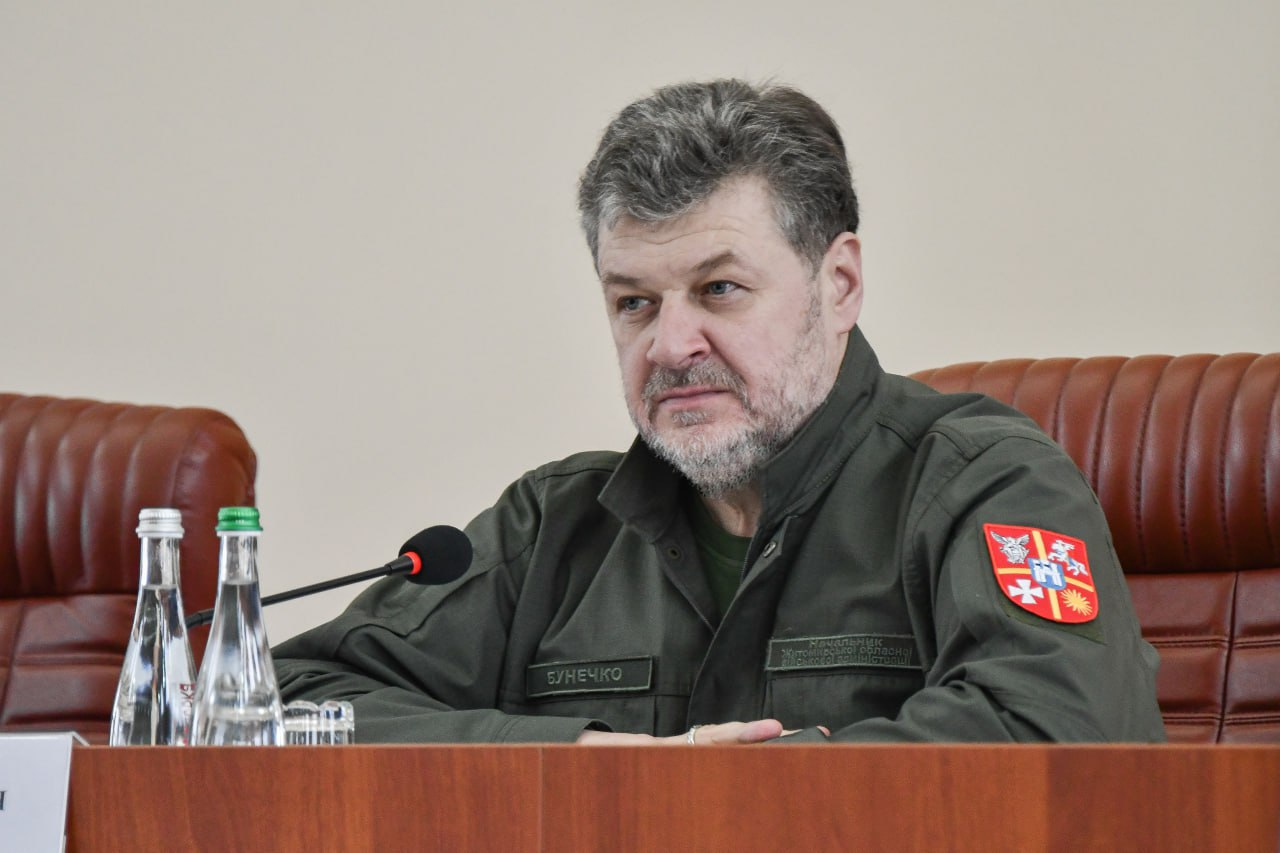
- Incumbent; Vitaliy Bunechko since 8 August 2019
- Residence: Zhytomyr
- Term length: Four years
- Inaugural holder: Anton Malynovskyi; 1940
- Formation: 1992 as Presidential representative
- Website: Government of Zhytomyr Oblast

The Head of Regional State Administration in Zhytomyr Oblast (Ukrainian: Голова Житомирської обласної державної адміністрації, Holova Zhytomyrskoyi oblasnoyi derzhavnoyi administratsiyi) is the head of executive branch for the Zhytomyr Oblast.

The office of head of Regional State Administration is an appointed position, with officeholders being appointed by the president of Ukraine, on recommendation from the prime minister of Ukraine, to serve a four-year term.

The official residence for the head of RSA is located in Zhytomyr. Since 8 August 2019 the head of RSA is Vitaliy Bunechko.

== Heads of RSA ==
- Anton Malynovskyi (1992–1994, as the Presidential representative)
- Anton Malynovskyi (1995–1998, as the Head of RSA)
- Volodymyr Lushkin (1998–2001)
- Mykola Rudchenko (2001–2004)
- Serhiy Ryzhuk (2004–2005)
- Pavlo Zhebrivskyi (2005)
- Iryna Synyavska (2005–2006)
- Volodymyr Zahryvyi (2006, acting)
- Yuriy Andriychuk (2006)
- Volodymyr Zahryvyi (2006, acting)
- Yuriy Pavlenko (2006–2007, acting to 2007)
- Yuriy Zabela (2007–2010, acting to 2007)
- Serhiy Ryzhuk (2010–2014)
- Sydir Kizin (2014)
- Serhiy Mashkovskyi (2014–2016)
- Ihor Hundych (2016–2019, acting to 2016)
- Yaroslav Lahuta (2019, acting)
- Vitaliy Bunechko (2019–)

== Sources ==
- World Statesmen.org
