= Mykola Soroka =

Ukrainian engineer and politician (1952–2024)

- Микола Сорока
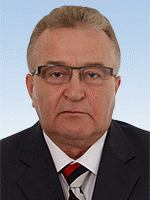

Governor of Rivne Oblast
- In office 19 February 1997 – 22 January 2005
- Preceded by: Roman Vasylyshyn
- Succeeded by: Vasyl Chervoniy

People's Deputy of Ukraine
- In office 12 December 2012 – 27 November 2014
- Preceded by: Position established (2012); Vasyl Yanitskyi (2014)
- Constituency: Rivne Oblast, No. 155 (2012–2014)

Personal details
- Born: 5 August 1952 Povchyne, Zhytomyr Oblast, Ukrainian SSR, USSR
- Died: 22 December 2024 (aged 72) Rivne, Ukraine
- Party: Party of Regions
- Education: Ukrainian Agricultural Academy

Mykola Soroka (Ukrainian: Микола Петрович Сорока; 5 August 1952 – 22 December 2024) was a Ukrainian mechanical engineer and politician who served as a governor of Rivne Oblast from 1997 to 2005 and a People's Deputy of Ukraine from 2012 to 2014.

== Life and career ==
Mykola Soroka was born in the village of Povchyne of Zhytomyr Oblast. In 1974, he graduated from the Ukrainian Agricultural Academy with a degree in "agricultural mechanical engineer". He worked as an engineer in various positions. He served as a governor of Rivne Oblast from February 1997 to January 2005. In 2012, he became the president of the National University of Water Management and Environmental Management and was elected as a People's Deputy of Ukraine from the "Party of Regions" in the 155th district.
