= Vadym Chuprun =

Ukrainian politician (born 1943)

- Вадим Чупрун

Governor of Donetsk Oblast
- In office 4 February 2005 – 3 May 2006
- President: Viktor Yushchenko
- Preceded by: Volodymyr Lohvynenko
- Succeeded by: Serhiy Derhunov

Chairman of the Donetsk Oblast Council
- In office 12 November 1992 – 10 July 1994
- Preceded by: Oleksii Petrenko
- Succeeded by: Volodymyr Shcherban

First Deputy Minister of Fuel and Energy
- In office 10 August 2006 – 9 January 2008
- President: Viktor Yushchenko

Ambassador of Ukraine to Turkmenistan
- In office 12 January 1995 – 9 July 2004
- President: Leonid Kuchma

Personal details
- Born: Vadym Prokopovych Chuprun; 5 January 1943 (age 83) Rivnopil, Ukrainian SSR, Soviet Union
- Other political affiliations: Communist Party of the Soviet Union
- Education: Melitopol Institute of Agricultural Mechanisation; Higher Party School at the Central Committee of the Communist Party of Ukraine

Vadym Prokopovych Chuprun (Ukrainian: Вадим Чупрун; born 5 January 1943) is a Ukrainian politician who served as Governor of Donetsk Oblast from 2005 to 2006 under President Viktor Yushchenko. Prior to this, he also served as Chairman of the Donetsk Oblast Council from 1992 to 1994 and as Ambassador of Ukraine to Turkmenistan from 1995 to 2004. After his appointment as governor he also served as First Deputy Minister of Fuel and Energy from 2006 to 2008 and Deputy Chairman of Naftogaz from 2008 to 2014.

== Early life ==
Chuprun was born on 5 January 1943 in the small village of Rivnopil, which was then part of the Ukrainian SSR in the Soviet Union. He is ethnically Ukrainian and is the son of Prokip, an accountant of the state farm "Donetsk", and Fenya Fedosiivna, a housewife. After graduating from secondary school, Chuprun initially worked as a worker at the farm "Donetsk" where his father worked, before deciding to pursue higher education at the Melitopol Institute of Agricultural Mechanisation. He graduated from the institute in 1966 with a certification to be an engineer-mechanic. He then became a mechanic at "Donetsk" and later a chief engineer there also in 1968. In 1971, he left "Donetsk" to become the head of the association "Agricultural Technology" within the Volnovakha Raion.

== Political career ==
In 1974, he entered politics, becoming the 2nd Secretary of the Volnovakha Raion Committee. After two years, he left, becoming a listener at the Higher Party School at the Central Committee of the Communist Party of Ukraine. After doing this for two years, he once again left and became 1st Secretary of the Artemivsk Raion Committee in 1978, which he did for a decade until 1988. In September 1988, he went to work as Head of the Agricultural Department for the Donetsk Oblast Committee until 1989 when he was promoted to Secretary of the Donetsk Oblast Committee. Chuprun did this up until the collapse of the Soviet Union. After its collapse, he was temporarily unemployed until he became Deputy General Director of the Donetsk Regional State Cooperative Production Association for Horticulture.

Chuprun returned to politics in November 1992, when he became Chairman of the Donetsk Oblast Council, after other proposals were shot down by the council, including Yuri Boldyrev. During his tenure, he worked on the council's relationship with the governor, who was then Yuriy Smyrnov, especially with regard to the ongoing 1990s Donbas miners' strikes. He also expressed a more middle-ground position during discussions about autonomy and federalisation, and while he lobbied for economic decentralisation, he preferred negotiating with the government and president. In 1994, he was ultimately dismissed from the position, largely in part because of newer political figures like Volodymyr Shcherban who had the backing of corporations, and also because of the media in the oblast saying he was too cautious and timid in attempting compromises during the strikes and economic stagnation.

After a couple of months, he was appointed Ambassador of Ukraine to Turkmenistan by President Leonid Kuchma, presenting his credentials on 12 January 1995. He would remain in this role for nearly a decade until May 2004, when he was dismissed by Kuchma. During his tenure, he was seen as warm to the President of Turkmenistan, Saparmurat Niyazov, calling him in an interview someone who worked for the sake of the people. He also worked with the supply of gas in Turkmenistan to Ukraine and continuing that relationship. After his dismissal in 2004, he became 1st Deputy Chairman of the Board of Naftogaz. He returned to politics not even a year later, when he was appointed Governor of Donetsk Oblast under President Viktor Yushchenko on 4 February 2005, although he said he himself did not know who recommended him to the president. Chuprun said he believes he was chosen because he was outside of typical Donetsk politics and that he had worked within politics prior during the Soviet era. After taking office, he said that the main thing would be working on the state of the oblast after the Orange Revolution and the issue of separatism following proposals in the aftermath of the Sievierodonetsk Congress. Eventually, Chuprun resigned early. This was the subject of initial controversy because Yuriy Yekhanurov announced it on 12 April, but Chuprun said he had never written a letter of early resignation but later retracted this and said he had written one of his own free will. His resignation was initially opposed by prominent figures in the Donbas, like Borys Kolesnikov and Oleksandr Lukyanchenko, with both calling it a political issue, especially in the aftermath of Yushchenko failing to clear 3% in oblast during the 2006 Ukrainian parliamentary election. Nevertheless, his resignation was confirmed by Yushchenko on 3 May 2006.

After a few months, he was appointed by Yushchenko to the post of First Deputy Minister of Fuel and Energy. He was one of five in this role and was tasked with the sector of gas. He stayed in this role for two years until January 2008. He took on this role during the gas dispute with Russia from 2007 to 2008. During the crisis, he said that Ukraine was not responsible for the unpaid debts, which Gazprom had threatened to cut off gas supplies to the country because of. After his dismissal in January 2008, he was appointed Deputy Chairman of Naftogaz in February. Chuprun maintained this role for many years until 5 April 2014. Most of his tenure in this role was related to the ongoing gas disputes with Russia, during which time he said it would be preferable to import gas from Central Europe over the more expensive Russian counterpart. He also advocated for increasing domestic gas production from the shelves of the Black Sea and Azov Sea.

== Personal life ==
He is married to Lyudmila Ivanova, a teacher. They have two daughters: Albina, who was born in 1971 and is a doctor, and Natalia, who is also a teacher.

== Honours and awards ==
Chuprun has been awarded the following:

- Order of the Badge of Honour (1968)
- Order of the Red Banner of Labour (1973)
- Medal "For the love of the Fatherland" (by Turkmenistan)
- Order of Merit, III degree (1999)
- Honorary Diploma of the Cabinet of Ministers of Ukraine (2001)
- Order of Merit, II degree (2004)
