= 1995 Shakhtar Stadium explosion =

Shakhtar Stadium explosion
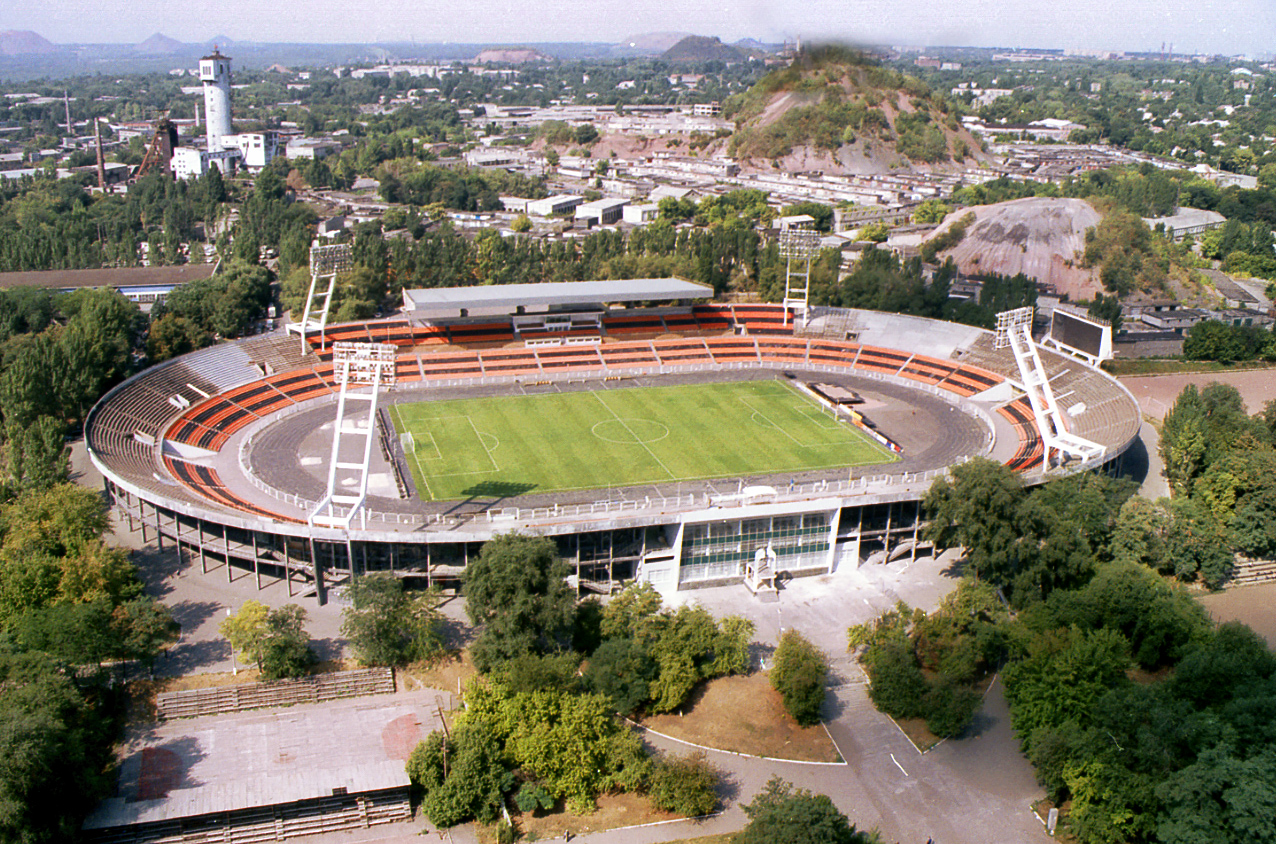
- Shakhtar Stadium in 1998.
- Location: 47°59′40.18″N 37°47′8.69″E; Shakhtar Stadium, Donetsk, Ukraine
- Date: 15 October 1995; 17:06
- Target: Assassination of Akhat Bragin
- Attack type: Explosion
- Weapon: Improvised explosive device
- Deaths: 6
- Injuries: 3
- Perpetrator: Criminal group of Yevhen Kushnir

The Shakhtar Stadium explosion was a terrorist attack that occurred on the evening of 15 October 1995, at Shakhtar Stadium in Donetsk. The explosion was intended to assassinate Akhat Bragin, the president of FC Shakhtar Donetsk and a crime boss; the investigation attributed the attack to the organized crime group of Yevhen Kushnir. During a Ukrainian Premier League match between Shakhtar and Tavriya Simferopol, an explosion occurred in the stadium's VIP box—an improvised explosive device, previously placed under a step in a service passageway, was detonated. The blast killed 6 people, including Bragin, and injured 3 others.

== Assassination attempts on Bragin ==
Before the fatal explosion at the Shakhtar stadium, at least two unsuccessful attempts on Akhat Bragin's life are known. In 1994 Bragin and his family were living in Pisky near Donetsk when, on 19 March, unknown persons opened fire on his house. Bragin himself was unharmed, having hidden in a dovecote. After the incident Bragin moved out of the residence, settled in the “Lux” hotel (where his main office was located), and reinforced his personal security.

Another attempt was planned for 8 May 1994: along the route used by Bragin's car in Donetsk, police discovered a truck carrying grenade launchers, with which Bragin's motorcade was to be ambushed.

== Course of events ==
Preparations to murder Akhat Bragin began around mid‑September. At the entrance to the VIP box, members of a criminal group – Andriy Akulov and Ihor Fylypenko – hollowed out a niche roughly 40×30×20 cm in the concrete base under one of the steps. An improvised explosive device – a plywood box measuring 10×20×10 cm containing about 5 kg of plastic explosive – was placed inside, triggered by a remote detonator. The opening was cemented over and disguised with a wooden cover on the step.

The organizers intended to carry out the attack during Shakhtar's match against Brugge in the 1995–96 UEFA Cup Winners' Cup, but for unknown reasons Bragin missed his team's European tie, although he normally attended every game. The terrorist act was postponed to the next match when Bragin would be present, even though the organizers feared the attempt might fail because the batteries of the detonator could become damp and lose their charge by then.

On 15 October, in a Ukrainian championship fixture, Shakhtar hosted Tavriya Simferopol. The match kicked off at 17:00, but only six minutes later (according to other sources, at 17:02 or 17:03) spectators and players heard an explosion and saw smoke in one of the stands. According to Hennadiy Orbu, the game was stopped a few minutes later when the crowd panicked and started running onto the pitch (players, referees and most fans probably mistook the blast for a firecracker set off by ultras). The players learned that the club president had been murdered only in the dressing room, from Shakhtar vice‑president Ravil Safiullin.

According to the investigation, Ihor Fylypenko, disguised in a police uniform, detonated the explosive while on the stadium tribune. Major of militsiya Viacheslav Synenko ensured the perpetrator's escape from the crime scene. The investigation named Vadym Bolotskykh as the organizer of the crime, although he himself named the leaders of the criminal group Kushnir and Riabin as the organizers, and insisted on his own non‑involvement. According to his testimony, ten members of Yevhen Kushnir's group were directly involved in the assassination attempt at the stadium; other gang members were stationed along Bragin's car route and relayed information about his movements.

The explosion in the VIP box caused the deaths of Akhat Bragin and five others close to him (including bodyguards); two more people from his entourage and a buffet worker, who was on the other side of the wall at the moment of the blast, were injured. The investigation noted that the assassination attempt was organized by professional explosives experts, as it was aimed precisely at Bragin, leaving him no chance of survival: only a severed hand with a Rolex watch and a cigarette lighter remained of Bragin.

== Investigation ==
Five days after the explosion, the newspaper Dzerkalo Tyzhnia, citing an unnamed people's deputy, published four versions of Bragin's liquidation that were being worked on by the investigation:

- Conflict with Chechen criminal groups that sought to establish control over Donetsk Oblast.
- Conflict with a Georgian group from Makiivka, with which Bragin's group was at war.
- Conflict with the Dnipropetrovsk Mafia, which aimed to expand its influence into Donetsk region.
- A murder by law enforcement agencies, which were powerless to bring Bragin to justice through legal means.

Yuriy Lutsenko, who served as Minister of Internal Affairs and Prosecutor General, indicated in an interview with the portal Lb.ua that law enforcement officers were indirectly involved. Bragin allegedly wanted to buy a Stinger missile to shoot down the plane carrying Yevhen Shcherban, so law enforcement hinted to the criminal world that there would be serious consequences if Bragin carried out his plan.

A criminal case was opened under Articles 17 (Liability for preparation of a crime and for attempted crime) and 93, subsections a, h, e (premeditated murder under aggravating circumstances) of the Criminal Code of Ukraine.

== Trial ==
Most members of Yevhen Kushnir's criminal group had disappeared or been killed in gangland conflicts by the end of 1998, specifically Andrii Akulov and Ihor Fylypenko died in 1998. Only two surviving participants were brought to trial: the organizer of the murder, Vadym Bolotskykh ("Moskvich"), and former police major Viacheslav Synenko.

In the early 2000s, Vadym Bolotskykh was detained; according to another version, he voluntarily surrendered to the General Prosecutor's Office of Ukraine, confessing to involvement in a number of high-profile murders, including the murders of Yevhen Shcherban and Akhat Bragin. At trial, Bolotskykh initially admitted that he had advised the perpetrators and was himself near the stadium to coordinate the attack, but later recanted his testimony, claiming he had incriminated himself under pressure. In 2003, Bolotskykh was sentenced to life imprisonment; he served his sentence in a colony in Luhansk Oblast. The investigation was unable to prove the contract nature of any of the murders, as Bolotskykh did not admit to receiving payment, explaining his actions as a desire to free the Ukrainian people from the influence of the rich.

Viacheslav Synenko retired in 1997 and later moved with his family to Greece, where he was detained in 2001 at the request of Ukraine to Interpol and extradited in 2005. In February 2007, Synenko was sentenced to life imprisonment and ordered to pay compensation of 50,000 hryvnias to each of two families of the victims, but the following year the case was referred by the Supreme Court to the Donetsk Oblast Court of Appeal, citing insufficient evidence for certain episodes. In 2009, Viacheslav Synenko was released and the case was sent for reinvestigation. On 14 December 2010, the General Prosecutor's Office completed the investigation into the murder of Bragin and transferred it for consideration to the Voroshylovskyi District Court of Donetsk.

During the trial, Synenko claimed that the case against him had been fabricated. He stated that the Donetsk police had cooperated with local criminals, which he had reported to journalist Ihor Aleksandrov. Because of his unwillingness to be involved in unlawful acts, Synenko was allegedly forced into retirement; after an attempt on his life in May 1998, he moved with his family to Athens, where he lived from 1999 to 2004.
