= Sievierodonetsk Congress =

The Sievierodonetsk Congress on November 28, 2004, was an all—Ukrainian congress of deputies of all levels during the socio-political crisis in the autumn of 2004 caused by the Orange Revolution in order to develop a common strategy for stabilizing the situation in the country. It was held at the Ice Palace of the city of Sievierodonetsk, Luhansk Oblast.

== Reasons for convocation ==
It was a response to the actions of the local authorities of some regions of Western Ukraine (Lviv, Volyn, Ternopil and Ivano-Frankivsk), as well as the City Council of Kyiv and the authorities of the Kyiv Oblast about disobeying President Viktor Yanukovych elected according to the initial results and declaring V. A. Yushchenko the victorious presidential candidate in the 2004 elections.

== Organization of the Congress ==
The organization of the Congress was preceded by a number of statements, decisions and resolutions in the regions of the South and East of Ukraine. On November 26, 2004, the regular session of the Luhansk Oblast Council decided by a majority vote to create an Autonomous Southeastern Ukrainian Autonomous Republic. On the same day, Luhansk deputies appealed to Russian president Vladimir Putin for support. The next day, on November 27, an extraordinary session of the Kharkiv Oblast Council decided to create executive committees of the regional and district councils of the Kharkiv Oblast and empower them with the powers of state authorities. The session elected the governor of the Oblast Evgeny Kushnarev as the chairman of the regional executive committee. Kharkiv Oblast has stopped transferring funds to the republican budget until the political situation in Kyiv stabilizes. It was decided to hold a general meeting of public and political forces protesting orange Kyiv in Severodonetsk, Luhansk Oblast. Decisive actions of the head of the Kharkiv Oblast Yevgeny Kushnarev played a decisive role in the organization of the Congress. The All-Ukrainian Congress of People's Deputies and deputies of Local councils of all levels, which brought together about 3.5 thousand delegates from 17 regions of Ukraine, took place on Sunday, November 28, 2004. Donetsk, Dnipropetrovsk, Zhytomyr, Zaporizhzhia, Kirovohrad, Luhansk, Mykolaiv, Odesa, Poltava, Sumy, Kharkiv, Kherson, Chernihiv regions, Crimean autonomy and the city of Sevastopol. According to the organizers, delegates from Cherkasy and Transcarpathian regions could not come to the Congress only for technical reasons.

== The course of events at the congress ==
One of the journalists who attended the Congress describes its first minutes as follows:

Because of the non-flying weather, the one whose name became the banner for those gathered could not make it to the beginning of the congress. Someone in the front rows shouted: "Yanukovych is the President of Ukraine!". The audience responded with a standing ovation and cheers. A young man from the Sumy region was the first to ascend to the podium. From the city council, I think. "A crowd of "Orangemens" blocked the city council building. They don't even miss an ambulance. They demand that we recognize the self-styled Messiah. After the refusal, we are called enemies of the people. We will not give up",- that was the young man's words. A metallurgist from Alchevsk took the stage. "Friends, I just arrived from Kyiv. Terrible things are happening there. They won't stop at anything at all. It seems to me that all freedoms are over. They want power, and we are a temporary obstacle for them. We need to do something." I remember one of the deputies who, paraphrasing the famous expression of Dzerzhinsky, said that the lack of criminal records of Yushchenko and his entourage was not their merit, but an indicator of the poor work of the Ministry of Internal Affairs. Representatives of the Crimean Autonomy said that they had chosen Yanukovych as president and would not allow someone in Kyiv to replay everything. "Residents of Crimea, three million Tatars, we all support Donbass as one person. There are no different nationalities, there are honest and dishonest people. We are honest, we are with Yanukovych, with the south-eastern region," said a representative of the Muslim community of Crimea. But it was just emotions so far… Everyone understood that Kushnarev and Kolesnikov would say the main words...

Among the major politicians and public figures at the Congress were Viktor Yanukovych, who was declared the winner in the presidential elections of Ukraine, Mayor of Moscow Yuri Luzhkov, who arrived on behalf of Russian president Vladimir Putin, the governor of Kharkiv Oblast Yevhen Kushnaryov, the chairman of the Donetsk Oblast Council Borys Kolesnikov, the chairman of the Luhansk Oblast Council Viktor Tikhonov, the governor of Donetsk Oblast Anatoliy Blyznyuk and others.

The chairman of the Donetsk Oblast Council Borys Kolesnikov, who spoke first and outlined the reasons for convening the Congress, set the tone for the work at the Congress:

An emergency situation has developed in Ukraine today. Following the opposition politicians, the Verkhovna Rada violated the Law and violated the Constitution of the country. The situation is getting out of control. Until the last moment, we hoped for a peaceful resolution of the conflict. But now it is clear that this has become impossible in principle. We are obliged to protect the interests of our voters. And if we are not allowed to protect our choice, we are ready to take extreme measures. In this case, we propose: "'to express distrust to all the highest state authorities who have violated the law. Create a new southeastern Ukrainian state in the form of a federal republic. Kharkiv will become the capital of the new state, thus the first capital of the independent Ukrainian republic will be restored."' In order to protect ourselves from illegal actions aimed at our fellow governors, in accordance with the Law of Ukraine on local self-government, we no longer delegate powers to regional administrations, but on its basis create regional executive committees. To the head of the Central Election Commission, Sergey Kivalov, we say thank you from Donbass and want to express our support. We know how he was pressured, and what his principled position cost him. Economic prosperity and stability of the new state will ensure its high industrial potential and membership in the CES. We also assure the world community that the new State entity will have the most democratic Constitution in the world.

According to eyewitnesses, after this speech, a dead silence hung in the hall, and then hall exploded with emotions.

It was noted that the most vivid and emotional speech at the Congress was the speech of the head of the Kharkiv region, E. P. Kushnarev, who came to the podium after Kolesnikov:

Dear Viktor Fedorovich! Dear friends! None of us has any doubt that a carefully planned and prepared, superbly financed anti-state coup was carried out in Ukraine during the week. According to the most modern technologies of fooling people, they tried to put the self-styled President on the throne by any means, including force. This is all not new. We know that it is not the fault of these hundreds of thousands of people who are standing there today, because charismatic churches, such as the church of Moon, bring millions of people to the square, and they obey one wave of the hand. People are not to blame, the terrible hand that controls these people is to blame. It didn't work out! Their plans, although they caught us by surprise, failed. The most important thing is that the power in Ukraine has not fallen, in any case, we still have a President acting under the Constitution, we have an absolutely full–fledged Prime Minister. We have half of Ukraine with our government! Today it is already obvious that the world will not recognize an impostor under any circumstances. And this is also our victory! And most importantly. We missed a big blow. We thought we were playing by fair rules, but we got up, we have already risen to our full height. We are together, and we are invincible! Therefore, the main conclusion from this difficult week is: in order to bring our victory to a legitimate result, in order to defend our choice, we must be together, we must be strong, we must be unshakable! We must say firmly and clearly: we did not vote for an independent, independent, democratic, prosperous Ukraine in '91 in order to tear it to pieces today. We are for a united Ukraine! We are for a democratic and prosperous Ukraine! But don't try our patience. We have a worthy response to any attack, up to the most extreme measures. And I want to remind the hotheads under the orange banners: from Kharkiv to Kyiv – 480 kilometers, and to the border with Russia – 40! We want to live in a state where everyone is protected. His rights, his culture, his language, his history, his traditions and his customs are protected. We understand that the East has a very serious difference from Galicia, we do not impose our way of life on Galicia, but we will never allow Galicia to teach us how to live! We must preserve the main spiritual core that unites us, our faith. We will not accept the lifestyle imposed on us, we will not accept other people's symbols, our symbol is Orthodoxy! What should we do? We must once again resolutely and firmly declare that we will never, under any circumstances, recognize a self-crowned President. Viktor Fedorovich will be the president, having gone through all the legal procedures! And we have enough patience to reach the end! Dear friends! We want to live in peace, work, create, create, but a terrible, orange threat is hanging over our country, over our future. Therefore, I once again urge everyone to be steadfast, stand tall and defend our choice. Get up, the country is huge, Get up for a mortal fight, With the nashist power of darkness, With the orange plague! God and the Truth are with us!

Speaking for Kushnarev, the governor of Donetsk region Anatoly Bliznyuk proposed the idea of holding a referendum on the creation of a Southeastern autonomous entity. The words of Moscow Mayor Yuri Luzhkov were also heard at the Congress:

Two polar forces are now operating in Ukraine. On the one hand, gross interference in the affairs of Ukraine, on the other — Russia, which fully respects the sovereignty of the country. As the mayor of Moscow, I am ready to take off my favorite cap to be like Viktor Yanukovych.

Other politicians, being more restrained in their assessments, also expressed themselves in general within the framework of the proposed ideas and directions of action. Viktor Yanukovych, who was present at the Congress, expressed himself quite restrained, which in many ways predetermined the failure of this event:

I will never betray you, I will always go along with you. And what you accept will be the law for me.... A little more and everything will collapse. Let's try to find a solution without resorting to drastic measures. If even one drop of blood is spilled, this flow cannot be stopped. The protection of laws and human rights is our goal. Please make the decision that will ensure the integrity of the country and order in the state…

== Decisions of the Congress ==
The main statement of the Congress was an ultimatum, according to which, in the event of the illegitimate, according to the participants of the Congress, President V. Yushchenko coming to power, he reserves the right to adequate actions aimed at protecting the rights of citizens of his regions, up to the creation of South-Eastern autonomy. It was decided to create an Interregional Council of Local Self-government bodies of Ukrainian regions. The place of work of this coordinating council, as well as the executive directorate, was determined by Kharkiv, which was supposed to be the capital of the South-Eastern Ukrainian Autonomous Republic. In Luhansk and Donetsk regions, it was decided to hold a referendum in the first half of December 2004 on the issue of acquiring the status of independent republics within the Ukrainian Federation. In addition, the Luhansk and Donetsk regional councils, following the Kharkiv one, announced the reassignment of the police and other state structures to themselves and the termination of transfers of money to the state budget.

== Results ==
Due to the indecision of the leadership of the Congress, which took a course to find a compromise with the orange political forces, the ideas of the Congress were not in demand and were not accepted by the highest political elite focused on Yanukovych. As a result, the strategic initiative put forward by the Congress was not implemented.
