= Anatoliy Blyznyuk =

Ukrainian politician

- Анатолій Близнюк
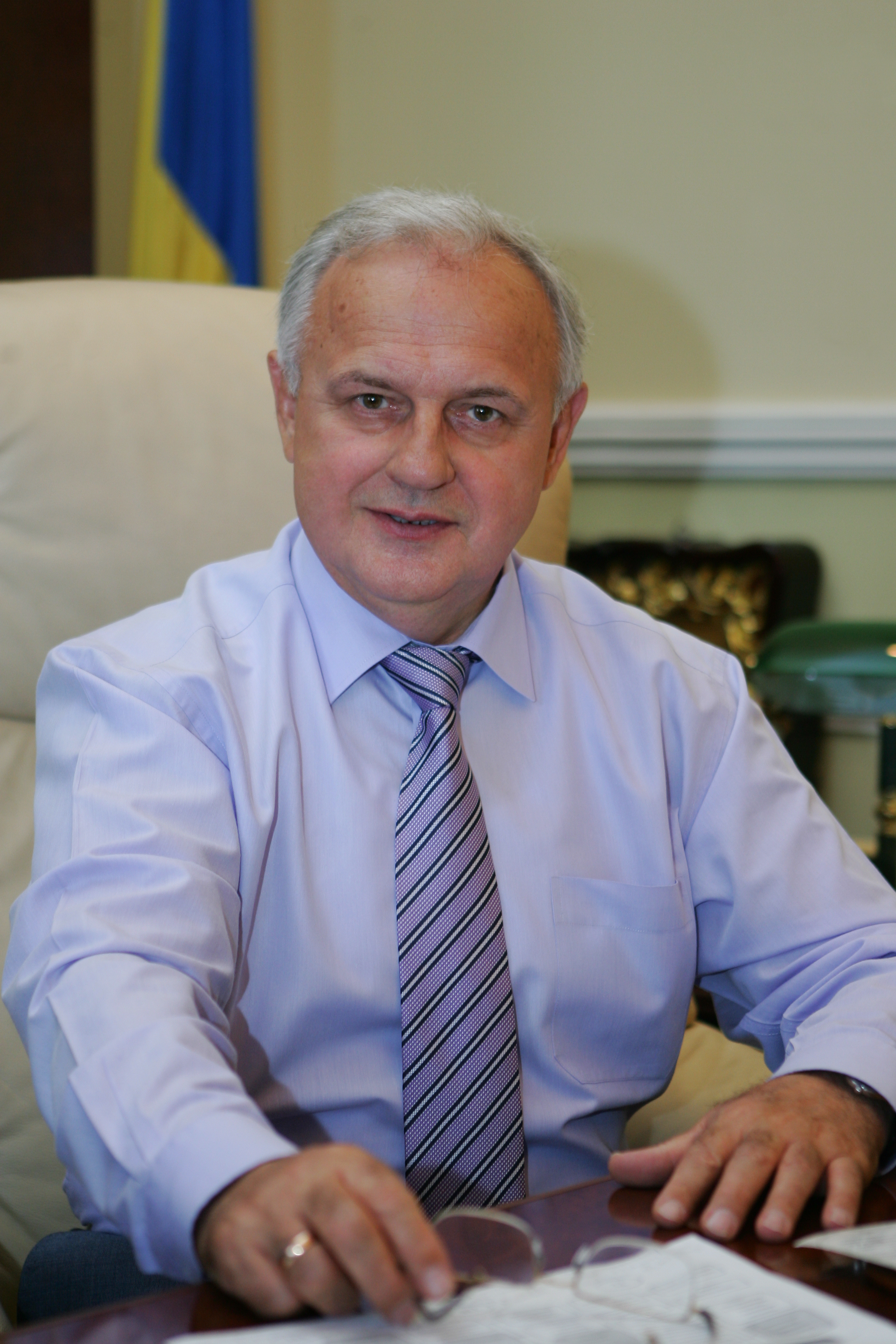
- Blyznyuk in July 2011

Member of the Verkhovna Rada
- In office 12 December 2012 – 27 November 2014

Minister of Regional Development, Construction, Housing and Communal Services
- In office 12 July 2011 – 3 December 2012
- Preceded by: Viktor Tykhonov
- Succeeded by: Hennadiy Temnyk

Governor of Donetsk Oblast
- In office 18 March 2010 – 12 July 2011
- Preceded by: Volodymyr Lohvynenko
- Succeeded by: Andriy Shyshatskiy
- In office 23 November 2002 – 21 January 2005
- Preceded by: Viktor Yanukovych
- Succeeded by: Vadym Chuprun

Head of the Donetsk Oblast Council
- In office 26 April 2006 – 15 April 2010
- Preceded by: Borys Kolesnikov
- Succeeded by: Andriy Shyshatskiy

Personal details
- Born: Anatoliy Mykhailovych Blyznyuk; 24 November 1948 (age 77) Kramatorsk, Ukrainian SSR, Soviet Union
- Party: Party of Regions

Anatoliy Mykhailovych Blyznyuk (Ukrainian: Анатолій Михайлович Близнюк; born on 24 November 1948) is a Ukrainian politician who last served as a member of the parliamentary faction of the Party of Regions in the Verkhovna Rada (the national parliament of Ukraine) of the 7th convocation (2012—2014).

Blyznyuk was also the Minister of Regional Development, Construction and Housing and Communal Services, serving from 2011 to 2012. Blyznyuk served as Governor of Donetsk Oblast twice, first from 2002 to 2005 and from 2010 to 2011.

He also served as the head of the Donetsk Oblast Council from 2006 to 2010.

== Biography ==
Anatoliy Blyznyuk was born on 24 November 1948 in Kramatorsk.

He began his career in July 1966 as an assistant turbine driver at the Kramatorsk Metallurgical Plant, based in Kuibyshev, Donetsk Oblast.

In June 1967, Blyznyuk served in the Soviet Army. He was on a special account in the department of the KGB of the Ukrainian SSR in the Donetsk Oblast. In January 1970, after serving in the border troops of the KGB of the army, he worked as a gasman, mastering gas facilities, as a senior foreman of the production section of the blast furnace shop.

In October 1981, he was promoted to the deputy chairman of the trade union committee of the Kramatorsk metallurgical plant named after Kuibyshev, Donetsk region.

In September 1984, he became the deputy director for commercial and financial issues of the Kramatorsk Metallurgical Plant.

He graduated from the Kramatorsk Industrial Institute in 1988 as a mechanical engineer.

From February 1988 to May 1990, he was promoted to the first deputy director of the Kramatorsk Metallurgical Plant.

From May 1990 to December 1990, he was the first deputy chairman of the Kramatorsk City Executive Committee.

From December 1990 to July 1994, he became the deputy chairman of the Kramatorsk City Executive Committee.

From May 1990 to July 1994, he worked as the first deputy chairman of the executive committee of the Kramatorsk city council, chairman of the board of OJSC Kramatorsk Metallurgical Plant named after Kuibyshev.

From August to November 1994, he was the director of procurement and metallurgical production of the Fistag-Viktoria joint venture, Kramatorsk.

From November 1994 to May 1996, he was the chairman of the board of the open joint-stock company Kramatorsk metallurgical plant named after Kuibyshev.

From May 1996 to June 1997, he was the first deputy chairman of the Kramatorsk City Council, Donetsk region.

From June to October 1997, he was the Deputy Head of the Donetsk Oblast State Administration.

Between October 1997 to November 2002, he was promoted to the first deputy head of the Donetsk Oblast state administration.

He graduated from the Donetsk State University of Economics and Trade in 2000. Master in Economics and Entrepreneurship.

In July 2002, he defended his dissertation for the degree of Candidate of Sciences in public administration.

On 23 November 2002, Blyznyuk became the Governor of Donetsk Oblast. On 12 May 2005, Blyznyuk was elected Deputy Chairman of the Donetsk Oblast Council. He left office as governor to take the oath for the transition of power and was succeeded by Vadym Churpun.

He was the chairman of the Standing Committee on Economic Policy, Budget, and Finance of the Donetsk Oblast Council.

On 26 March 2006, Blyznyuk was elected as a Deputy of the Donetsk Oblast Council as the 1st number of candidates for the Oblast Council from the Party of Regions. On 26 April, he was elected Chairman of the Donetsk Oblast Council.

He was the deputy chairman of the Donetsk Regional Branch of the Party of Regions.

During the 2007 Extraordinary Parliamentary Elections, he headed the regional election headquarters of the Party of Regions.

On 18 March 2010, by decree of the President of Ukraine, Viktor Yanukovych, Blyznyuk was appointed governor of Donetsk Oblast again.

On 12 July 2011, Blyznyuk was appointed Minister of Regional Development, Construction, Housing and Communal Services. Andriy Shyshatskiy was appointed in his place.

On 3 December 2012, Blyznyuk was dismissed as the Minister of Regional Development, Construction and Housing and Communal Services in connection with his election as a People's Deputy of Ukraine in the 2012 Ukrainian parliamentary election. He was elected into office as a member of the Verkhovna Rada (Ukraine's national parliament), a multi-member constituency, Party of Regions, number 15 on the list. He was a member of the Verkhovna Rada Committee on State Building and Local Self-Government.

He left the parliament on 27 November 2014.

== Family ==
He is married to his wife, Liliya Andriyvna, and raises two sons, Serhiy and Oleksiy. He likes to go out into nature with friends and his wife and cook barbecues. In music, he gives preference to the work of the singer Vladimir Vysotsky. In addition, Blyznyuk maintains his own blog.
