= Volodymyr Lohvynenko =

Ukrainian politician (born 1944)

- Володимир Логвиненко

Governor of Donetsk Oblast
- In office 16 May 2006 – 18 March 2010
- President: Viktor Yushchenko
- Preceded by: Serhiy Derhunov (acting)
- Succeeded by: Anatoliy Blyznyuk

Personal details
- Born: Volodymyr Ivanovych Lohvynenko; 14 October 1944 (age 82) Novopidhorodne (Synelnykove Raion), Ukrainian SSR, Soviet Union
- Other political affiliations: Communist Party of the Soviet Union
- Education: Prydniprovska State Academy of Civil Engineering and Architecture

Volodymyr Ivanovych Lohvynenko (Ukrainian: Володимир Логвиненко; born 14 October 1944) is a Ukrainian politician who served as Governor of Donetsk Oblast under President Viktor Yushchenko from 2006 to 2010.

== Early life ==
Lohvynenko was born on 14 October 1944 in the small village of Novopidhorodne, which was then part of the Ukrainian SSR in the Soviet Union. He is ethnically Ukrainian and is the son of Ivan and Maria Vasylivna. After graduating from secondary school, Lohvynenko immediately entered higher education, graduating from the Yasynuvata Construction College in Donetsk Oblast in 1964. He then worked initially as a plumber at "Santekhelectromontazh" in Kramatorsk for a few months, before transferring to work at "Krasnoarmeyskshakhtobud" in Pokrovsk. He steadily rose up the ranks there until 1974, becoming an engineer, then a senior engineer, and finally head of the training plant there. Upon leaving, he also graduated from the Prydniprovska State Academy of Civil Engineering and Architecture with the qualification of an engineer in industrial and civil construction.

Starting in 1974, he worked as an instructor for the Industrial and Transport Department of the Pokrovsk City Committee until 1977, when he briefly left to become the chief engineer again at Krasnoarmeyskshakhtobud. He only stayed there for a year until he became an instructor of the department of construction for the Donetsk Oblast Committee, which he did until 1984.

== Political career ==
In 1984, Lohvynenko was appointed Chairman of the Executive Committee of the Kramatorsk City Council. He stayed here for another four years, until he took on a variety of jobs between 1988 and 1994, becoming first deputy head of the main planning department of the Donetsk Oblast Executive Committee, first deputy chairman of the Donetsk Oblast Executive Committee, and first deputy head of the Donetsk Oblast Executive Committee. In 1994, he attempted to run for the post of Chairman of the Donetsk Oblast Council, but was decisively defeated by then deputy mayor of Donetsk Volodymyr Shcherban. After this, he briefly returned to politics, becoming deputy chairman of the executive committee for executive work of the council. However, he then left politics entirely, allegedly due to his loss in 1994, becoming general director of the company "Energo", which was owned by ex-director Viktor Nusenkis and deputy Hennadiy Vasilyev.

During his tenure at Energo, he led the company in becoming an investor in the Krasnoarmeiskaya-Zapadnaya No. 1 mine (within Pokrovsk) and unsuccessfully attempted to invest in the Makiivka Metallurgical Plant and Komsomolsk Mining Administration also. He eventually left the enterprise in 2002 after allegedly cutting ties and became Deputy Head of the Industry, Energy, Transport, and Communications Department of the Donetsk Oblast State Administration until 2005. In January 2005, following the events of the Orange Revolution, then governor Anatoliy Blyznyuk wrote a letter of resignation. Lohvynenko then briefly became the acting Governor of Donetsk Oblast, before he was dismissed in favour of Vadim Chuprun.

After his dismissal, Lohvynenko left politics again and became a senior lecturer at the Donbas National Academy of Civil Engineering and Architecture in Makiivka. He returned to politics on 16 May 2006 when he was appointed by President Viktor Yushchenko as Governor of Donetsk Oblast. His candidacy was supported by both the Party of Regions and Our Ukraine, and he was considered a compromise candidate by some, although deputy Yurii Kliuchkovskyi denied this. In 2007, he said that he supported the 2007 Ukrainian parliamentary election taking place, and that he opposed a boycott of it. He was dismissed on 18 March 2010 after Viktor Yanukovych became president.

== Personal life ==
He is married to Tamara Alexandrovna, a housewife. Together, they have two children: Marina, born in 1974, who is a doctor, and Oleksandr, an economist. He also received a PhD in economics during this time in 2005.

== Honours and awards ==
Lohvynenko has been awarded the following honours:

- State Prize of Ukraine in Science and Technology (2003, citation was specifically for "development of an active investment policy to ensure the highest productivity of coal mining")
- Honorary Diploma of the Cabinet of Ministers of Ukraine (2004)
- Honored Industry Worker of Ukraine (2004)
- Order of Merit, III degree (2008)
