= South-East Ukrainian Autonomous Republic =

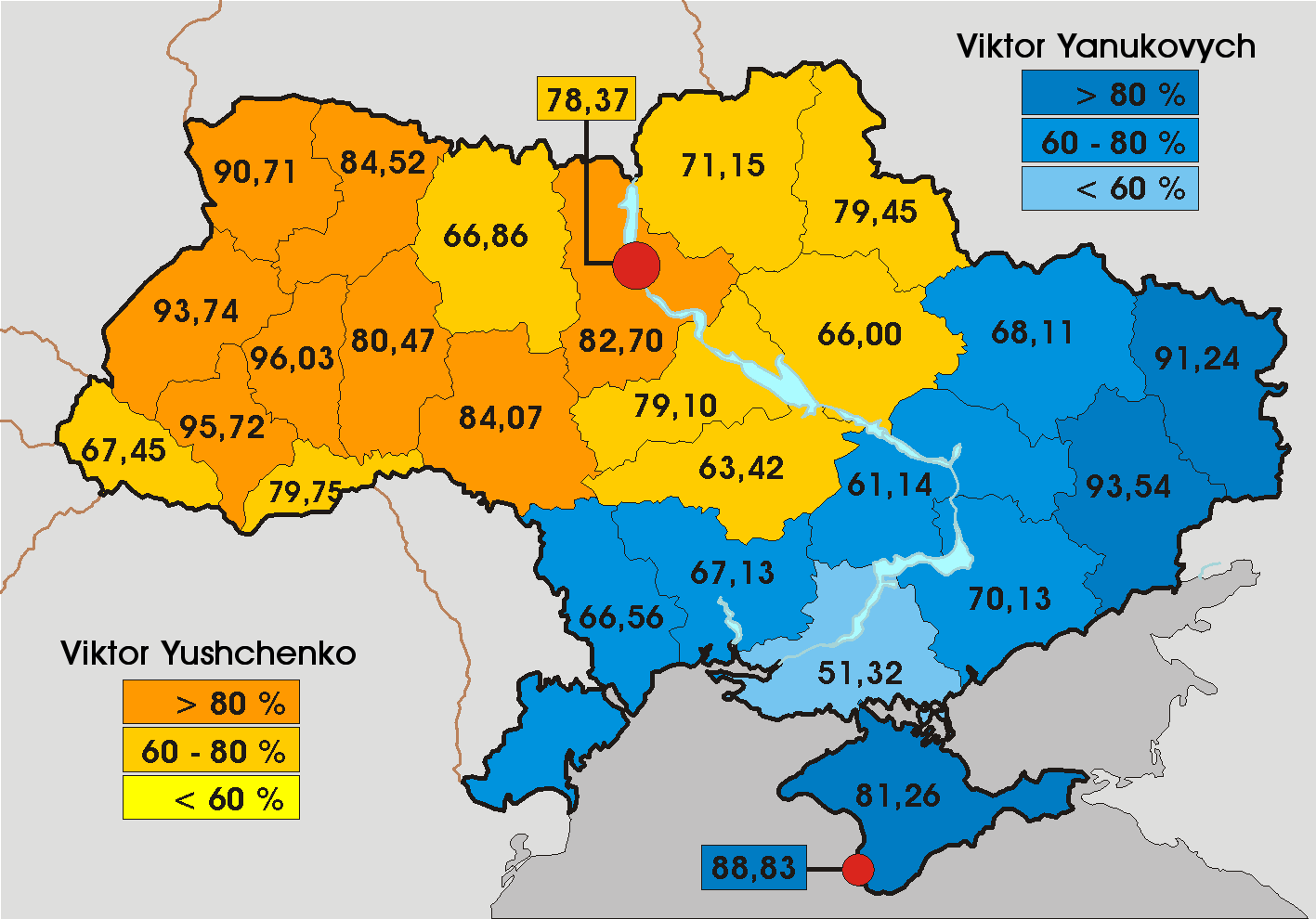
Results of the second round of presidential elections in Ukraine in 2004. Regions in which the majority of the votes scored Viktor Yanukovych (marked in blue), the initiators of the project was supposed to combine as part of South-East Ukrainian Autonomous Republic (PSUAR).

South-East Ukrainian Autonomous Republic (Ukrainian: Південно-Східна Українська Автономна Республіка, ПСУАР, romanized: Pivdenno-Skhidna Ukrayinska Avtonomna Respublika, PSUAR) was a Ukrainian political project of pro-Viktor Yanukovych politicians and officials in 2004. Initiated on 26 November 2004 by the Luhansk Oblast Council, the project was discontinued the next month by the Donetsk Oblast Council. The republic was intended to consist of nine regions of Ukraine.

The idea on creating of the political entity arose at a session of the Luhansk Oblast Council chaired by Viktor Tikhonov and attended by Oleksandr Yefremov. The session adopted a decision to discontinue subordination to the Luhansk State Regional Administration and create a separate executive committee headed by Oleksandr Yefremov. The session also included for revision by the congress of bodies of local self-government and executive power in Southeastern territories of Ukraine a proposition in organization of working group in creation of tax, payment, banking and finance institutions of the Southeastern territories.

Donetsk Mayor Oleksandr Lukyanchenko, however, stated that no one wanted autonomy, but rather sought to stop Orange Revolution demonstrations going on at the time in Kyiv and negotiate a compromise.

== See also ==
- 2004 Ukrainian presidential election
- Sievierodonetsk Congress
- Novorossiya (confederation)
- Novorossiya
- Luhansk People's Republic
- Donetsk People's Republic
- Regionalism in Ukraine
