= Yevhen Shcherban =

Ukrainian businessman and politician (1946–1996)

- Євген Щербань
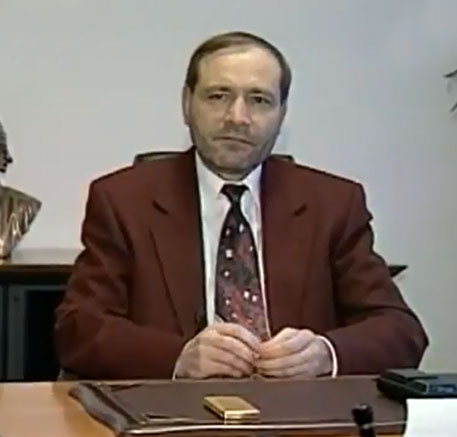

People's Deputy of Ukraine
- In office 27 March 1994 – 3 November 1996
- Constituency: Volnovakha Raion

Personal details
- Born: Yevhen Oleksandrovych Shcherban; 18 January 1946 Kostiantynivka, Kharkiv Oblast, Ukrainian SSR, Soviet Union
- Died: 3 November 1996 (aged 50) Donetsk Airport, Ukraine
- Cause of death: Assassination by gunshot
- Citizenship: Soviet Union, Ukraine
- Party: Liberal Party of Ukraine
- Spouse: Nadia Nikitina
- Children: 3 sons
- Education: Donetsk National Technical University
- Occupation: businessman, politician

Yevhen Oleksandrovych Shcherban (Ukrainian: Євген Олександрович Щербань, 18 January 1946 – 3 November 1996) was a Ukrainian businessman and politician. As a member of the Liberal Party of Ukraine, he was elected to the Verkhovna Rada from the Volnovakha electoral district in Donetsk Oblast. He served as the People's Deputy of Ukraine from 1994 until his assassination in 1996.

== Biography ==
Yevhen Oleksandrovych Shcherban was born in the village of Kostyantynivka, Krasnokutsk Raion on 18 January 1948. From 1972-77 he studied at the Mining Industrial College in Donetsk, and later at Donetsk National Technical University. Until 1988 he worked as a mining engineer. After the independence of Ukraine he established a cooperative organization "Progress" and later a corporation "ATON".

In the mid-1990s, Shcherban was among the richest people in Ukraine and a prominent and influential member of parliament for the Liberal Party of Ukraine.

== Death ==
Shcherban and his wife Nadezhda (née Nikitina) were shot dead in the ramp of Donetsk Airport on 3 November 1996 by several men posing as public force officers.

=== Trial ===
Among the killers were Vadim Bolotskikh, Gennadiy Zangelidi and other members of the so-called "Kushnir Gang." Bolotskikh, a Russian national from Siberia, killed Shcherban and his wife but was reportedly injured in the shoulder, while Zangelidi, now deceased, killed two airport employees.

Prosecutors have stated the murder was intended to eliminate competition for control of the natural gas industry. In 2002, eight men, including Bolotskikh, were arrested and tried for the murder. All of them were found guilty, with three receiving life sentences.

=== Related events ===
Before the Shcherban killing, a number of assassinations of lesser ISD members took place from January to July 1996. However, the assassination of Shcherban became the most noticeable, because he was a People's Deputy of Ukraine. Coincidentally, the event took place soon after the replacement of the Governor of Donetsk Oblast Volodymyr Shcherban (no relation to Yevhen) with the former Minister of Coal Industry of Ukraine Serhiy Polyakov and the appointment of Viktor Yanukovych to the position of a deputy chairman.

Previously, in December 1995, when Serhiy Polyakov was appointed to the ministerial position in Donetsk, the Industrial Union of Donbas (ISD) was established. Nominally headed by Serhiy Taruta, many saw the real leader of the Union as Yevhen Shcherban.

Preceding that, in October 1995, Akhat Bragin was assassinated, allegedly by Kushnir’s gang, one of whose members was later accused of killing Vadym Hetman, the Chairman of National Bank of Ukraine in April 1998. The gang's founder and leader, Yevhen Kushnir, died in April 1998 after an alleged allergic reaction to medicines given to him in a prison hospital after being wounded weeks before.

== Shcherban Affair ==
Former Ukrainian Prime Minister Pavlo Lazarenko was implicated in Shcherban's murder by the Prosecutor General of Ukraine Svyatoslav Piskun in January 2003. Piskun was fired from the office of Prosecutor General by two presidents of Ukraine, Leonid Kuchma and Viktor Yushchenko, but both dismissals were voided by the courts. Since late October 2011 former Prime Minister Yulia Tymoshenko has also been implicated, particularly by the First Deputy Prosecutor General of Ukraine Renat Kuzmin. In late October 2011 Ukrainian prosecutors began investigating whether Tymoshenko and Lazarenko were involved in Shcherban's murder. On 4 April 2012 Shcherban’s son, Ruslan, gave a press conference in Kyiv in which he implied he had new evidence in the case. The wife of a key witness in the case, Izabella Kyrychenko who is a citizen of the United States, had complained that she was imprisoned to force a statement from her husband. Arrested in late 2011, she was released after three months from detention in the Lukyanivska Prison on health grounds. Coincidentally, her husband, Petro Kyrychenko was at the time giving testimony in connection with the Shcherban murder. In 2012, the Pechersk District Court closed the case against Kyrychenko.

On 18 January 2013, Tymoshenko was notified that she was a suspect for the murders of Shcherban, his wife and two other people in 1996.

In 2020, Ruslan Shcherban took back the accusations he had made against Tymoshenko: “As an affected party I had the right to suspect anyone. I had to check it. I know today that Pavlo Lazarenko was the actual assassin's paymaster, and Yulia Tymoshenko had nothing to do with it.”

== See also ==
- Cassette Scandal
- List of members of the Verkhovna Rada of Ukraine who died in office
