= Volodymyr Shcherban =

Ukrainian politician (born 1950)

- Володимир Щербань
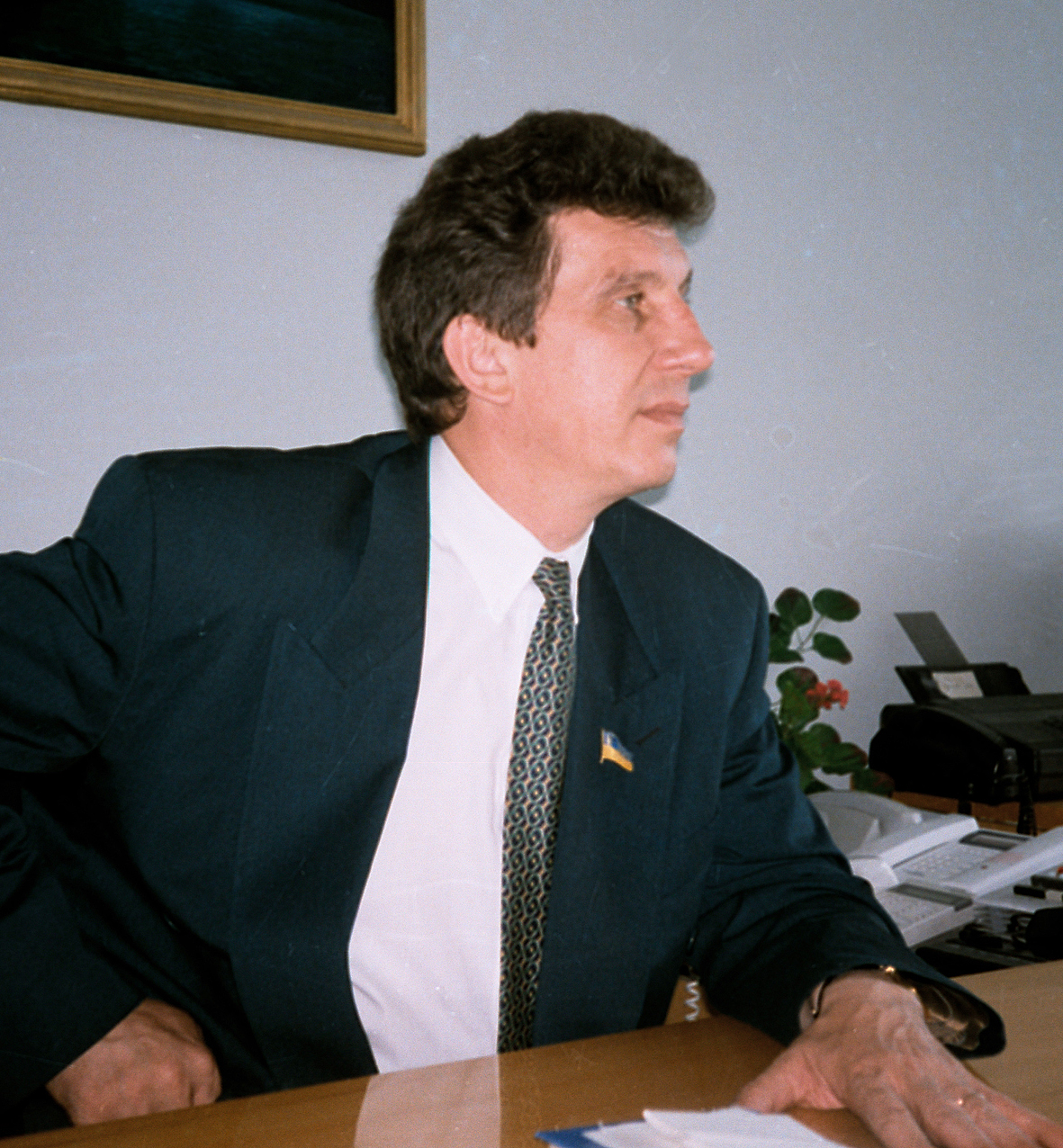

Governor of Sumy Oblast
- In office 15 November 2002 – 21 January 2005
- President: Leonid Kuchma
- Preceded by: Yuriy Zharkov
- Succeeded by: Mykola Lavryk
- In office 30 March 1999 – 25 April 2002
- Preceded by: Mark Berfman
- Succeeded by: Yuriy Zharkov

Governor of Donetsk Oblast
- In office 11 July 1995 – 18 July 1996
- President: Leonid Kuchma
- Preceded by: Yuriy Smyrnov
- Succeeded by: Serhiy Polyakov

Chairman of Donetsk Oblast Council
- In office 10 July 1994 – 4 October 1996
- President: Leonid Kuchma
- Preceded by: Vadym Chuprun
- Succeeded by: Ivan Ponomaryov

Personal details
- Born: 26 January 1950 (age 76) Artemivsk, Ukrainian SSR, Soviet Union
- Party: Liberal Party of Ukraine; Our Ukraine
- Spouse: Iryna
- Children: Artem Volodymyrovych Shcherban
- Education: Donetsk Institute of Soviet Trade

Volodymyr Petrovych Shcherban (Ukrainian: Володимир Петрович Щербань; born 26 January 1950) is a Ukrainian politician and governor of a number of regions in Ukraine.

== Brief biography ==
Shcherban was born in the town of Artemivsk, Perevalsk Raion (Voroshilovhrad Oblast) on 26 January 1950. After finishing school, in 1967 he went to work for the Tochmash Factory in Donetsk as apprentice to a locksmith. From 1969 to 1971 Shcherban served in the army. Afterwards, he returned to Tochmash where he worked as a locksmith from 1971 to 1972. From 1972 to 1976 Shcherban studied at the Donetsk Institute of Soviet Trade. From 1976 to 1979 he worked for the fruit and vegetable farms of the Chernivtsi regional department of retail. Later he worked in a number of retail institutions in Donetsk.

In 1990 Shcherban was elected to the Donetsk City Council. From 1992 to 1994 he was a deputy mayor in Donetsk and from 1994 to 1996 chairman of the Donetsk Oblast council. Shcherban was also elected to the Verkhovna Rada from the Budyonnivsky electoral district N107 (Donetsk Oblast). In the parliament he was a member of the Social-Market Choice faction and the Budget Committee. He served as a People's Deputy of Ukraine at the second convocation until 1998. At the same time, from 1995 to 1996, Shcherban was appointed the governor of Donetsk Oblast and was an acting governor of Sumy Oblast from 1994 to 1996, completely ignoring the fact of unlawful conduct by working as legislator and government official.

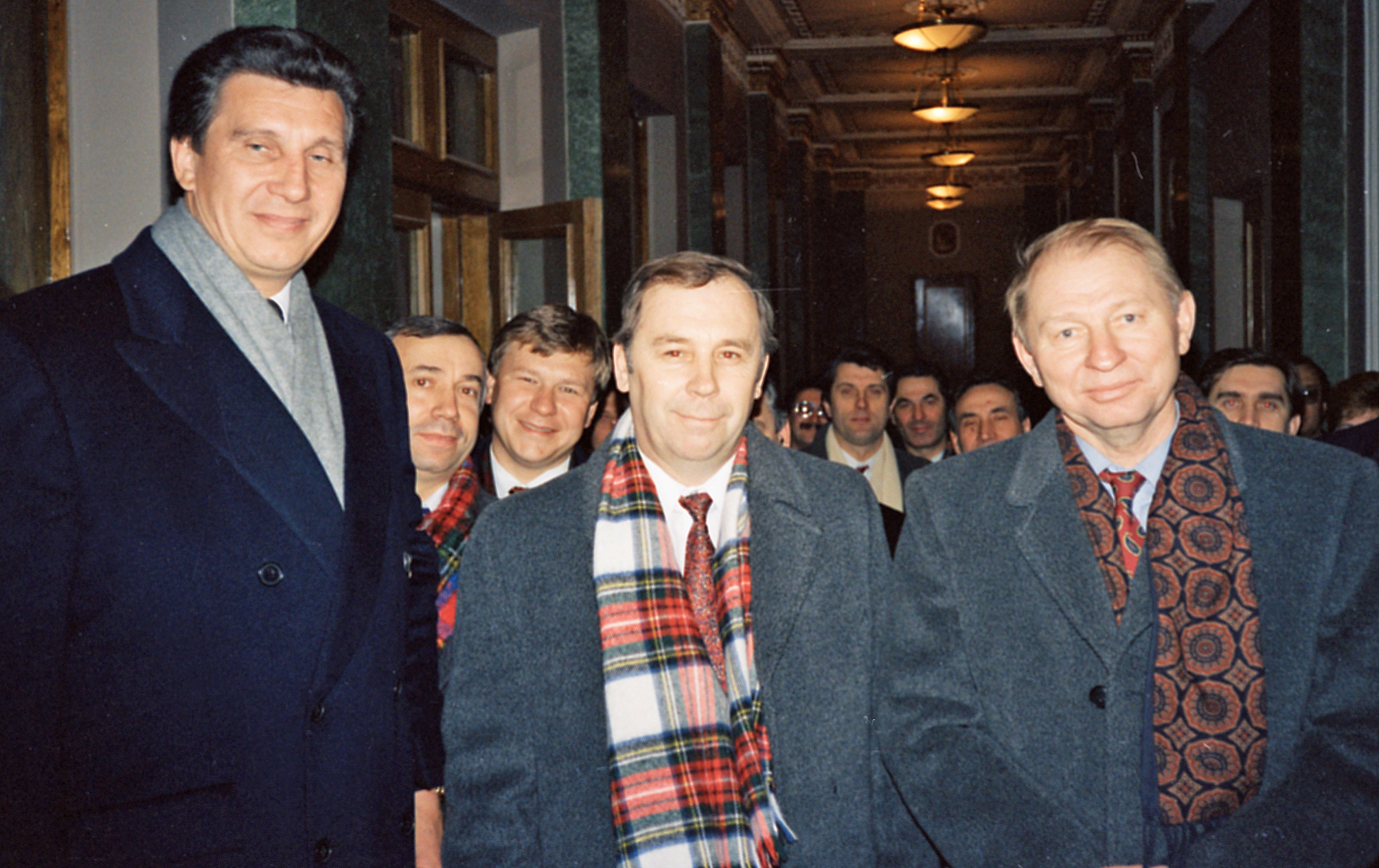
Scherban (left), with Volodmyr Rybak, Leonid Kuchma and Viktor Yuschenko in Dontesk

As a member of the Liberal Party of Ukraine (LPU), Shcherban was elected once again from the Donetsk region electoral district N41 in 1998, joining the parliamentary group the Independents. On July 8, 1999, the decision of the Constitutional Court of Ukraine came into force which prohibited Volodymyr Shcherban from combining the post of the head of the Sumy Regional State Administration with the duties of a people's deputy of Ukraine. In connection with this decision, Vladimir Shcherban had to submit an application for withdrawal from the deputy corps. In September 1999 Shcherban finally resigned as a member of parliament.

On March 30, 1999, he was appointed the governor of Sumy Oblast State Administration, a position which he held until 2002. He began appointing new people, who were mainly from Donetsk, which led to a conflict with the chairman of the regional council Anatoly Alexandrovich Epifanov (born 12 August 1945, Korovyntsi, Nedryhailiv Raion, Sumy Oblast, Ukrainian SSR), who had ruled the Sumy Oblast for the last eight years, and resulted in Epifanov submitting his resignation on June 23, 1999. At the end of 2000 while he was governor of Sumy Oblast, Shcherban traveled in the state delegation headed by the President of Ukraine Leonid Kuchma to both Turkmenistan and Uzbekistan. During this state sponsored trip, he concluded an agreement on the supply of equipment to Turkmenistan. Later, in early November 2000, he attended a meeting of the governors of the Sumy region and the Turkish province of Muğla, which resulted a treaty of friendship and cooperation. In 2001, he signed an agreement between the governors of the Sumy and Murmansk regions, which supported the Sumy-based enterprise Sumykhimprom.

In 2002, he again was elected to the parliament as a member of the LPU within the electoral bloc Our Ukraine N44 on a party list. Soon after being elected, Shcherban joined the For United Ukraine parliamentary faction for a short time (the faction was dissolved) and then People's Choice. In June 2003 he resigned as a member of parliament, being appointed the governor of Sumy Oblast one more time.

The United States State Department issued a report on human rights violations in Ukraine during the presidency of Leonid Kuchma in which implicated Shcherban of human rights violations during a crackdown on student protests in August 2004.

After the Orange Revolution in the beginning of 2005, Volodymyr Shcherban fled from Ukraine through Switzerland to the United States and ended up in Orlando and later Boca Raton, both in Florida. In Ukraine, he was charged with a number of serious crimes such as abuse of an official post, abuse of power, extortion, fraud of financial resources, hindering the exercise of electoral rights, and others. Shcherban, however, was detained in October 2005 on expired visa charges and placed in an immigration prison near Miami, but was released on $2 million bail. (Note: Since July 2005, Shcherban and his wife Iryna had resided on north Orange Avenue at his downtown Orlando apartment in the upscale Echelon at Uptown complex. He was arrested at his Orlando apartment, charged with immigration violations for overstaying his visa, and spent Wednesday, October 12, 2005, at the Orange County Jail. Then, he was detained without bail at the Krome Detention Center near Miami beginning on Thursday, October 13, 2005, and, later, after his deportation hearing, he was deported back to Ukraine. Arriving in Miami at the Miami International Airport on April 9, 2005, Shcherban's B-2 visa was valid for six months and had expired on Saturday, October 8, 2005.)

While illegally visiting Florida in February 2006, Shcherban was caught up in controversy by attending a $500-a-plate fundraiser on February 3, 2006, for gubernatorial candidate Charlie Crist hosted by Donald Trump at Trump's Mar-A-Lago resort in West Palm Beach, which constituted an illegal campaign contribution. At the request of Ukrainian authorities who had issued an arrest warrant for Shcherban in May 2005 on charges of threats, extortion, intimidation and exceeding government authority in connection with the November 2004 elections in Ukraine which led to the Orange Revolution, he was extradited back to Ukraine. In November 2006, representatives of the General Prosecutor Office of Ukraine detained Shcherban at Boryspil International Airport, but after a few days he was allowed to go home.

== Family ==
- Wife – Iryna, chairman of the Vichnist (Eternity) charity fund in Sumy Oblast.
- Son – Artem, member of parliament (Party of Regions), owner of the Gefest network of gas stations that once belonged to Yevhen Shcherban

== 1996 murder case ==
Both Shcherbans were business and political partners in the past. However, Serhiy Vlasenko notes that in the fall of 1996 there was a conflict between the two of them as Yevhen Shcherban reconsidered his political plans and intended to align himself with Yevhen Marchuk to pursue further political goals. Vlasenko also stated that two days after the murder, there was a funds transfer of over $2 million from the accounts of the American company belonging to Nadia Nikitina (wife of Yevhen Shcherban) to the accounts of the American company belonging to Artem Shcherban (son of Volodymyr Shcherban). Soon thereafter, member of parliament Vlasenko was stripped of his legislative mandate by the Higher Administrative Court of Ukraine (VASU).

In an interview with journalist Yevhen Yevhenovych Shcherban (junior) of Mirror Weekly on September 22, 1997, soon after surviving another murder attempt, he stated that neither the former (Volodymyr Shcherban) or current governors (Viktor Yanukovych) of Donetsk Oblast, nor the mayor of Donetsk (Volodymyr Rybak) helped him and his brother after the murder of their father.

== Bread factories ==
At the end of 2011, Shcherban sold his bread factory in Lebedyn to local entrepreneur Oleksandr Marchenko. In addition, Shcherban also listed his factories in Okhtyrka and Hlukhiv (note: all in the Sumy Oblast) for sale. He also sold just over half of the controlling stock in another bread factory in Konotop to Party of Regions politician Vitaliy Khomutynnik in 2008.
