= Ahat Jami Mosque =

Mosque in Donetsk, Ukraine

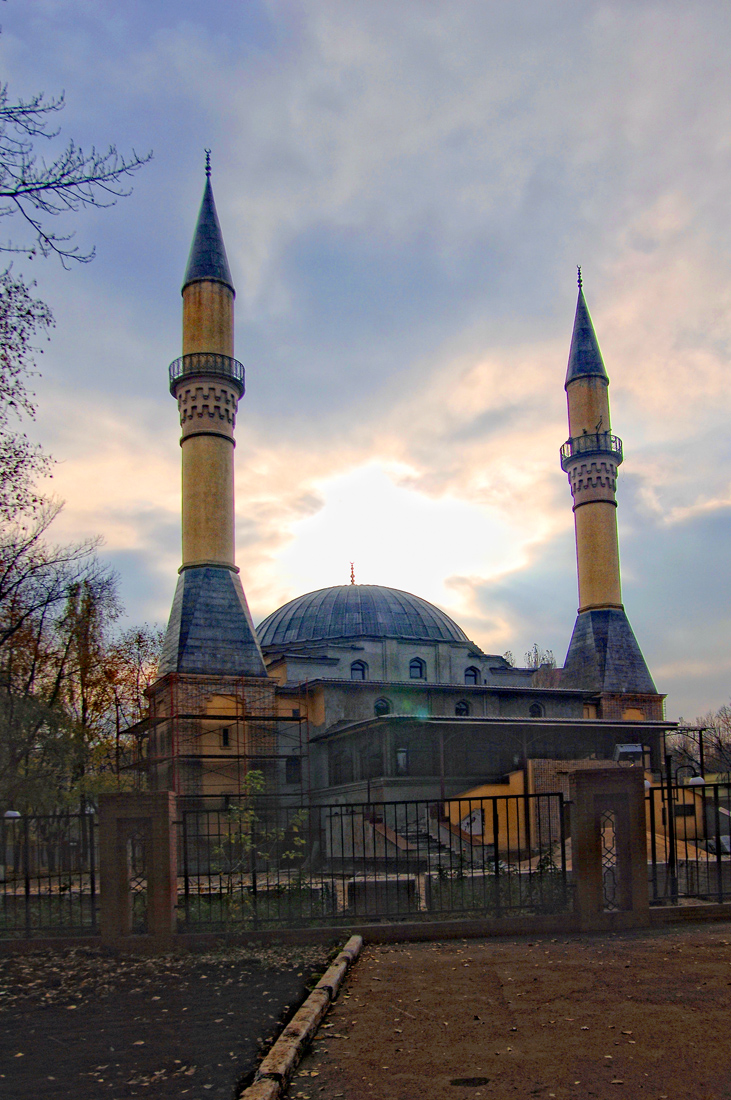

Religion
- Affiliation: Islam
- District: Donetsk Oblast
- Status: Active

Location
- Location: Donetsk
- Interactive map of Ahat Jami Mosque
- Territory: Ukraine (de jure); Donetsk People's Republic (de facto)
- Coordinates: 48°03′11.5″N 37°43′11″E

Architecture
- Type: Mosque
- Completed: September 3, 1999

Specifications
- Capacity: 700
- Dome: 1
- Minaret: 2

The Ahat Jami Mosque (Ukrainian: Мечеть Ахать Джамі, romanized: Mechet Akhat Dzhami; Russian: Ахать-Джами, lit. 'Akhat-Dzhami'; Tatar: Әхәт Җәми мәчете, romanized: Äxät Cemi mäçete) is a jama masjid (congregational mosque) located in Donetsk, Ukraine. The mosque was named in honor of local mafia boss Akhat Bragin and one of its minarets is named after Rinat Akhmetov. It is the first mosque to be built in Donets basin since the fall of the Soviet Union. Although de jure located in Ukraine, the mosque is on territory currently controlled by Russia as part of the Donetsk People's Republic.

== History ==
In 1993 in the Donetsk Muslim community established Star of the Prophet. One year later, the foundation was laid for the region's first mosque, Ibn Fadlan. The plans for the project were taken from one of Istanbul's mosques.

The main sponsor for the building was Akhat Bragin. After his death on October 15, 1995, the mosque was named in his honor. Initially the project called for the construction of one minaret but financing from Rinat Akhmetov made it possible to build two. The second was named in honor of him. On the first floor of the mosque is located Ukrainian Islamic University -the first Muslim institution of higher education in Ukraine.

The official opening of the Ahat Cami mosque and Ukrainian Islamic University was held on September 3, 1999.

In 2014, during the War in the Donbas, an artillery shell struck the dome of the mosque, causing significant visible damage to the dome structure. The mufti stated that due to the damage the entire dome would have to be replaced since it was only cast in one piece. It was again struck by shelling in June 2019, to which both the DPR and Ukraine accused each other of doing. Due to this, the UN Human Rights Monitoring Mission requested security guarantees near the mosque. It was last hit by shelling in October 2022 during renewed fighting. In April 2024, Russian state media reported that the Akhmat Kadyrov Foundation expressed its intention to restore the mosque once conditions would allow it to be safely repaired.

== See also ==
- Islam in Ukraine
