= Governor of Donetsk Oblast =

Chief executive of Donetsk Oblast, Ukraine

- Донецька обласна державна адміністрація
- Seal of Donetsk Oblast

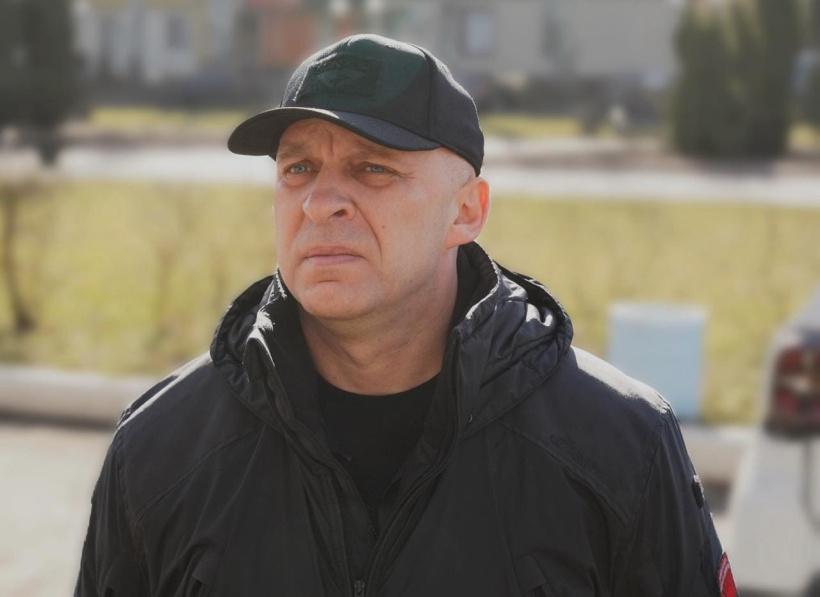
- Incumbent; Vadym Filashkin since 28 December 2023
- Residence: Donetsk (de jure); Kramatorsk (de facto)
- Term length: Four years
- Inaugural holder: Mykhailo Nalimov; 1932
- Formation: 1932 as Chairman of Executive Committee of Donetsk Oblast
- Website: Government of Donetsk Oblast

The governor of Donetsk Oblast is the head of executive branch for the Donetsk Oblast. Due to the current Russo-Ukrainian War Donetsk Oblast is, since 5 March 2015, assigned as a civil–military administration. Hence the governor of Donetsk Oblast is officially called Head of the Donetsk Regional Military Civil Administration.

The office of governor is an appointed position, with officeholders being appointed by the President of Ukraine, on recommendation from the Prime Minister of Ukraine, to serve a four-year term.

The official residence for the governor is located in Donetsk, but was relocated to Kramatorsk in 2014 due to the war in Donbas.

== Governors ==
=== Chairman of Executive Committee of Donetsk Oblast ===
Governors of united region before its split into Stalino and Voroshylovhrad oblasts

- Mykhailo Nalimov (1932)
- Mykhailo Chuvyrin (1932–1933)
- Mykola Ivanov (1933–1937)
- Volodymyr Vsevolozhsky (1937)
- Petro Schpilyovy (1937–1939)

=== Chairman of Executive Committee of Donetsk (Stalino) Oblast ===
- Anton Gayovy (1939–1940)
- Pylyp Reshetnyak (1940–1941)
- Nazi German occupation (1941–1943)
- Pylyp Reshetnyak (1943–1944)
- Oleksandr Struyev (1944–1947)
- M. Malyshev (1947) (acting)
- Mykola Alyshev (1957–1949)
- Mark Spivak (1949–1950)
- Viktor Kremenytsky (1950–1954)
- Danylo Adamets (1954–1956)
- Mykola Blyaton (Blagun) (1956–1959)
- Dmytro Grydasov (1959–1982) (Note: For Industry 1963 – 1964)
- Viktor Pokhodin (1963–1964) (Note: For Agriculture)
- Vasyl Myronov (1982)
- Anatoliy Statinov (1982–1987)
- Viktor Kucherenko (1987–1989)
- Yuriy Smyrnov (1989–1990)
- Volodymyr Sheludchenko (1990)
- Yuriy Smyrnov (1990–1992)

=== Representative of the President ===
- Yuriy Smyrnov (1992–1994)

=== Chairman of the Executive Committee ===
- Volodymyr Shcherban (1994–1995)

=== Heads of the Administration ===
- Volodymyr Shcherban (1995–1996)
- Serhii Polyakov (1996–1997)
- Viktor Yanukovych (1997–2002)
- Anatoliy Blyznyuk (2002–2005)
- Volodymyr Lohvynenko (2005) (acting)
- Vadym Chuprun (2005–2006)
- Serhiy Derhunov (2006) (acting)
- Volodymyr Lohvynenko (2006–2010)
- Anatoliy Blyznyuk (2010–2011)
- Andriy Shyshatskiy (2011–2014)
- Serhiy Taruta (2014)
- Oleksandr Kikhtenko (2014–2015)

==== Head of the Donetsk Regional Military Civil Administration ====
- Pavlo Zhebrivskyi (2015–2018)
- Oleksandr Kuts (2018–2019)
- Pavlo Kyrylenko (2019–2023)
- Ihor Moroz (2023) (acting)
- Vadym Filashkin (2023–incumbent)

== See also ==
- Donetsk Regional Committee of the Communist Party of Ukraine
