= Andriy Shyshatskiy =

Ukrainian politician (born 1981)

- Андрій Шишацький
- Shyshatskiy in 2011.

Governor of Donetsk Oblast
- In office 12 July 2011 – 2 March 2014
- President: Viktor Yanukovych; Oleksandr Turchynov (acting)
- Preceded by: Anatoliy Blyznyuk
- Succeeded by: Serhiy Taruta

Chairman of the Donetsk Oblast Council
- In office 15 April 2010 – 12 July 2011
- Preceded by: Anatoliy Blyznyuk
- Succeeded by: Andriy Fedoruk
- In office 3 March 2014 – 9 April 2014
- Preceded by: Andriy Fedoruk
- Succeeded by: vacant

Personal details
- Born: Andriy Volodymyrovych Shyshatskiy; 12 October 1965 (age 60) Sloviansk, Ukrainian SSR, Soviet Union (now Ukraine)
- Party: Party of Regions
- Education: Donetsk National University; International Institute of Management

Andriy Volodymyrovych Shyshatskiy (Ukrainian: Андрій Шишацький; born 12 October 1965) is a Ukrainian politician and businessman who served as Governor of Donetsk Oblast from 2011 to 2014 under President Viktor Yanukovych. During his tenure, he was the governer during the early stages of the 2014 pro-Russian unrest in Ukraine in the aftermath of Euromaidan, during which time he called the Donbas part of Ukraine. In addition, he also served as Chairman of the Donetsk Oblast Council prior to his term from 2010 to 2011, and briefly afterwards from March to April 2014.

== Early life ==
Shyshatskiy was born on 12 October 1965 in the city of Sloviansk, which was then part of the Ukrainian SSR in the Soviet Union. He is ethnically Ukrainian and is the son of Volodymyr Nikiforovich and Evgenia Georgievna. He has relatives in Volyn Oblast, including an aunt from Turiisk. His family were teachers of exact sciences and accountants. During secondary school, he attended School No. 5 in his native Sloviansk. After graduating from secondary school, he immediately did his mandatory service in the Soviet Army until 1986. In the army, he was the organiser of the Komsomol for his platoon and was stationed in the mountains of the Azerbaijani SSR. After returning to Ukraine, he completed his degree in labour economics at Donetsk National University in 1990, achieving the qualification of economist.

Upon graduating, his cousin got him a job as a standardising engineer at the Donetsk Large-Panel Housing Construction Plant (DZKPD), where he gradually progressed over five years, becoming deputy director of sales, head of the financial deputy, and finally deputy director of DZKPD. In 1995, he was finally promoted to director of DZKPD, which he held for eight years until 2003. In 2004, he resigned and moved to becoming the general director of the Khartsyzk pipe plant in the city of Khartsyzk. He stayed in this role for another four years, during which time he earned his Master of Business Administration at the International Institute of Management in 2007. After leaving Khartsyzsk in 2008, he became director of the Ukrainian State Research Institute of Plastic Masses for a year and then director of Donbas Pharmacy for another year. The latter, Donbas Pharmacy, is part of SCM Holdings, which is owned by oligarch Rinat Akhmetov. He would later be called one of "Akhmetov's men" for this connection.

== Political career ==
=== Early career ===
In 2001, Shyshatskiy joined the Party of Regions. He initially tried to enter national-level politics in 2006, running in the 2006 Ukrainian parliamentary elections as a candidate for the Verkhovna Rada on the party list of the Party of Regions (no. 228). However, he was not selected. After not being selected, he instead entered the Donetsk Oblast Council as a deputy that year. During his tenure, he was a member of the commission on social issues and health care, which he headed for eight months.

=== Chairman of the Donetsk Oblast Council (2010-11) ===
Shyshatskiy during the unveiling of a monument to Cyril and Methodius in 2011.

After Anatoliy Blyznyuk resigned to become Governor of Donetsk Oblast because Ukraine did not accept dual mandates, a secret ballot was held at the Donetsk Oblast Council to replace Blyznyuk as its chairman on 15 April 2010. Shyshatskiy was the only candidate on the ballot after being approved unanimously by the Party of Regions faction, which at the time held almost 80% of the council. The Communist Party of Ukraine nominated its deputy, Vladimir Ishko, but he immediately declined, as did Anatoliy Blyznyuk, who was nominated by a deputy of the Progressive Socialist Party of Ukraine, with the deputy justifying the nomination by saying that dual powers should not exist in the region. In the end, Shyshatskiy won the ballot and was elected chairman of the council for its V convocation with 99 out of 113 votes (8 voted against, 5 abstained, 1 was invalidated). After he won the vote, Shyshatskiy said he would support local self-government, would focus on unemployment, especially in smaller mining towns, and would increase taxes. He also said he would not "change of course" from his fellow Party of Regions predecessor, Blyznyuk.

After taking office, the Donetsk Oblast Council grew from 150 to 180 deputies, and he also split up commissions. At the time, in a Viche interview, he said the council's job was self-government programmes and the budget, and not higher-level issues like language (due to the ongoing debate between Russian and Ukrainian), which should've been taken up by the national authorities in accordance with the Constitution of Ukraine. On more local issues during his tenure, he ran a small community project competition with priorities for small villages, directed the oblast budget to dairy kitchens in Donetsk, Horlivka, and Makiivka, and worked on the ongoing water supply issues, which he called the key regional problem and said was his priority. Shyshatskiy said the main problem was that tariffs had long since been frozen and that there was too much excess water waste, and that tariffs on water would have to rise to pay the enterprise's debts.

=== Governor of Donetsk Oblast (2011-14) ===
Shyshatskiy speaking to protestors in Donetsk, 1 March 2014.

During rumours about Blyznyuk's early dismissal as part of an administrative shuffle, four candidates were rumoured to succeed him: Shyshatskiy, Oleksiy Bilyi (a people's deputy of the Verkhovna Rada), Oleksandr Kasyanyuk (also a people's deputy), and Oleksandr Klymenko (Deputy Chairman of the State Tax Service of Ukraine). On 12 July 2011, after Blyznyuk was actually transferred and appointed Minister of Regional Development, Shyshatskiy was chosen to replace him by presidential decree no. 749 under President Viktor Yanukovych. During his first conference upon being appointed, he said he would complete the previous unfinished projects from Blyznyuk (such as optimisation of schools, but that health care would be his main priority, including the implementation of new centres for primary and specialised care across the oblast to help the low human development index score for the oblast at the time.

In late 2011, Shyshatskiy signed orders for the oblast to become part of the Euroregion "Donbas" program, which had been proposed by Rostov Oblast in Russia and Luhansk Oblast. One of the main areas of the program would be to clean the Siverskyi Donets, which crosses through all three oblasts. Two years later, although he said the region had been struggling with declining coal sales after accidents and the market price of metal rising, Donetsk Oblast in draft received nearly 400 million hryvnias in development, which, along with Luhansk Oblast, accounted for nearly half of all the budget for individual territories. Shyshatskiy said this was justified since the oblast had a large percentage of the population and high industrial output. In regard to the long-stalled Donetsk Metro, Shyshatskiy said in February 2013 that he was in favour of abandoning it since it cost millions of hryvnias to maintain, but that the oblast could not make the decision as it was in the Ministry of Infrastructure's responsibility.

Early in February 2014, as protests in Kyiv worsened during Euromaidan, Shyshatskiy said the protests were pushing back the country towards the "Middle Ages" and that a potential war would produce no winners. He also said that the Verkhovna Rada was the only remaining "legitimate body". However, he also said that he saw Ukraine's future as "united, whole, and independent". On 1 March, with increasing pro-Russian rallies around Donetsk, he denied rumours that he would resign soon. On that same day, Pavel Gubarev was elected as governor of the region by pro-Russian protestors at Lenin Square in Donetsk. With the quickly deteriorating situation, acting president Oleksandr Turchynov replaced Shyshatskiy in the post with Serhiy Taruta the following day.

=== Second term as chairman (2014) and War in Donbas ===
Following his dismissal, in an extraordinary session of the Donetsk Oblast Council on 3 March 2014, Shyshatskiy was elected to return to the post of chairman with 117 votes out of 142. In his opening speech, he said that more power should be given to regions, and that instead of presidents appointing governors, they should be elected. He left the Party of Regions four days later, on 7 March. During subsequent calls for a referendum on the status of the Donbas and possible secession, he initially said there was no legislative basis for holding them, but a few days later, he approved creating a working group of the council regarding a potential referendum. Despite this, in a press conference on 24 March, he said that the council was not preparing a referendum and that he supported a united Ukraine, but with decentralisation and Russian remaining a regional language. He later published an open letter to the Verkhovna Rada requesting that Russian be given the right of an official state language as the majority of the oblast at the time spoke Russian. Ultimately, he announced on 9 April that he had written a letter of resignation as chairman, saying that the Party of Regions was responsible for the situation in the oblast since it was dominant in the council, and said that he supported the Donbas remaining in Ukraine. His resignation was affirmed on 24 April by the Donetsk Oblast Council by a secret ballot, in which 92 of the 100 deputies voted in favour.

== Personal life ==
He is married to Larisa Vitalievna, who worked as a laboratory assistant at Donetsk National University. They have three children: Pavel (born 1988), Olga (born 1997), and Artem. Pavel, as of 2011, works at FC Shakhtar Donetsk. In addition to his native languages, Andriy speaks the English language fluently.

On 16 July 2015, the Prosecutor's Office of Donetsk Oblast opened a criminal case against him alongside former Donetsk mayor Oleksandr Lukyanchenko on suspicion of treason and assisting with the creation of the Donetsk People's Republic. Two years later, on 12 December 2017, the prosecutor's office announced they had closed the proceedings after the pre-trial investigation had not found evidence.

== Honours and awards ==
Shyshatskiy has been awarded the following honours:

- Order of Merit, III degree (awarded in 2007)
- Order of Merit, II degree (awarded in 2012)
