= Roman Hryshchenko =

Ukrainian politician and army officer

- Роман Грищенко

15th Governor of Sumy Oblast
- In office 11 March 2020 – 5 November 2020
- Preceded by: Dmytro Zhyvytskyi
- Succeeded by: Serhiy Pakholchuk (acting)

Personal details
- Born: Roman Serhiyovych Hryschenko; 17 January 1982 (age 44) Katerynka, Ukrainian SSR, Soviet Union

Roman Serhiyovych Hryshchenko (Ukrainian: Роман Сергійович Грищенко; born on 17 January 1982), is a Ukrainian politician and army officer who had served as the 15th governor of Sumy Oblast in 2020.

He headed the 127th Heavy Mechanized Brigade. He was awarded the Knight of the Order of Bohdan Khmelnytsky III degree in 2022.

== Biography ==
Roman Serhiyovych Hryshchenko was born on 17 January 1982 in Katerynka, Pervomaisk Raion, Mykolaiv Oblast.

In 2005, he graduated from the Yaroslav Mudryi National Law University in Kharkiv, majoring in law.

From 2005 to 2007, he worked as an investigator of the military prosecutor's office of the Mykolaiv Garrison of the Southern Region of Ukraine in Mykolaiv.

From 2010 to 2019, he worked in the bodies of the military prosecutor's office of the Mykolaiv, Kirovohrad, Kryvyi Rih, Kyiv, and Kharkiv garrisons.

On 29 January 2020, the Cabinet of Ministers supported Hryshchenko's appointment as Chairman of the Sumy Regional State Administration.

On 11 March 2020, Hryschenko became the 15th governor of Sumy Oblast.

On 5 November, he was replaced by Serhiy Pakholchuk as the acting governor of the region.

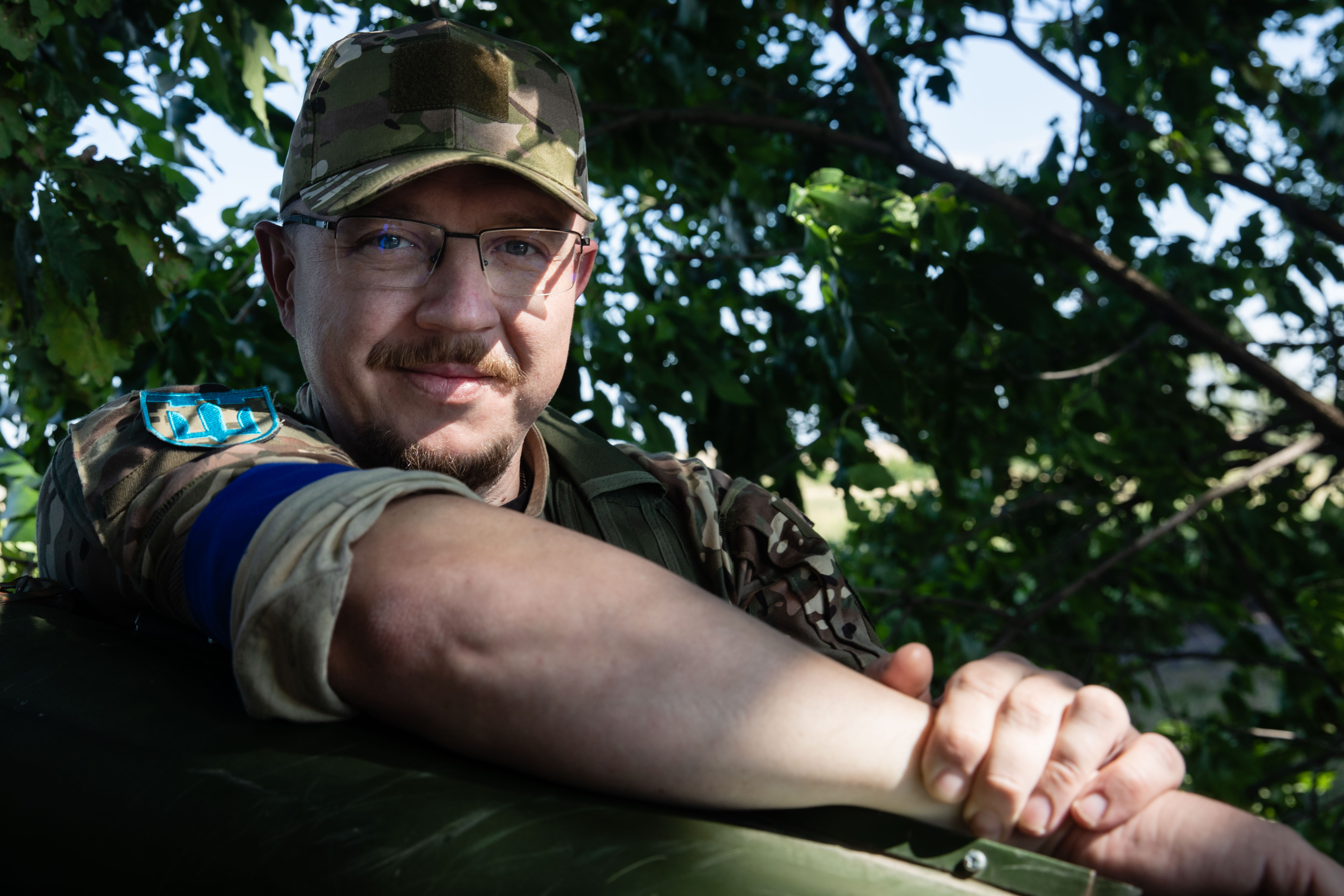
Hryshchenko in July 2022

From the beginning of the 2022 Russian large-scale invasion, he served in the 112th Territorial Defense Brigade as a gunner-operator, where he participated in the defense of the city of Kyiv. On 4 March 2022, he was assigned to the city of Kharkiv and headed the new 127th Heavy Mechanized Brigade. His call sign is "Uncle Roma" (Ukrainian: Дядя Рома, romanized: Diadia Roma).

On 24 May 2022, he was awarded the Order of Bohdan Khmelnytskyi (III degree) for personal courage and selfless actions shown in the defense of the state sovereignty and territorial integrity of Ukraine, and loyalty to the military oath.

== Personal life ==
Hryshchenko is married and has two children.
