= Mark Berfman =

Ukrainian politician (1939–2019)

- Марк Берфман
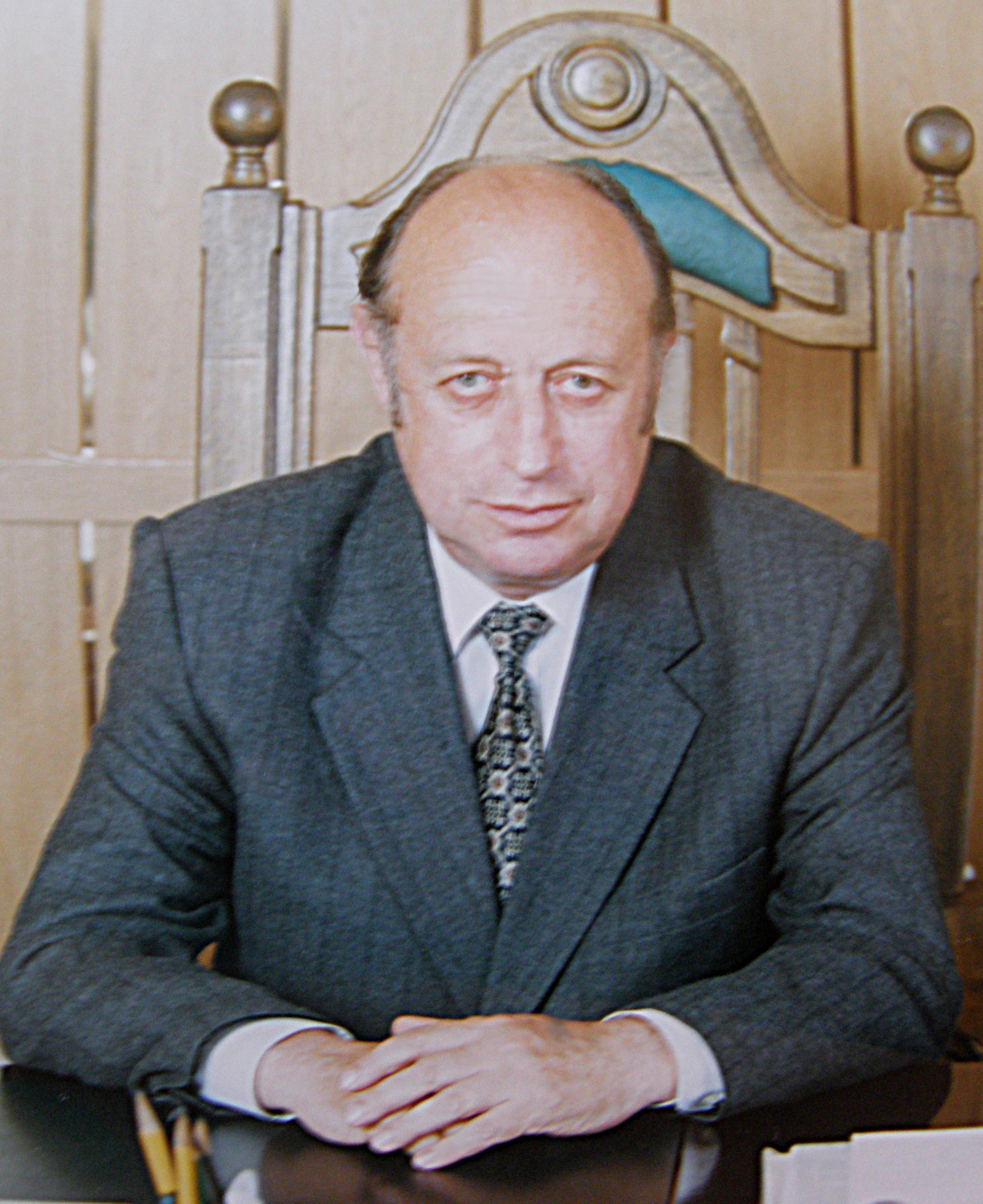

4th Chairman of the Sumy Oblast Council
- In office 7 July 1999 – 28 April 2006
- Preceded by: Anatoliy Yepifanov
- Succeeded by: Vyacheslav Shaposhnyk

2nd Governor of Sumy Oblast
- In office 8 May 1998 – 30 March 1999
- Preceded by: Anatoliy Yepifanov
- Succeeded by: Volodymyr Shcherban

Personal details
- Born: Mark Abramovych Berfman; 7 July 1939 Sumy, Soviet Union
- Died: 2 December 2019 (aged 80) Israel
- Party: Liberal Party of Ukraine

Mark Abramovych Berfman (Ukrainian: Марк Абрамович Берфман; 7 July 1939 – 2 December 2019), was a Ukrainian politician and economist who served as the chairman of Sumy Oblast Council from 1999 to 2006.

He also served as the 2nd Governor of Sumy Oblast from 1998 to 1999.

== Biography ==
Mark Berfman was born in Sumy on 7 July 1939 to Jewish parents, father Abram Isakovych (1914–1941), and mother Liya Isakivna.

In 1964 he graduated from the Poltava Engineering and Construction Institute with a degree in Industrial and Civil Construction.

He began his career in 1965 as an engineer, the deputy head of department in Aleysk. He also worked in the positions of a master, supervisor, economist, head of department, deputy chief engineer in construction organizations, chief technologist, deputy chief of the plant "Sumprombud", first deputy chief of the project and production association "Sumbud".

In May 1992 he was the Head of the Capital Construction Department, Deputy Chairman of the Sumy Regional Council for Executive Work, Head of the Department of Economics of the Regional Executive Committee, the first deputy chairman of the regional executive committee, the first deputy head of the regional state administration in the state administration of Sumy region.

On 8 May 1998, Berfman was appointed 2nd Governor of Sumy Oblast. At the same time, he was elected a deputy of the Sumy Regional Council of People's Deputies.

On 30 March 1999, without significant political weight in the region, Berfman was unable to influence the political situation sufficiently, which was unacceptable before the approaching presidential elections, resulting in his dismissal.

On 6 July, he was elected chairman of the Sumy Regional Council of People's Deputies, with 40 deputies voting for him, and 29 voting for his opponent, Volodymyr Shevchenko.

On 28 April 2006, Vyacheslav Shaposhnyk replaced him as his successor as the chairman.

Mark Abramovych Berfman died in Israel on 2 December 2019.

== Family ==
He was married to his wife, Arina Andriyivna, who worked as an engineer of the Sumy department of the Southern Railway. The couple had a daughter, Inna Zakharchenko (nee Berfman), who is now retired.
