= Akhat Bragin =

Ukrainian businessman (1953–1995)

- Ахать Хафізович Брагін
- Born: Akhat Khafizovich Bragin; February 26, 1953; Stalino, Ukrainian SSR, Soviet Union (now Donetsk, Ukraine)
- Died: October 15, 1995 (aged 42); Shakhtar Stadium, Donetsk, Ukraine
- Other name: Alik the Greek
- Education: Donetsk Institute of Soviet Trading (dropout)
- Occupations: Businessman, football club president, organised crime figure
- Title: President of FC Shakhtar Donetsk
- Term: 1994–1995
- Successor: Rinat Akhmetov
- Children: 2

Akhat (Alexander) Khafizovich (Sergeevich) Bragin (Ukrainian: Ахать (Олександр) Хафізович (Сергійович) Брагін, Russian: Ахать (Александр) Хафизович (Сергеевич) Брагин, Tatar: Әхәт (Александр) Хафиз улы Брагин; 1953 — 15 October 1995) was a Ukrainian businessman of Volga Tatar descent. He was a mafia figure of the Donetsk Oblast and later the president of the football club Shakhtar Donetsk until his death.

== Biography ==
Akhat Hafizovich Bragin was born in 1953 in the Kuibyshevskyi District of Donetsk city, Ukrainian SSR. Before he became the president of Shakhtar Donetsk, he was also a butcher at a local market in Oktyabrsky Raion.

== Education ==
Donetsk Soviet Trade Institute (today Donetsk National University of Economy and Trade), dropped out.

== Convictions ==
- 24 November 1971 – convicted (the Criminal Code of Ukraine) by the Kuibyshev District Court of Donetsk to a conditional year of imprisonment with correctional term of 2 years without confiscation of property

== Personal life ==
Bragin had a wife and two children.

== Assassination and attempts ==
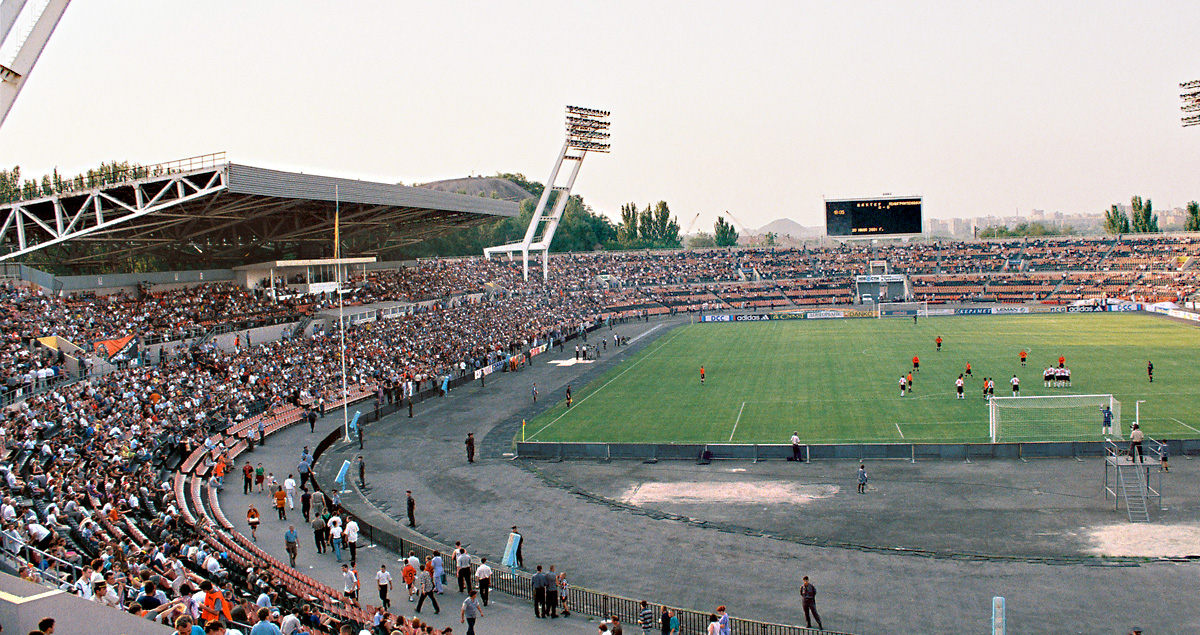
Shakhtar Stadium in Donetsk in 2001, 6 years after Bragin's assassination

An attempt to kill Bragin took place on 19 March 1994 at Pisky (Bragin's hometown). Pisky, Yasynuvata Raion is a rural settlement of Yasynuvata Raion, just to the west from the Donetsk International Airport. A group of bandits from the Ryabin-Kushnir gang (run by Yevhen Kushnir and Anatoliy Ryabi) opened fire on Bragin's pigeon coop while Bragin was visiting his birds. Bragin survived the attempt.

Bragin died in a bomb attack on Sunday 15 October 1995 at the Shakhtar Stadium in Donetsk. After this event, Rinat Akhmetov became president and chairman of Shaktar Donetsk. The reason for Akhat's murder was his business dealings. Known in the criminal underworld as 'Alik the Greek', his organization got into conflicts with several others. The investigation into his death made little progress until the confession of a rival gangster, which led to the arrest and imprisonment of former policeman Vyacheslav Synenko.

== Legacy ==
In honor of Akhat Bragin, the mosque of Donetsk is called Ahat Jami.

== See also ==
- List of unsolved murders (1980–1999)
- Yevhen Shcherban
