= Iryna Kupreychyk =

Ukrainian politician (born 1971)

- Ірина Купрейчик
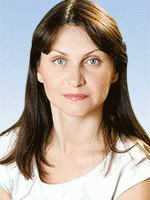
- Kupreychyk in 2012

People's Deputy of Ukraine
- In office 12 December 2012 – 27 November 2014
- Preceded by: Constituency re-established
- Succeeded by: Vladyslav Bukhariev
- Constituency: Sumy Oblast, No. 162

Acting Governor of Sumy Oblast
- In office 25 June 2019 – 11 March 2020
- Preceded by: Vadym Akperov (acting)
- Succeeded by: Dmytro Zhyvytskyi

Personal details
- Born: 12 June 1971 (age 53); Chernihiv, Ukrainian SSR, Soviet Union (now Ukraine)
- Political party: Batkivshchyna

Iryna Valeriyivna Kupreychyk (Ukrainian: Ірина Валеріївна Купрейчик; born 12 June 1971) is a Ukrainian politician who served as a People's Deputy of Ukraine from Ukraine's 162nd electoral district from 2012 to 2014. She was later the acting Governor of Sumy Oblast from 2019 until 2020.

== Early life and education ==
Kupreychyk was born in Chernihiv on 12 June 1971. In 1993, she graduated from the Faculty of Computer Engineering and Management of Kharkiv National University of Radioelectronics.

== Political career ==
From November 2010 to December 2012, Kupreychyk was a Deputy of the Sumy Regional Council representing the "Front of Change" party, No. 2 on the list. She was a member of the commission on agro-industrial complex and social development of the village. She was the director of "Niva-Agrotech" LLC, a company engaged in the cultivation of grain and technical crops.

From 12 December 2012 to 27 November 2014, Kupreychyk was a People's Deputy of Ukraine of the 7th convocation from the Batkivshchyna party from Ukraine's 162nd electoral district. She received 34.55% of the vote. She was Chairman of the Subcommittee on Criminal Procedure Legislation of the Verkhovna Rada Committee on the Rule of Law and Justice, member of the Counting Commission

On 11 March 2015, Kupreychyk was appointed the deputy head of the Sumy Regional State Administration. From 29 June 2019 to 11 March 2020, she was acting head of the Sumy Regional State Administration. Since 4 December 2020, she is a member of the Sumy City Council from the "Strength and Honor" party.

== Personal life ==
Kypreyshyk has two children, Karyna and Pavlo.
