= Korovyntsi =

Village in Sumy Oblast, Ukraine

Korovyntsi Коровинці
- Village
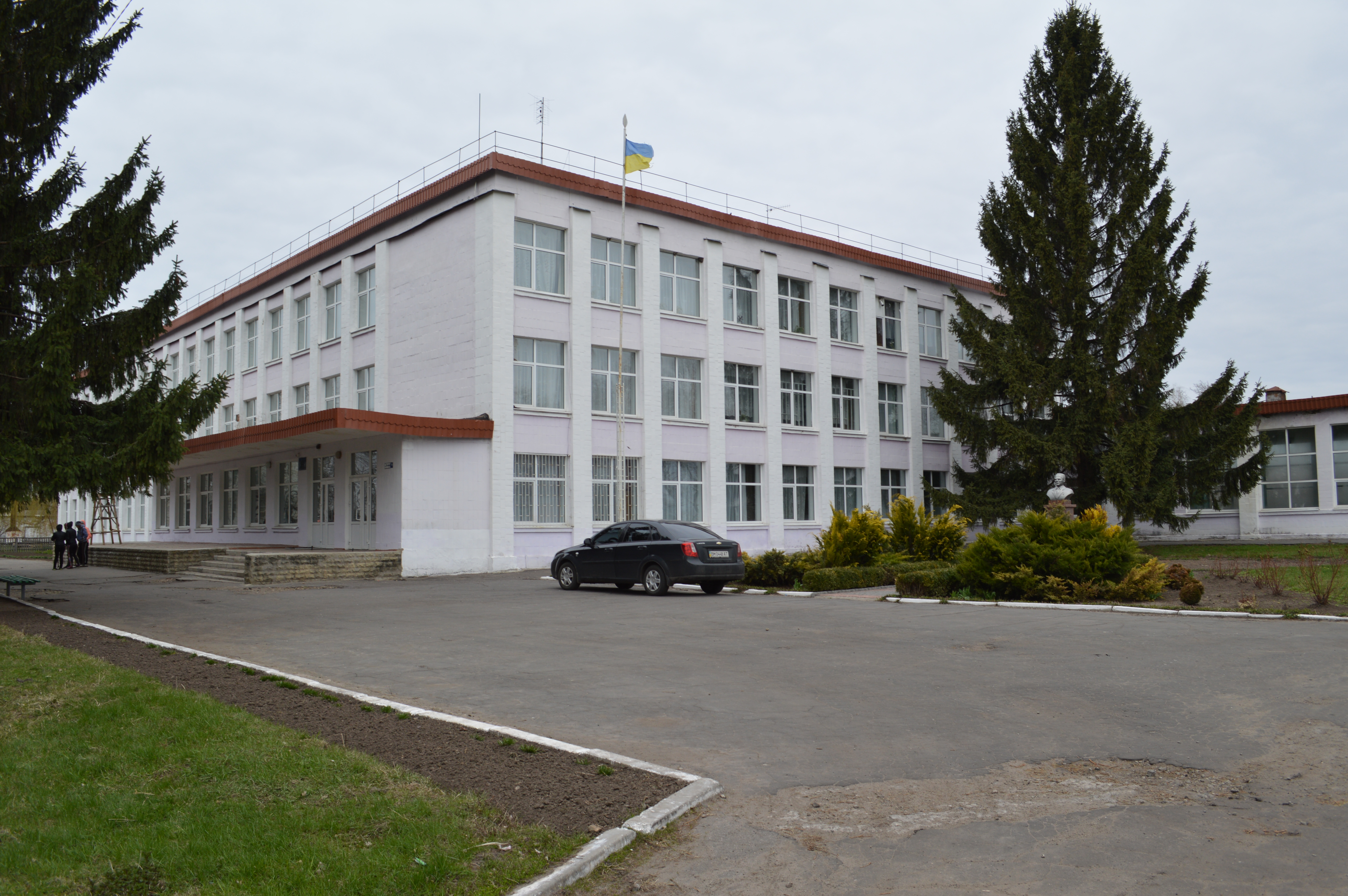
- Korovyntsi's school

- Location of Korovyntsi in Sumy Oblast Location of Korovyntsi in Ukraine
- Coordinates: 50°48′32″N 33°45′01″E
- Country: Ukraine
- Oblast: Sumy Oblast
- Raion: Romny Raion
- Hromada: Korovyntsi rural hromada
- First mentioned: 17th century

Population
  - Total: 2,702

Korovyntsi (Ukrainian: Коровинці) is a village in Romny Raion, in Ukraine's central Sumy Oblast. It is the centre of Korovyntsi rural hromada, one of the hromadas of Ukraine. Its population is 2,702 (as of 2024).

== History ==
Korovyntsi was first mentioned at some point in the 17th century. It was occupied by the Red Army in January 1918 during the Ukrainian–Soviet War. The village was also the location of battles between the Red Army and Nestor Makhno's Revolutionary Insurgent Army of Ukraine.

During the Russian invasion of Ukraine, an underground network of Ukrainian partisans fought against Russian military forces. A "green corridor" for refugees was also planned to go through the village during the invasion.

Vyshyvankas from Korovyntsi are notable for their unique floral patterns on the sleeves of the vyshyvanka.

== Notable people ==
- Mykola Khymchenko, Ukrainian Soviet politician.
- Mykola Lavryk, politician; People's Deputy of Ukraine, Governor of Sumy Oblast.
- Vira Lavryk, politician.
- Anastasia Ripa, Soviet collective farm worker and politician.
- Olha Serdiuk, Hero of Socialist Labour.
- Anatolii Yepifanov, politician; Governor of Sumy Oblast.
