= Dmytro Zhyvytskyi =

Ukrainian politician

- Дмитро Живицький
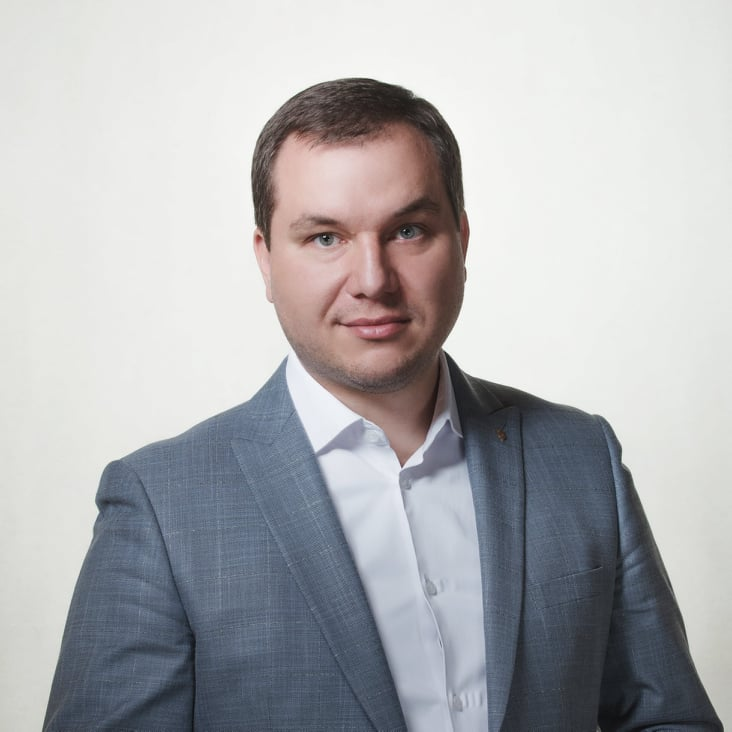

14th and 17th Governor of Sumy Oblast
- In office 25 June 2021 – 24 January 2023
- Preceded by: Vasyl Khoma
- Succeeded by: Taras Savchenko (acting)
- In office 13 February 2020 – 11 March 2020
- Preceded by: Iryna Kupreychyk (acting)
- Succeeded by: Roman Hryschenko

Deputy Minister of Infrastructure
- In office 23 September 2020 – 25 June 2021

Personal details
- Born: Dmytro Oleksiyovych Zhyvytskyi; 17 September 1982 (age 43) Sumy, Ukrainian SSR, Soviet Union
- Political party: Power of the People

Dmytro Oleksiyovych Zhyvytskyi (Ukrainian: Дмитро Олексійович Живицький; born on 17 September 1982), is a Ukrainian politician, entrepreneur, public figure, and civil servant who was the Governor of Sumy Oblast from 25 June 2021 until 24 January 2023. He was previously the Deputy Minister of Infrastructure of Ukraine.

He had already served as Governor of Sumy Oblast in 2020.

== Biography ==
Dmytro Zhyvytskyi was born in Sumy on 17 September 1982.

From 1999 to 2004, he studied at the Sumy State University, Faculty of Engineering, specialty: equipment of chemical productions and enterprises of building materials, specialization: machines and devices of chemical and gas-oil refining productions. He received a master's degree and a diploma with honors.

From September 2001 to February 2002, he worked at the Sumchanka-Tepigtar LLC, with the production of corrugated cardboard.

Between August 2002 and April 2005, he worked at the Suminaftoprodukt Open Joint Stock Company. At the same time, he was the Deputy Technical Director for Operation and Repair of Oil Bases and Gas Stations.

In 2004, he defended a research paper with honors on "Analysis of methods of utilization of vapors of light petroleum products during storage at oil depots." He developed an ejection unit for the absorption of gasoline vapors during storage at oil depots.

From April 2005 to July 2005, he worked at OJSC “SMNVO them. Frunze », as a design engineer of the special design bureau of turbochargers, at the department of gas pumping units.

From December 2005 to April 2016, he became an individual entrepreneur, at Engineering and Technical Center "Modern Security Technologies", selling installation and maintenance of automation and technical means of protection.

From November to December 2006, he was part of the School of Leaders in Warsaw.

In May 2008, he was an intern in the Swedish Parliament in Stockholm, studying of the interaction of the Swedish legislature with other public authorities and the public.

In 2010, 2012 and 2014, he was part of the internship in the Chamber of Commerce of the canton of Ticino ("Camera di commercio") in Lugano, Switzerland.

In 2013, he was at TUV Rheinland AkademieGmbH, in which he was part of the management training program of the Federal Ministry of Economics and Technology of Germany (language of instruction and internship in English) in Cologne.

From July to October 2014, he was at the School of Political Leaders of the Eastern Partnership countries, between Kyiv and Warsaw. As the instruction is spoken in English, as part of the training, he took an internship in the Parliament and the Office of the President of Poland, participated in the OSCE conference.

From 2015 to 2016. he was the President of the NGO "Urban Development Agency", in Sumy, developing Sumy of a development strategy.

From May to September 2015, he was in Kyiv-Mohyla Business School (kmbs) - “School of Mayors”, internship in the municipalities of Polish cities: Krakow, Lublin, Poznan at the invitation of the Association of Polish Cities.

Between April 2016 and September 2019, Zhyvytskyi was part of the Sumy Regional State Administration, as a Deputy Chairman - Chief of Staff, and a member of the Council of Entrepreneurs at the Sumy Regional State Administration. He was the general manager of the Sumy Regional State Administration, communication with high-level public authorities, organization of working trips of the President and Prime Minister of Ukraine, improvement of public administration, prevention of corruption, information policy, public relations, housing and communal services, energy saving, promotion and tourism, internal audit, agro-industrial complex, ecology and nature management, operation of fuel and energy complex.

In September 2016, he was a participant of the 13th annual meeting of the Yalta European Strategy in Kyiv.

From February to March 2017, he was at the Kyiv-Mohyla Business School (kmbs), where he participated in the project "DevelopUkraine", was trained at the "School of Cluster Development" and LevelUp, and received a certificate of a cluster manager.

From 2018 to 2019, he studied at the National Academy of Public Administration under the President of Ukraine, specialty: "Public Administration". He received a master's degree.

From September 2019 to March 2020, Zhyvytskyi was the First Deputy Minister Ministry of Development of Communities and Territories of Ukraine, addressing the issues of regional development, housing and communal services, energy efficiency, state property management. From the Government of Ukraine he was the national coordinator of international projects and MFI projects (Danube Transnational Program, World Bank, European Investment Bank), carried out general project management, was responsible for organizing, controlling and monitoring project implementation activities.

On 13 March 2020, Zhyvytskyi was appointed Governor of Sumy Oblast.

He was succeeded by Roman Hryschenko on 11 March.

On 23 September 2020, Zhyvytskyi was appointed Deputy Minister of Infrastructure of Ukraine.

On 25 June 2021, Zhyvytskyi was appointed as the Governor of Sumy Oblast again. He was removed from this position on 24 January 2023.

== Personal life ==
Zhyvytsky is married to Darya Zhivitska. She is engaged in entrepreneurial activity. Since March 2020, its main activities are other types of retail trade outside stores.

The couple has two daughters: Solomiya and Miroslava.
