= Kostiantynivka, Krasnokutsk settlement hromada, Bohodukhiv Raion, Kharkiv Oblast =

Rural locality in Kharkiv Oblast, Ukraine

Kostiantynivka Костянтинівка
- Village
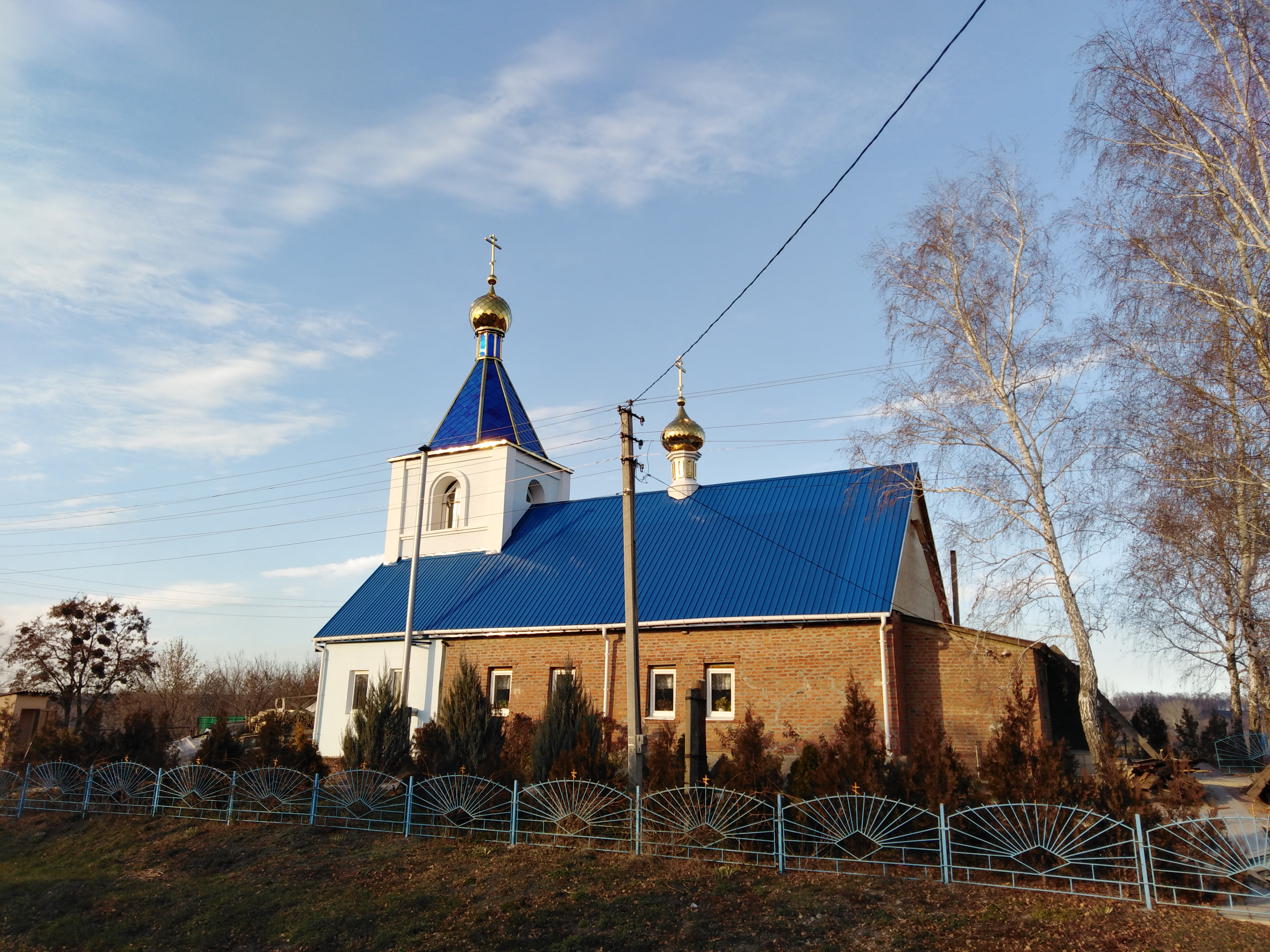
- Church of the Nativity of the Virgin

- Location within Kharkiv Oblast Location within Ukraine
- Coordinates: 49°56′59″N 35°06′19″E
- Country: Ukraine
- Oblast: Kharkiv Oblast
- Raion: Bohodukhiv Raion

Population (2021)
  - Total: 1,127
- Time zone: UTC+2 (EET)
  - Summer (DST): UTC+3 (EEST)

Kostiantynivka (Ukrainian: Костянтинівка, Russian: Константиновка) is a village in Bohodukhiv Raion of Kharkiv Oblast in Ukraine. Kostiantynivka belongs to Krasnokutsk settlement hromada, one of the hromadas of Ukraine. Population: 1,127 (2021 est.).

Until 18 July 2020, Kostiantynivka belonged to Krasnokutsk Raion. The raion was abolished in July 2020 as part of the administrative reform of Ukraine, which reduced the number of raions of Kharkiv Oblast to seven. The area of Krasnokutsk Raion was merged into Bohodukhiv Raion.

In 2021, Kostiantynivka had the status of urban-type settlement removed and became a selo.

== Economy ==
=== Transportation ===
The closest railway station, Kolomak, is in the selo of Shelestove, approximately 15 kilometres (9.3 mi) southeast of the settlement. It is on the railway connecting Kharkiv and Poltava. There is some passenger traffic.

The settlement has access on the south, via Kolomak, to Highway M03 which connects Kharkiv with Kyiv, and on the west to Highway H12 connecting Poltava and Sumy.
