= Governor of Sumy Oblast =

Chief executive of Sumy Oblast, Ukraine

Head of military administration of Sumy Oblast
- Seal of Sumy Oblast

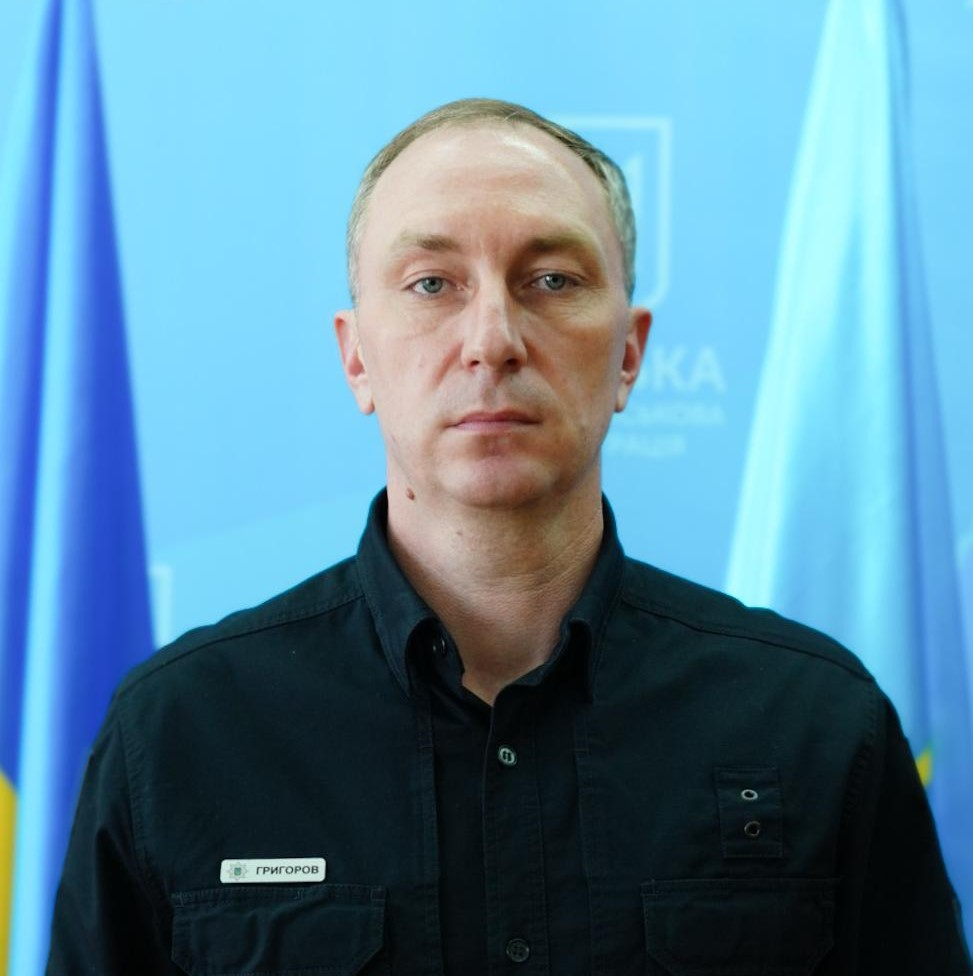
- Incumbent; Oleh Hryhorov (Note: Ukrainian: Олег Григоров) since 17 April 2025
- Residence: Sumy
- Term length: Four years
- Inaugural holder: Anatoliy Yepifanov; 1992–1994
- Formation: 1992 as Presidential representative
- Website: Government of Sumy Oblast

The governor of Sumy Oblast is the head of executive branch for the Sumy Oblast.

The office of governor is an appointed position, with officeholders being appointed by the president of Ukraine, on recommendation from the prime minister of Ukraine, to serve four-year term.

The official residence for the governor is located in Sumy.

== Governors ==
No.	Image	Name	Party	Term	Notes
1.		Anatoliy Yepifanov		1992–1998	Presidential representative until 1994
2.		Mark Berfman		1998–1999	
3.		Volodymyr Shcherban	Liberal Party of Ukraine	1999–2002	First term
-		Yuriy Zharkov		2002	Acting
4.		Volodymyr Shcherban	For United Ukraine! (2002); Our Ukraine	2002–2005	Second term
5.		Mykola Lavryk		2005	First term
6.		Nina Harkava		2005-2006	
7.		Volodymyr Sapsai		2006	
8.		Pavlo Kachur	People's Movement of Ukraine	2006-2008	
9.		Mykola Lavryk		2008-2010	Second term, acting until 2009
10.		Yuriy Chmyr	Party of Regions	2010-2013	
11.		Ihor Yahovdyk		2013-2014	
12.		Volodymyr Shulha		2014	
-		Viktor Chernyavskyi		2014	Acting
-		Ivan Borshosh		2014	Acting
13.		Mykola Klochko		2014-2019	
-		Vadym Akperov		2019	Acting
-		Iryna Kupreychyk	Batkivshchyna	2019-2020	Acting
14.		Dmytro Zhyvytskyi		2020	First term.
15.		Roman Hryschenko		2020	
-		Serhiy Pakholchuk		2020	Acting
16.		Vasyl Khoma		2020-2021	
17.		Dmytro Zhyvytskyi		2021-2023	Second term.
-		Taras Savchenko		2023	Acting
18.		Volodymyr Artyukh		2023-2025	Head of military administration
19.		Oleh Hryhorov		2025-	

== Sources ==
- World Statesmen.org
