= Viktor Tikhonov (politician) =

Ukrainian politician (1949–2020)

Viktor Tykhonov
- Віктор Тихонов
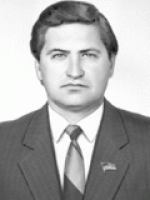

Ambassador to Belarus
- In office 1 June 2011 – 26 November 2012
- Preceded by: Roman Bezsmertnyi
- Succeeded by: Mykhailo Yezhel

Vice Prime Minister of Ukraine
- In office 11 March 2010 – 1 June 2011
- Prime Minister: Mykola Azarov

Chairman of the Luhansk Oblast Council
- In office 24 April 1998 – April 2006
- Preceded by: Leonid Dayneko
- Succeeded by: Valeriy Holenko

Deputy Governor of Luhansk Oblast
- In office November 1995 – April 1998
- Governor: Hennadiy Fomenko

Member of the Verkhovna Rada
- In office 15 May 1990 – 10 May 1994
- In office 25 May 2006 – 27 November 2014

Personal details
- Born: 5 March 1949 Antratsyt Raion, Luhansk Oblast, Ukrainian SSR, Soviet Union
- Died: 29 August 2020 (aged 71) Simferopol, Crimea
- Party: Party of Regions

Viktor Mykolayovych Tikhonov (Ukrainian: Віктор Миколайович Тихонов; 5 March 1949 – 29 August 2020), also spelled Viktor Tykhonov, was a Ukrainian politician.

== Early life ==
Tikhonov was born on 5 March 1949 in Shchotove, which was then part of the Ukrainian SSR in the Soviet Union. He was ethnically Russian. After graduating secondary school, he worked at the "Voroshylovhradteplovoz" plant, before completing his mandatory military service with the Soviet Armed Forces in Odesa. In 1978, he graduated from the Voroshilovgrad Machinebuilding Institute, before returning to work at Voroshylovhradteplovoz, where he held various engineering and trade unionship leadership roles until 1990. He later received a degree in law from the Luhansk Institute of Internal Affairs, and was granted the title of Candidate of Legal Sciences in 2003.

== Political career ==
For a year before the collapse of the Soviet Union, he served as First Secretary of the Luhansk City Committee (or mayor of the city).

Tikhonov served in the Verkhovna Rada from 1990 to 1994 for electoral district 52 in Luhansk and again from 2006 to 2014 as a member of the Party of Regions. He also served as the First Vice Prime Minister of Ukraine from 11 March 2010 until 1 June 2011, with the Cabinet of Prime Minister Mykola Azarov.

Additionally, Tikhonov was chairman of the Luhansk Regional Council in eastern Ukraine from 1998 to 2006. He also served as the ambassador to Belarus from 2011 to 2012.

== Legal issues ==
In 2004, he was a participant in the Sievierodonetsk Congress, which called for an autonomous south-eastern republic from Ukraine if Viktor Yanukovych was not certified as President of Ukraine. For this, in 2005, the Prosecutor General's Office opened a case against him under Article 109 of the Criminal Code of Ukraine, but the case did not proceed.

In September 2014, after his departure from Ukraine following the events of Euromaidan, the Ministry of Internal Affairs opened a criminal case against him for participating in a plenary session of the Russian State Duma, during which he met with Speaker of the Duma Sergei Naryshkin.

== Personal life ==
In a 2016 interview, Tikhonov stated that he now permanently lived in Russian-occupied Crimea.

Viktor Tikhonov died from pneumonia in Simferopol on 29 August 2020, at the age of 71.
