= Yuriy Smyrnov =

Russian-Ukrainian politician (born 1939)

Yurii Smyrnov
- Юрій Смирнов
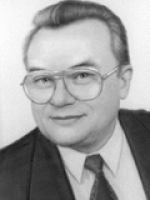

Presidential Representative of Donetsk Oblast
- In office 20 March 1992 – 14 March 1995

Member of the Verkhovna Rada
- In office 15 May 1990 – 18 June 1992

Personal details
- Born: Yurii Kostyantynovych Smyrnov; 2 June 1939 (age 86) Kologriv, Russian SFSR, Soviet Union

Yurii Kostyantynovych Smyrnov (Ukrainian: Юрій Костянтинович Смирнов; born 2 June 1939), is a Russian-born Ukrainian politician who served as the Presidential Representative of Donetsk Oblast from 1992 to 1995.

Smyrnov served as a State Advisor to the 2nd Customs Service of the Donbas Regional Customs, and was its head from 1997 to 1999. He also served as a member of the Verkhovna Rada's 1st convocation from 1990 to 1992.

== Biography ==
Smyrnov was born Yury Kostantinovich Smirnov on 2 June 1939 in Kologriv, Kostroma Oblast to his ethnic-Russian parents, Konstantin Konstantinovich (1915-1941) who served during the Second World War until his death, and his mother, Tatiana (1915-1998) who had been an employee.

In 1962, he had been a student, press engineer-technologist, and had been the head of the workshop of the Artemivsky Plant "Victory of Labor". He attended the Ukrainian Correspondence Polytechnic Institute between 1963 and 1969, and had been a mechanical engineer, at the Academy of Social Sciences at the CPSU Central Committee. By 1963, he joined the Communist Party of the Soviet Union.

In 1972, Smyrnov was an instructor of the Industrial Department, Second Secretary of the Artemivskyi MK of the Communist Party of Ukraine. In 1978, he was the Director of the Artemivska Alabaster Plant. In 1980, he was demoted to first secretary of the Artemivsky MK KPU. In 1983, he became the Head of the Light Industry Department and People's Consumption of Donetsk OK CPU. In June 1987, Smyrnov had been the Second Chairman of the Executive Committee of the Donetsk Regional Council.

On 3 April 1990, Smyrnov was elected a member of parliament, People's Deputy of Ukraine, 1st round 55.71% of votes, 3 applicants to the Verkhovna Rada. At the same time, he became Chairman of the Donetsk Regional Council of People's Deputies for the second term. On 15 May, he was sworn into office representing Krasnyi Lyman constituency No. 130, Donetsk Oblast, and was a member of the commission on the activities of the Soviets of People's Deputies, development of local self-government.

On 20 March 1992, Smyrnov was appointed the Presidential Representative of Donetsk Oblast. He received rank of the 1st class civil servant in April 1994. Between September 1994 and 1997, he was the Head of the Southeast Territorial Customs Administration of the academy of the Academy of Economic Sciences of Ukraine.

On 14 March 1995, Smyrnov left office in transition for the formation of the executive branch of the Donetsk Oblast. From 1997 to 1999 he was the chief condensional adviser to the customs service of the 2nd rank as the Donbas regional customs.

== Family ==
Smyrnov is married to Marharita Ivanivna since 1938, a pensioner. The couple have two children, Olena (born 1964), a doctor; and Kostyantyn (born 1971), an engineer.
