= Serhii Polyakov =

Ukrainian politician

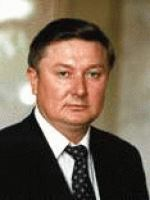
Serhii Polyakov, 1998

Serhii Vasylyovych Polyakov (Ukrainian: Сергій Васильович Поляков; born January 23, 1953) is a Ukrainian engineer and politician, former head of the Donetsk Oblast Administration, Minister of Environmental Protection of Ukraine (2003–2005), Minister of Coal Industry of Ukraine (1995–1996), member of Verkhovna Rada, associated with the political party Hromada.
