= Donetsk Oblast Council =

Regional body of Donetsk, Ukraine

Type
- Type: Unicameral
- Houses: 1

History
- Established: 1991; 35 years ago
- Disbanded: 9 April 2014; 12 years ago

Leadership
- Speaker: Andriy Shyshatskiy (last)

Structure
- Seats: 180
- Political groups: Government (166): Party of Regions (166); Opposition (14): Communist Party of Ukraine (9); Strong Ukraine (4); Agrarian Party of Ukraine (1)

Elections
- First election: 26 June 1994
- Last election: 31 October 2010

Meeting place
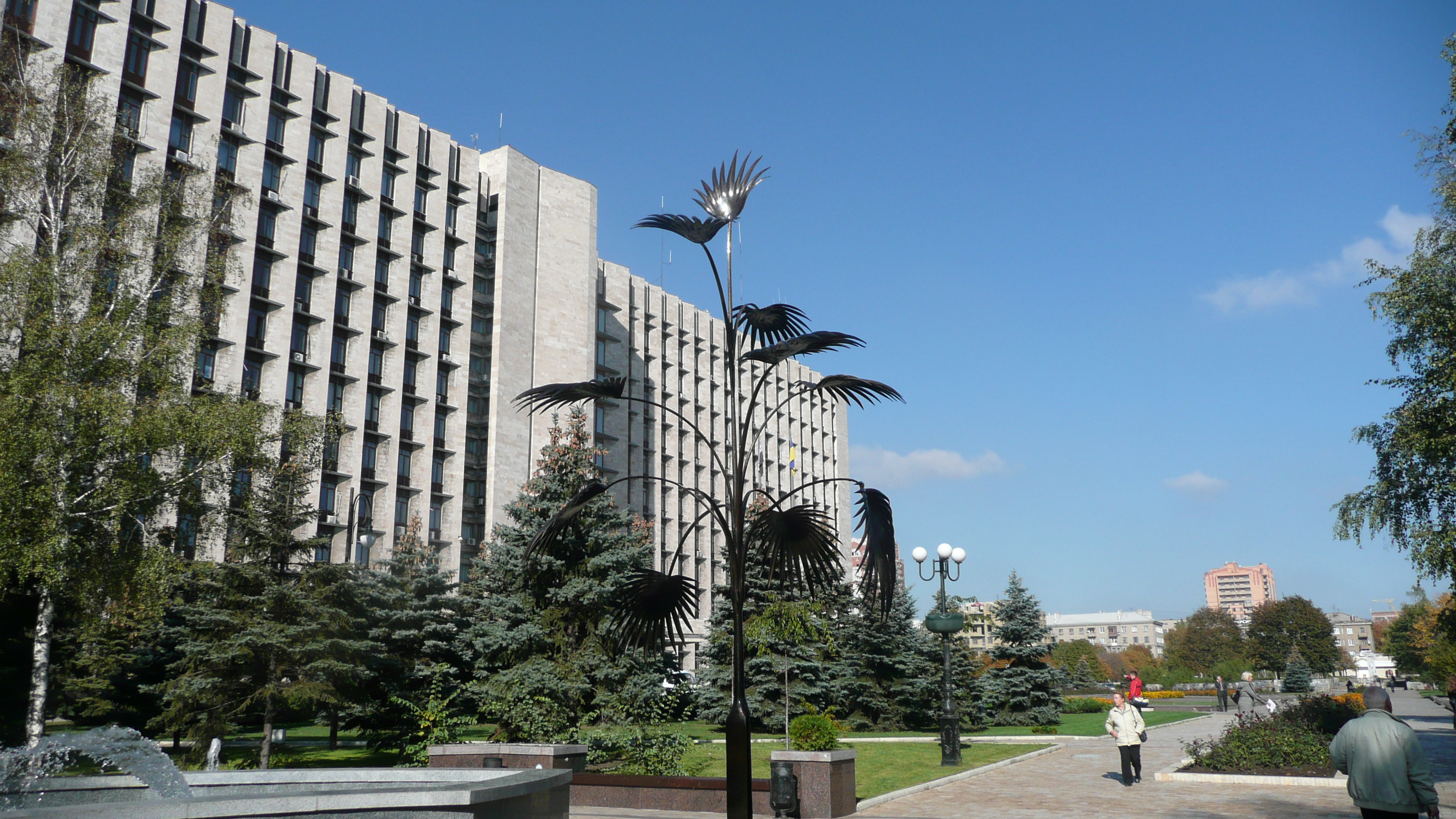
- Donetsk, Donetsk Oblast

Website
- sovet.donbass.com

The Donetsk Oblast Council (Ukrainian: Донецька обласна рада; Russian: Донецкий областной совет) is the regional oblast council (parliament) of the Donetsk Oblast (province) located in eastern Ukraine.

In Ukraine Oblast Council members are elected for five year terms. In order to gain representation in the council, a party must gain more than 5 percent of the total vote.

Following the 2014 start of the War in Donbass elections for the Donetsk Oblast Council have not been held and their functions are currently being performed by a civil–military administration.

The Oblast Council was unilaterally proclaimed to have been disbanded by the Donetsk People's Republic authorities and replaced by the People's Council in 2014, although the Oblast Council still operates de jure as the oblast's parliament in Ukraine.

== Chairmen ==
=== Regional executive committee ===
- Mikhail Nalimov (July 29–September 1932)
- Mikhail Chuvyrin (September 19, 1932–March 1933)
- Nikolai Ivanov (March 1933–July 1937)
- Vladimir Vsevolozhsky (July–November 1937)
- Peter Shpileva (acting; November 1937–June 1938)
- Peter Shpileva (June 1938–May 1939)
- Anton Gaevoy (acting; June–August 1939)
- Anton Gaevoy (August 1939–December 1940)
- Philip Reshetnyak (acting; December 1940–April 9, 1941)
- Philip Reshetnyak (April 9–October 26, 1941; September 1943–March 1944)
- Alexander Struev (acting; April–June 1944)
- Alexander Struev (June 1944–July 1947)
- Nikolai Alishev (July 1947–June 1949)
- Mark Spivak (June 1949–August 1950)
- Viktor Kremenitsky (August 1950–March 1954)
- Daniel Adamets (March 1954–May 1956)
- Nikolay Blagun (August 1956–March 1959)
- Dmitry Gridasov (March 1959–January 1963)
- Victor Pokhodin (January 1963–December 1964; agrarian)
- Dmitry Gridasov (January 1963–December 1964; industrial)
- Dmitry Gridasov (December 1964–July 1982)
- Vasily Mironov (July–October 1982)
- Anatoly Statinov (October 1982–December 1987)
- Viktor Kucherenko (December 1987–August 25, 1989)
- Yuriy Smyrnov (August 25, 1989–April 3, 1990)
- Volodymyr Sheludchenko (April 11–December 20, 1990)
- Yuriy Smyrnov (December 20, 1990–April 1992)

=== Regional council ===
- Yuriy Smyrnov (December 20, 1990–April 1992)
- Oleksii Petrenko (April–August 2, 1992)
- Vadym Chuprun (November 12, 1992–July 1994)
- Volodymyr Shcherban (July 10, 1994–October 4, 1996)
- Ivan Ponomaryov (October 4, 1996–May 14, 1999)
- Viktor Yanukovych (May 14, 1999–May 14, 2001)
- Borys Kolesnikov (May 2001–April 2005)
- Anatoliy Blyznyuk (acting; May–August 4, 2005)
- Borys Kolesnikov (August 4, 2005–April 25, 2006)
- Anatoliy Blyznyuk (April 26, 2006–April 15, 2010)
- Andriy Shyshatskiy (April 15, 2010–July 12, 2011)
- Andriy Fedoruk (acting; July 2011–August 4, 2011)
- Andriy Fedoruk (August 4, 2011–March 3, 2014)
- Andriy Shyshatsky (March 3, 2014–April 9, 2014)
- vacant (April 9, 2014–present)
