= Kyiv =

Capital and largest city of Ukraine

Kyiv Київ Kiev
- Capital city and city with special status
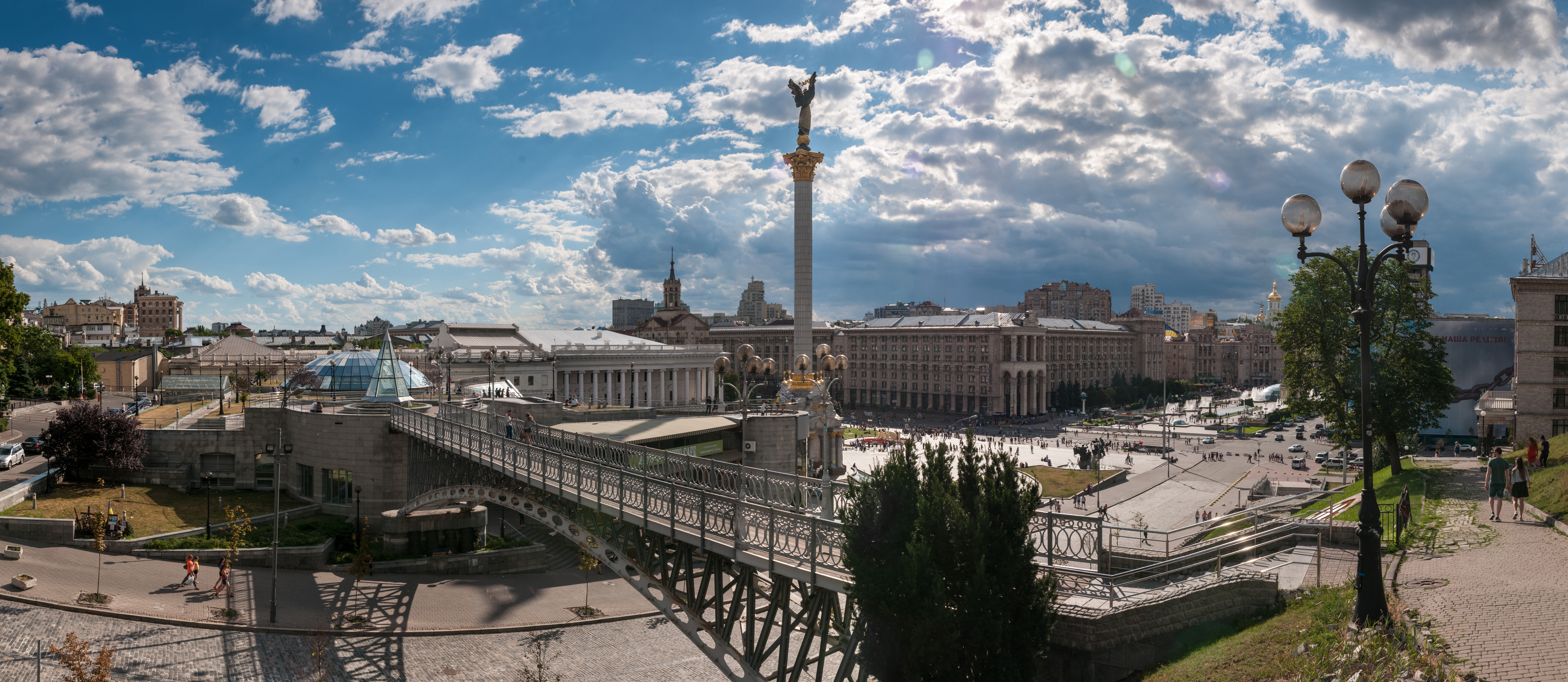
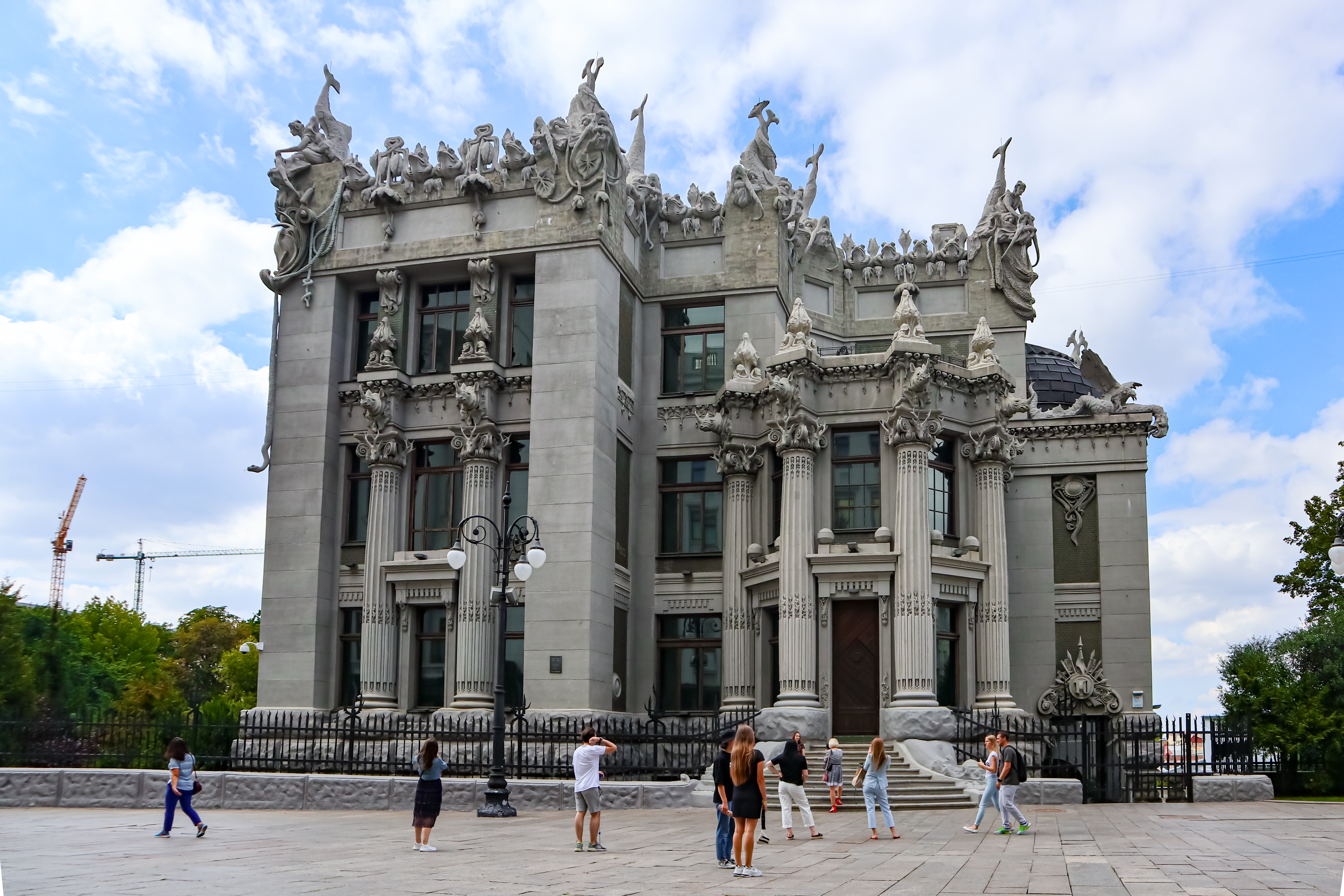
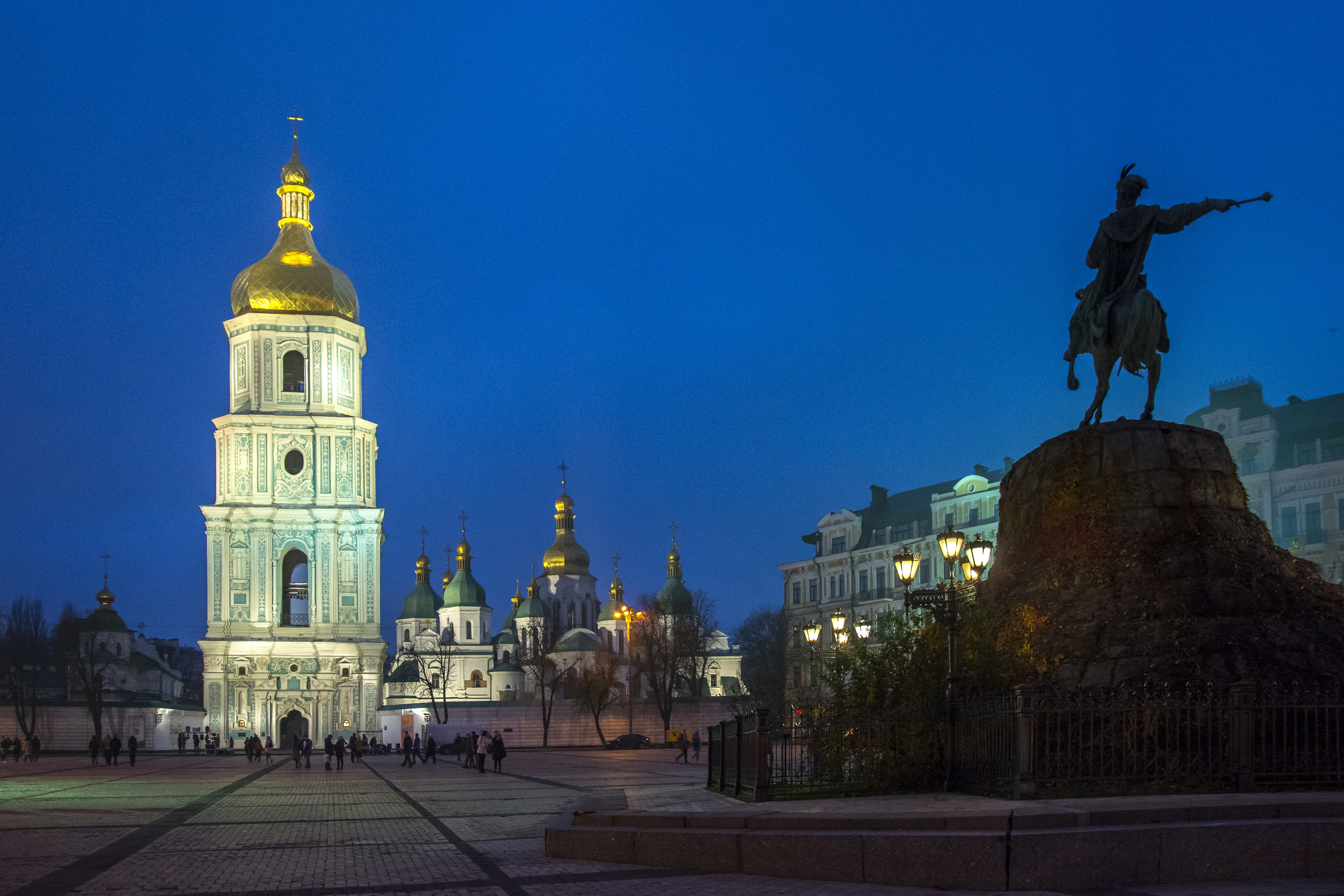
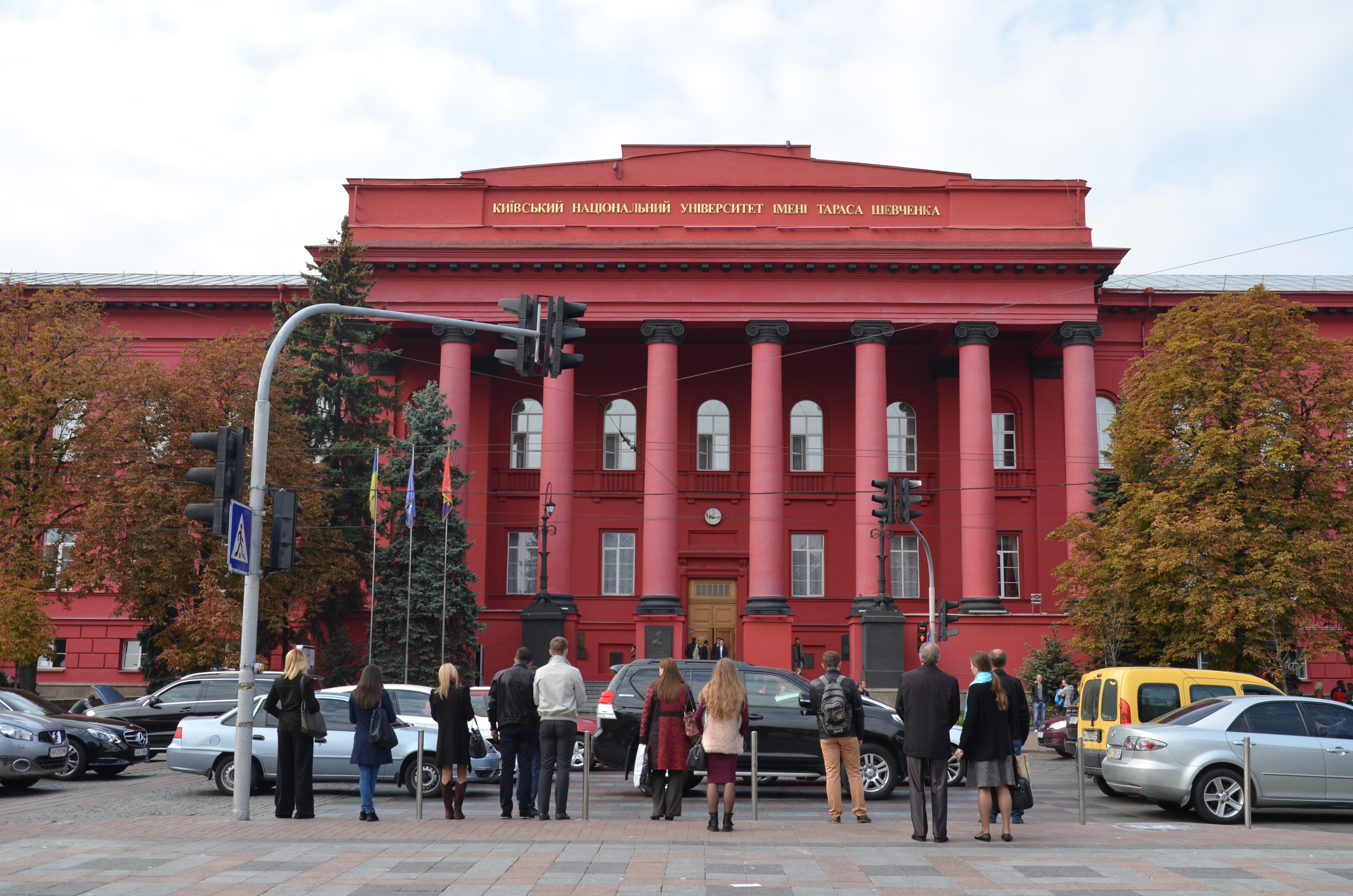
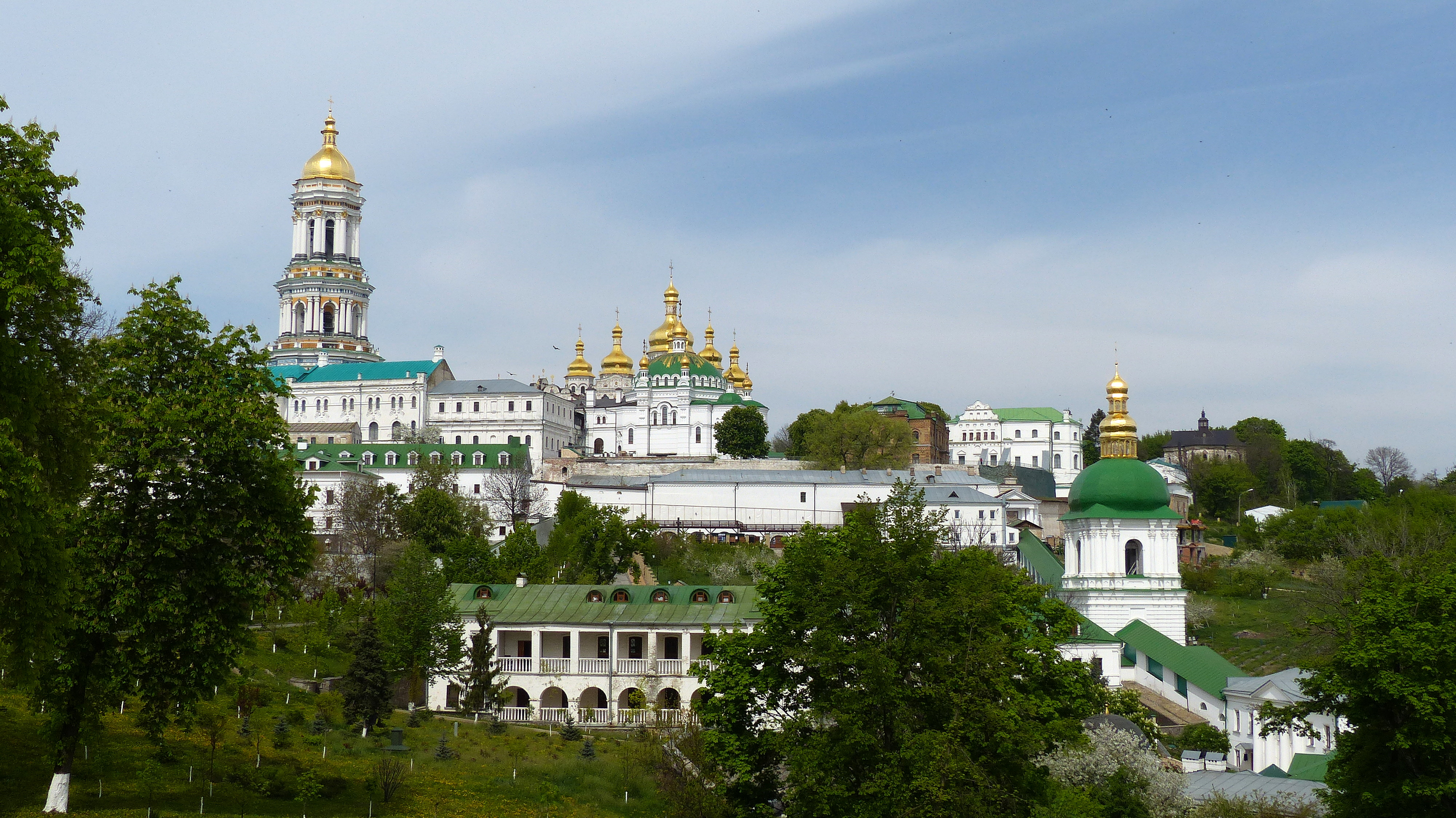
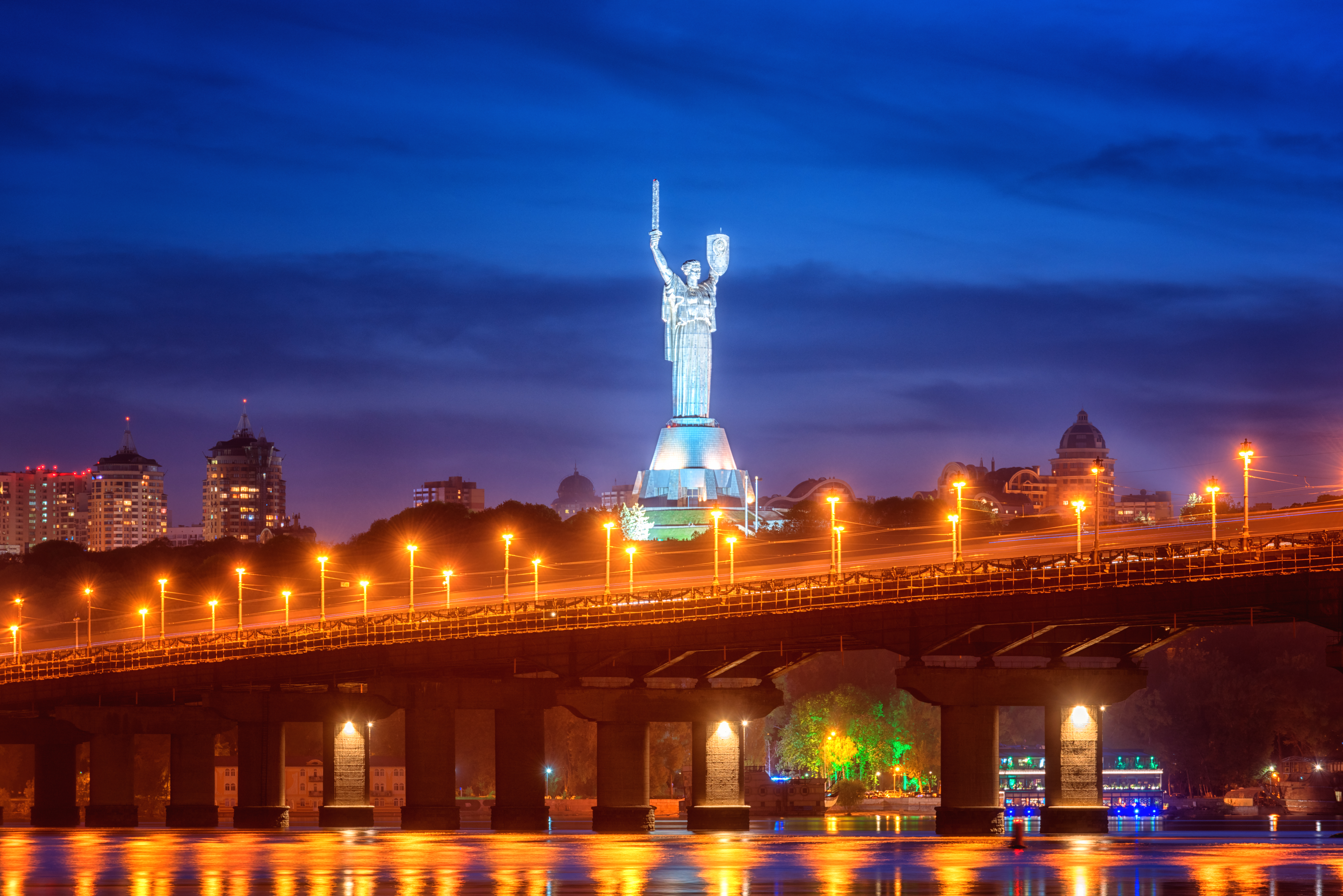
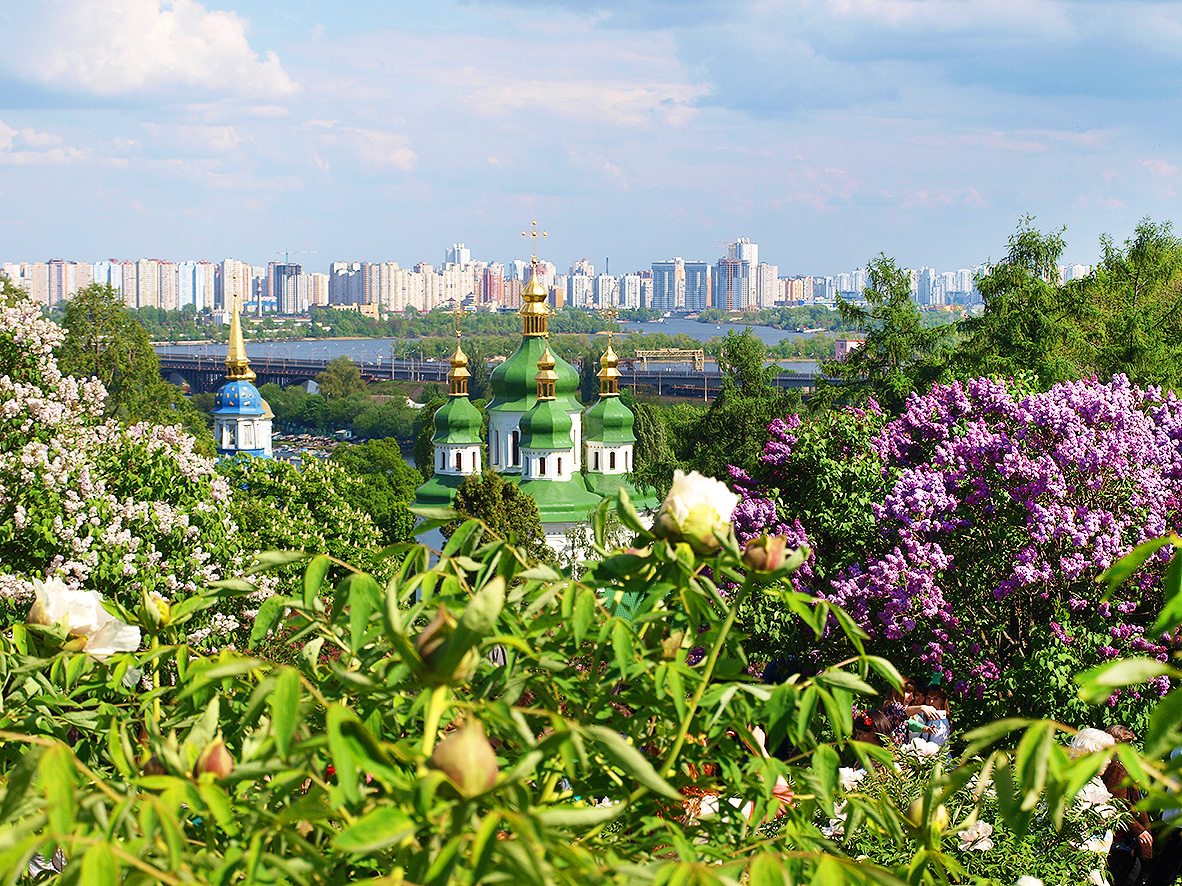
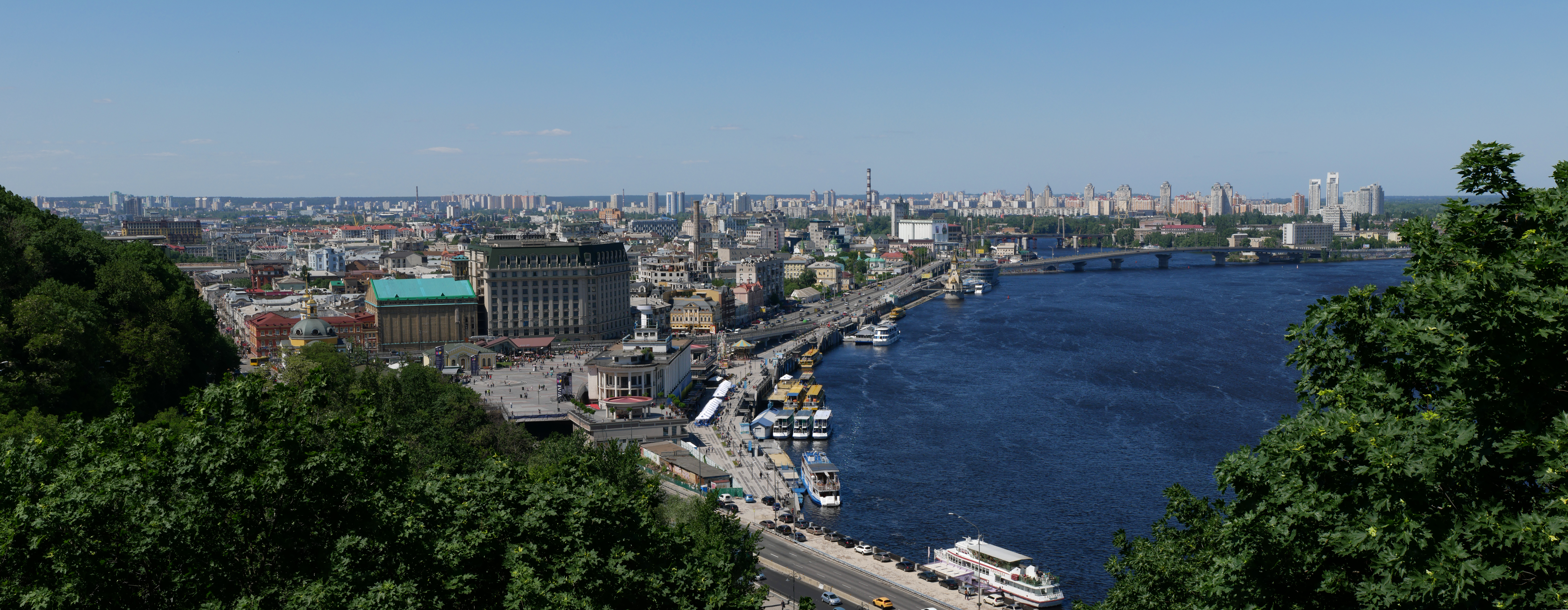
- Independence Square House with Chimaeras Sophia Square Red University Building Kyiv Pechersk Lavra Paton Bridge and Motherland Monument View of the Left Bank from Vydubychi Panorama of Podil district

- Flag Coat of arms Logo
- Anthem: "How Can I Not Love You, O Kyiv of Mine!"
- Interactive map of Kyiv
- Kyiv in Ukraine Kyiv (Europe)
- Coordinates: 50°27′00″N 30°31′24″E
- Country: Ukraine
- Municipality: Kyiv
- Founded: 482 CE (officially)
- City council: Kyiv City Council
- Districts: List of 10: Darnytskyi District; Desnianskyi District; Dniprovskyi District; Holosiivskyi District; Obolonskyi District; Pecherskyi District; Podilskyi District; Shevchenkivskyi District; Solomianskyi District; Sviatoshynskyi District

Government
  - Mayor and Head of City State Administration: Vitali Klitschko
  - Head of Kyiv City Military Administration: Andrii Tkachov (acting)

Area
  - Capital city and city with special status: 839 km^{2} (324 sq mi)

Population (1 January 2021)
  - Capital city and city with special status: ▼2,952,301
  - Rank: 1st in Ukraine; 7th in Europe
  - Density: 3,299/km^{2} (8,540/sq mi)
  - Metro: 3,475,000 of the Kyiv metropolitan area
- Demonym: Kyivan

GDP (nominal, 2021)
  - Capital city and city with special status: ₴1.276 trillion (US$31.1 billion)
  - Per capita: ₴431,616 (US$10,532)
- Time zone: UTC+02:00 (EET)
  - Summer (DST): UTC+03:00 (EEST)
- Postal code: 01xxx–04xxx
- Area code: +380 44
- ISO 3166 code: UA-30
- FIPS code: UP12
- NUTS statistical regions of Ukraine: UA63
- Website: kyivcity.gov.ua

Kyiv, also spelt Kiev, (Note: See § Name for alternative spellings and pronunciations.) is the capital and most populous city of Ukraine. Located in the north-central part of the country, it straddles both banks of the Dnieper River. As of January 2022, the population of Kyiv was 2,952,301, making it the seventh-most populous city in Europe. Kyiv is an important industrial, scientific, educational, and cultural center. It is home to high-tech industries, higher education institutions, and historical landmarks. The city has an extensive public transport system, which includes the Kyiv Metro.

The city's name is said to derive from the name of Kyi, one of its four legendary founders. One of the oldest cities in Eastern Europe, during its history, it has passed through several stages of prominence and obscurity. It probably existed as a commercial center as early as the 5th century. A Slavic settlement on the great trade route between Scandinavia and Constantinople, it was a tributary of the Khazars, until its capture by the Varangians (Vikings) in the mid-9th century. Under Varangian rule, the city became a capital of Kievan Rus', the first East Slavic state. During the Siege of Kiev (1240), Kyiv was left in ruins; it lost most of its influence for the centuries to come.

Kyiv grew into a centre of Eastern Orthodox learning during the 16th century. It prospered during the Russian Empire's Industrial Revolution in the late 19th century, becoming a centre of industry, commerce, and administration. In 1918, the Ukrainian People's Republic declared independence from the Russian Republic after the October Revolution, and Kyiv became the new republic's capital. Following the Ukrainian-Soviet and Polish-Soviet wars, Kyiv became part of the Ukrainian SSR, of which it became the capital in 1934. The city suffered significant destruction during World War II, but recovered after the war as the Soviet Union's third-largest city.

Following the collapse of the Soviet Union and Ukrainian independence in 1991, during the country's transformation into a market economy and electoral democracy, Kyiv has continued to be Ukraine's largest and wealthiest city. It has lost its dependence on the armaments industry, which has adversely affected the city's science and technology sectors, but the growth of the services and finance sectors has facilitated funding for the development of housing and urban infrastructure.

== Name ==
- English: Kyiv (/ˈkiː.ɪv/, KEE-iv, /kiːv/, KEEV) or Kiev (/ˈkiː.ɛv/, KEE-ev)
- Ukrainian: Київ, romanized: Kyiv, pronounced [ˈkɪjiu̯]
- Russian: Киев, romanized: Kiyev, (Note: pre-1918 spelling: Кіевъ) pronounced [ˈkʲi(j)ɪf]

The traditional etymology, stemming from the Primary Chronicle, is that the name is a derivation of Kyi (Ukrainian: Кий, Russian: Кий, (Note: pre-1918 spelling: Кій) rom.: Ky or Kiy), the legendary eponymous founder of the city. According to Oleg Trubachyov's etymological dictionary, the name derives from the Old East Slavic *Kyjevŭ gordŭ (literally, "Kyi's castle", "Kyi's gord"), from Proto-Slavic *kyjevъ. This etymology has been questioned, for instance by Mykhailo Hrushevsky, who called it an "etymological myth", and meant that the names of the legendary founders are in turn based on place names. According to the Ukrainian-Canadian linguist Jaroslav Rudnyckyj, the name can be connected to the Proto-Slavic root *kyjь, but should be interpreted as meaning "stick, pole" as in its modern Ukrainian equivalent кий. The name should in that case be interpreted as "palisaded settlement".

Kyiv is the official romanized Ukrainian name for the city, and it is used for legislative and official acts. Kiev is the traditional English name for the city, but because of its historical derivation from the Russian name, Kiev lost favor with many Western media outlets after the outbreak of the Russo-Ukrainian War in 2014 in conjunction with the KyivNotKiev campaign launched by Ukraine to change the way that international media were spelling the city's name.

== History ==
The first known humans in the region of Kyiv lived there in the late Paleolithic period (Stone Age). The population around Kyiv during the Bronze Age formed part of the so-called Trypillian culture, as evidenced by artifacts from that culture found in the area. During the early Iron Age certain tribes settled around Kyiv that practiced land cultivation, husbandry and trading with the Scythians and ancient states of the northern Black Sea coast. Findings of Roman coins of the 2nd to the 4th centuries suggest trade relations with the eastern provinces of the Roman Empire.

=== Origins ===
Scholars continue to debate when the city was founded. The traditional founding date is 482 CE, so the city celebrated its 1,500th anniversary in 1982. Archaeological data indicates a founding in the sixth or seventh centuries, with some researchers dating the founding as late as the late 9th century.

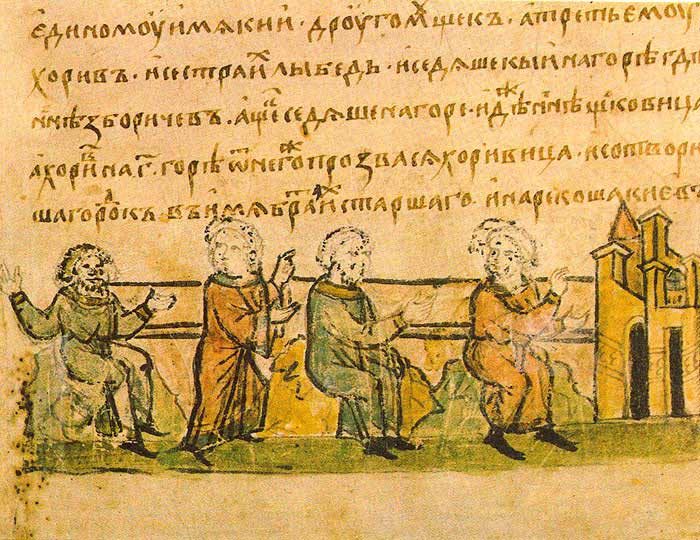
Legendary Kyi, Shchek, Khoryv and Lybid in the Radziwiłł Chronicle

There are several legendary accounts of the origin of the city. One tells of members of a Slavic tribe (Eastern Polans), brothers Kyi (the eldest, after whom the city was named), Shchek, Khoryv, and their sister Lybid, who founded the city (See the Primary Chronicle). Another legend states that Saint Andrew passed through the area in the 1st century. Where the city is now he erected a cross, where a church later was built. Since the Middle Ages an image of Saint Michael has represented the city as well as the duchy.

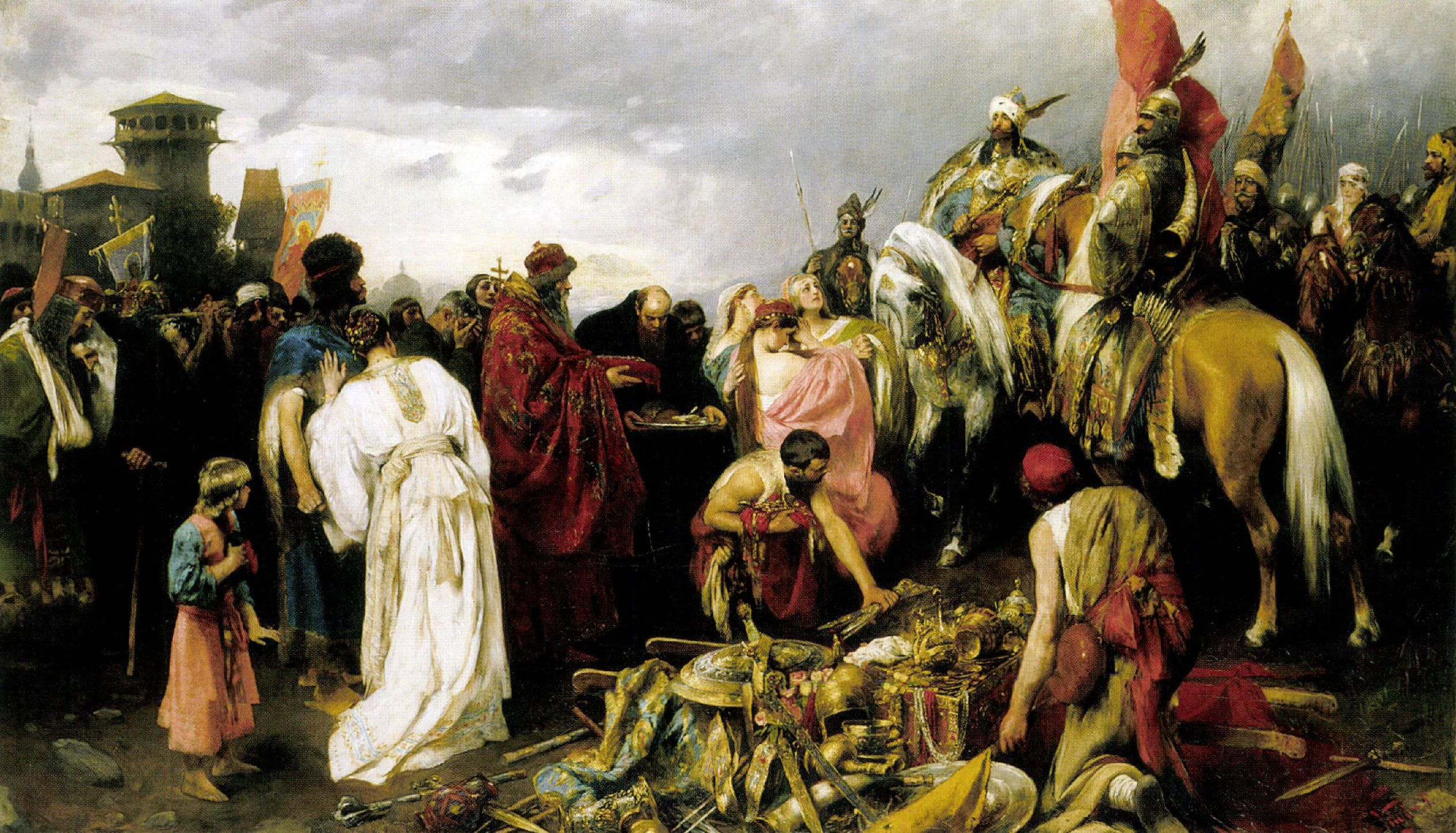
Hungarians at Kyiv in 830 during the times of the Rus' Khaganate; painting by Pál Vágó (1853–1928)

There is little historical evidence pertaining to the period when the city was founded. Scattered Slavic settlements existed in the area from the 6th century, but it is unclear whether any of them later developed into the city. On the Ptolemy world map there are several settlements indicated along the mid-stream of Borysthenes, among which is Azagarium, which some historians believe to be the predecessor to Kyiv.

However, according to the 1773 Dictionary of Ancient Geography of Alexander Macbean, that settlement corresponds to the modern city of Chernobyl. Just south of Azagarium, there is another settlement, Amadoca, believed to be the capital of the Amadoci people living in an area between the marshes of Amadoca in the west and the Amadoca mountains in the east.

Another name for Kyiv mentioned in history, the origin of which is not completely clear, is Sambat, which apparently has something to do with the Khazar Empire. The Primary Chronicle says the residents of Kyiv told Askold "there were three brothers Kyi, Shchek, and Khoriv. They founded this town and died, and now we are staying and paying taxes to their relatives the Khazars". In De Administrando Imperio, Constantine Porphyrogenitus mentions a caravan of small cargo boats which assembled annually, and writes, "They come down the river Dnieper and assemble at the strong-point of Kyiv (Kioava), also called Sambatas".

At least three Arabic-speaking 10th century geographers who traveled the area mention the city of Zānbat as the chief city of the Russes. Among them are ibn Rustah, Abu Sa'id Gardezi, and an author of the Hudud al-'Alam. The texts of those authors were discovered by Russian orientalist Alexander Tumansky. The etymology of Sambat has been argued by many historians, including Grigoriy Ilyinsky, Nikolay Karamzin, Jan Potocki, Nikolay Lambin, Joachim Lelewel, and Guðbrandur Vigfússon.

The Primary Chronicle states that at some point during the late 9th or early 10th century Askold and Dir, who may have been of Viking or Varangian descent, ruled in Kyiv. They were murdered by Oleg of Novgorod in 882, but some historians, such as Omeljan Pritsak and Constantine Zuckerman, dispute that, arguing that Khazar rule continued as late as the 920s, leaving historical documents such as the Kievan Letter and Schechter Letter.

Other historians suggest that Magyar tribes ruled the city between 840 and 878, before migrating with some Khazar tribes to the Carpathian Basin. The Primary Chronicle mentions Hungarians passing near Kyiv. Askold's Grave was previously known as "Uhorske urochyshche" (Hungarian place).

According to the aforementioned scholars the building of the fortress of Kyiv was finished in 840 under the leadership of Keő (Keve), Csák, and Geréb, three brothers, possibly members of the Tarján tribe. The three names appear in the Kyiv Chronicle as Kyi, Shchek, and Khoryv and may be not of Slavic origin, as Russian historians have always struggled to account for their meanings and origins. According to Hungarian historian Viktor Padányi, their names were inserted into the Kyiv Chronicle in the 12th century, and they were identified as old-Russian mythological heroes.

=== Kyivan Rus' ===
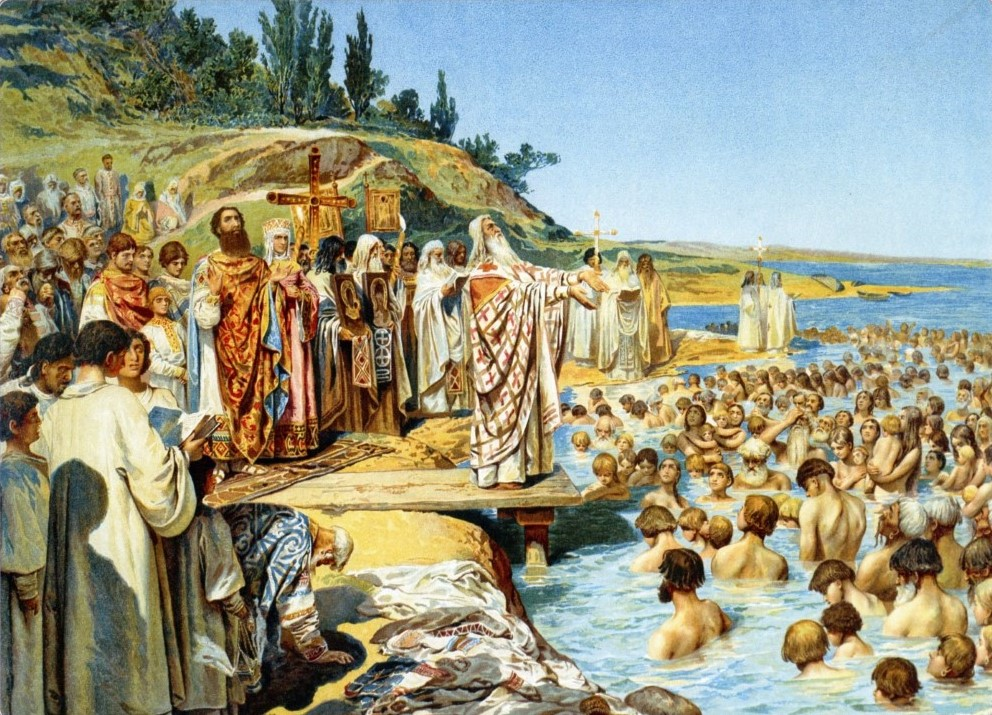
The Baptism of Kievans, a painting by Klavdiy Lebedev

The city of Kyiv stood on the trade route between the Varangians and the Greeks. In 968 the nomadic Pechenegs attacked and then besieged the city. By 1000 CE the city had a population of 45,000. According to Thietmar of Merseburg, who described Kyiv in his chronicle from 1017, during that time the city had over 400 churches and 8 markets. Its significance as the capital of Rus' was underlined by large-scale construction projects, such as the erection of St. Sophia Cathedral by Yaroslav the Wise.

During the period of feudal divisions in Rus', Kyiv retained its special meaning and became an object of numerous campaigns by various princes. Between 1146 and 1246 the city changed hands 47 times, being ruled by 24 princes, and in 35 cases their tenure lasted less than a year. In March 1169, Grand Prince Andrey Bogolyubsky of Vladimir-Suzdal sacked Kyiv, leaving the old town and the prince's hall in ruins. He took many pieces of religious artwork – including the Theotokos of Vladimir icon – from Vyshhorod. In 1203, Prince Rurik Rostislavich and his Kipchak allies captured and burned Kyiv. In the 1230s, the city was besieged and ravaged several times by different Rus princes. The city had not recovered from these attacks when, in 1240, the Mongol invasion of Rus', led by Batu Khan, completed the destruction of Kyiv.

=== Golden Horde period ===
The Mongol conquest had a profound effect on the future of the city and on the culture of Kyivan Rus'. Kyiv had had a reputation as one of the largest cities in the world, with a population of about 35,000–40,000 inhabitants "before the Mongol invasion" (according to Orest Subtelny), or 36,000–50,000 "at the end of the twelfth century" (according to Janet L. B. Martin). Deprived of its own dynasty, under the Golden Horde Kyiv was ruled according to yarlyks issued by Mongol rulers, but its princes only nominally controlled the city, barely appearing there.

In the early 1320s, a Lithuanian army led by Grand Duke Gediminas defeated a Slavic army led by Stanislav of Kyiv at the Battle on the Irpen' River and conquered the city. The Tatars, who also claimed Kyiv, retaliated in 1324–1325, so while Kyiv was ruled by a Lithuanian prince, it had to pay tribute to the Golden Horde. Finally, as a result of the Battle of Blue Waters in 1362, Algirdas, Grand Duke of Lithuania, incorporated Kyiv and surrounding areas into the Grand Duchy of Lithuania.

=== Lithuanian and Polish period ===
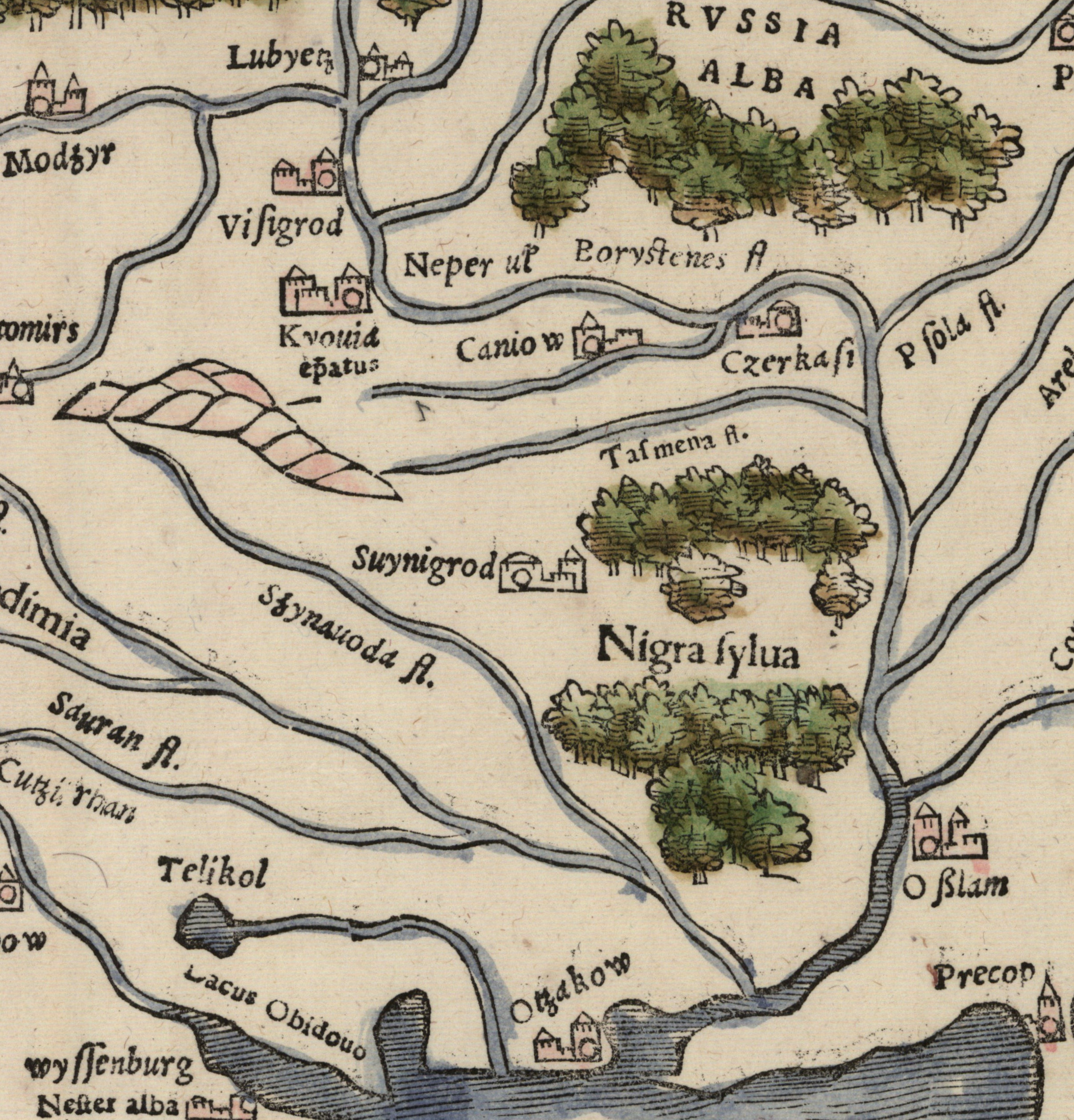
Detail of Sebastian Münster's Map of Poland and Hungary, 1552, showing Kyiv labelled "Kyouia episcopatus" ("Kyiv episcopate")

At the time of the Lithuanian rule, the core of the city was located in Podil and there was a Lithuanian Kyiv Castle with 18 towers on the Zamkova Hora which served as a residence of Vladimir Olgerdovich, Grand Prince of Kyiv, and subsequently of the Grand Dukes of Lithuania (e.g. Vytautas).

In 1482, Crimean Tatars sacked and burned much of Kyiv.

With the 1569 Union of Lublin, when the Polish–Lithuanian Commonwealth was established, the Lithuanian-controlled lands of the Kyiv region (Podolia, Volhynia, and Podlachia) were transferred from the Grand Duchy of Lithuania to the Crown of the Kingdom of Poland, and Kyiv became the capital of Kyiv Voivodeship. The 1658 Treaty of Hadiach envisaged Kyiv becoming the capital of the Grand Duchy of Rus' within the Polish–Lithuanian–Ruthenian Commonwealth, but this provision of the treaty never went into operation.

During the early 17th century, the Kyiv Monastery of the Caves, founded by Anthony of Kiev in the 11th century, became a centre of an Orthodox cultural revival, leading to the foundation of a brotherhood school, later known as Mohyla Collegium. During that period administration of Cossack hetman Petro Konashevych-Sahaidachnyi was moved to Kyiv, once again making it a political centre of Ukrainian lands.

=== Cossack period and Russian suzerainty ===
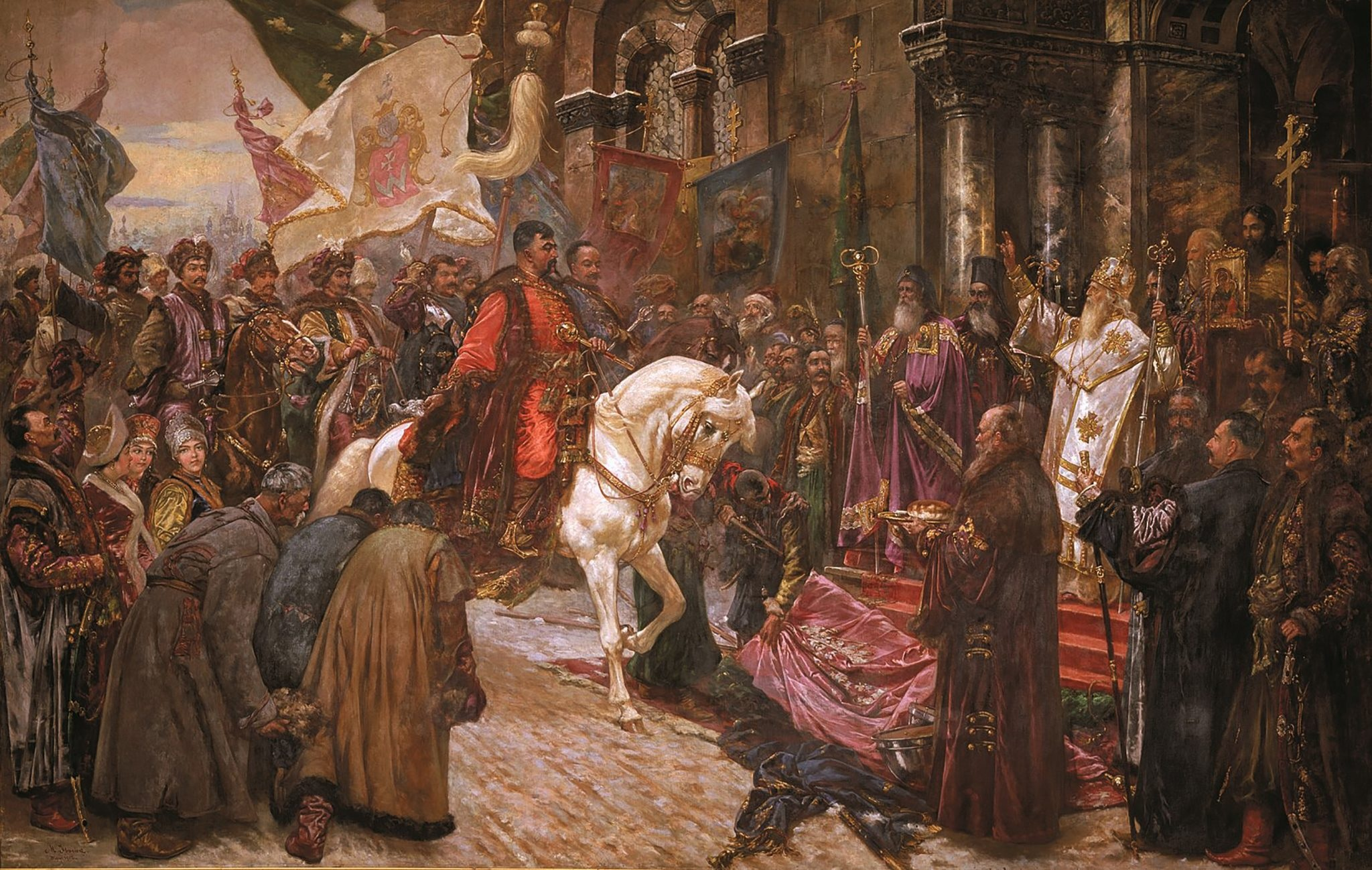
The Entrance of Bohdan Khmelnytsky to Kyiv in 1649 by Mykola Ivasyuk (1865–1937) depicts events after the Khmelnytsky Uprising against Polish domination.

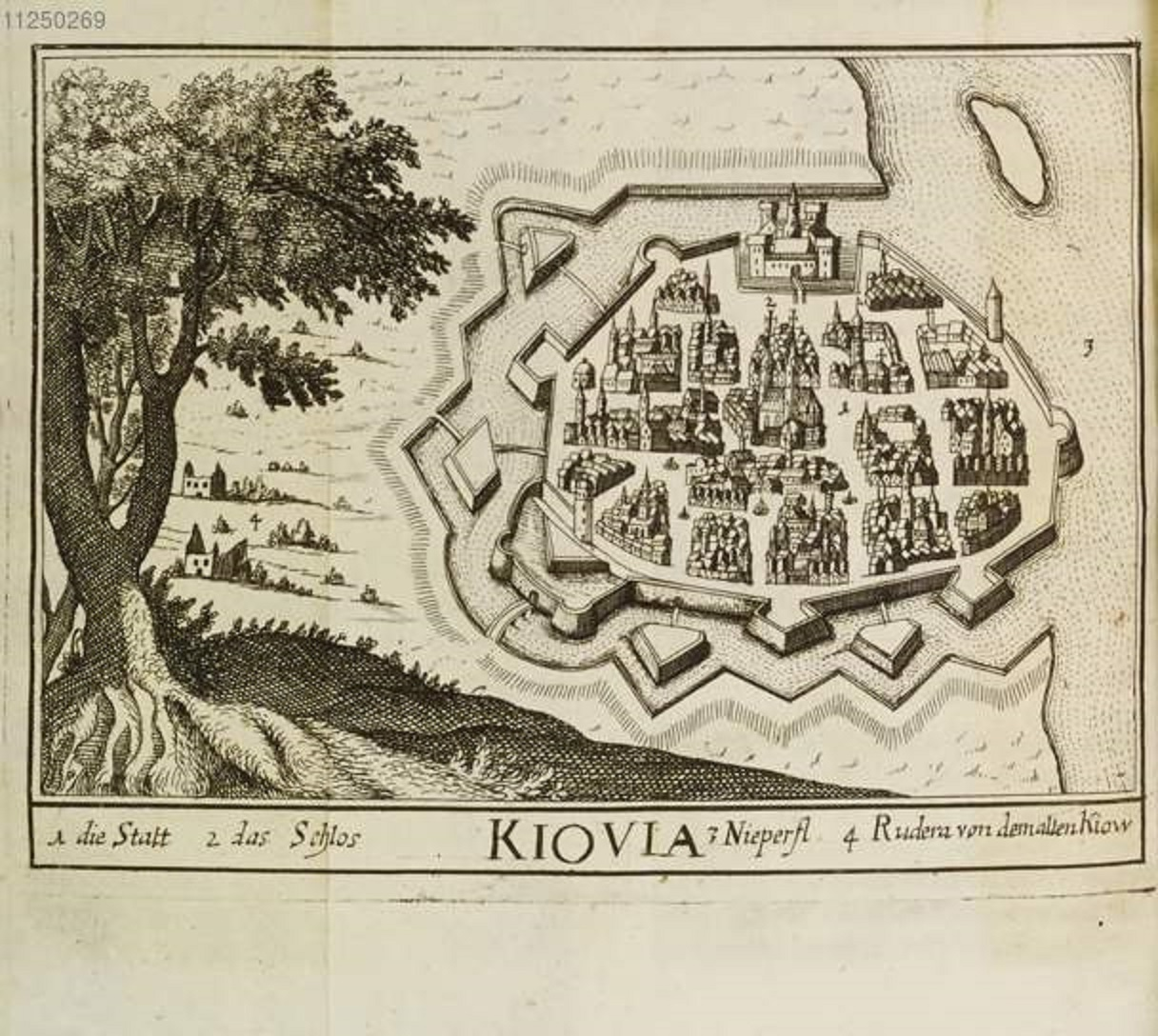
The 1686 city map of Kyiv ("Kiovia"), fortified Podil with the "alten" city shown in ruins ("Rudera")

In 1649, following the success of the Khmelnytsky Uprising, the victorious Cossack army of Bohdan Khmelnytsky entered Kyiv. Local clergy supported the rebellion and provided its ideological foundations, encouraging Khmelnytsky to depict himself as a protector of the Orthodox faith and defender of the Ruthenian people. Occupied by Russian troops since the 1654 Treaty of Pereyaslav, Kyiv became a part of the Tsardom of Russia from 1667 with the Truce of Andrusovo and enjoyed self-government inside an autonomous Cossack Hetmanate. None of the Polish–Russian treaties concerning Kyiv have ever been ratified.

In the Russian Empire, Kyiv was a primary Christian centre, attracting pilgrims, and the cradle of many of the empire's most important religious figures, but until the 19th century, the city's commercial importance remained marginal. In 1834, the Russian government established Saint Vladimir University, now known as the Taras Shevchenko National University of Kyiv in honour of Ukrainian poet Taras Shevchenko (1814–1861), who worked as a field researcher and editor for its geography department. The medical faculty of Saint Vladimir University, separated into an independent institution in 1919–1921 during the Soviet period, became the Bogomolets National Medical University in 1995.

During the 18th and 19th centuries, the Imperial Russian Army and ecclesiastical authorities dominated city life; the Russian Orthodox Church had involvement in a significant part of Kyiv's infrastructure and commercial activity. In the late 1840s the historian Mykola Kostomarov (Russian: Nikolai Kostomarov) founded a secret political society, the Brotherhood of Saints Cyril and Methodius, whose members put forward the idea of a federation of free Slavic peoples with Ukrainians as a distinct and separate group rather than a subordinate part of the Russian nation; the Russian authorities quickly suppressed the society.

Following the gradual loss of Ukraine's autonomy, Kyiv experienced growing Russification in the 19th century, by means of Russian migration, administrative actions, and social modernization. At the beginning of the 20th century the Russian-speaking part of the population dominated the city centre, while the lower classes living on the outskirts retained Ukrainian folk culture to a significant extent. However, enthusiasts among ethnic Ukrainian aristocrats, soldiers, and merchants made attempts to preserve the native culture in Kyiv, by clandestine book-printing, amateur theatre, folk studies, etc.

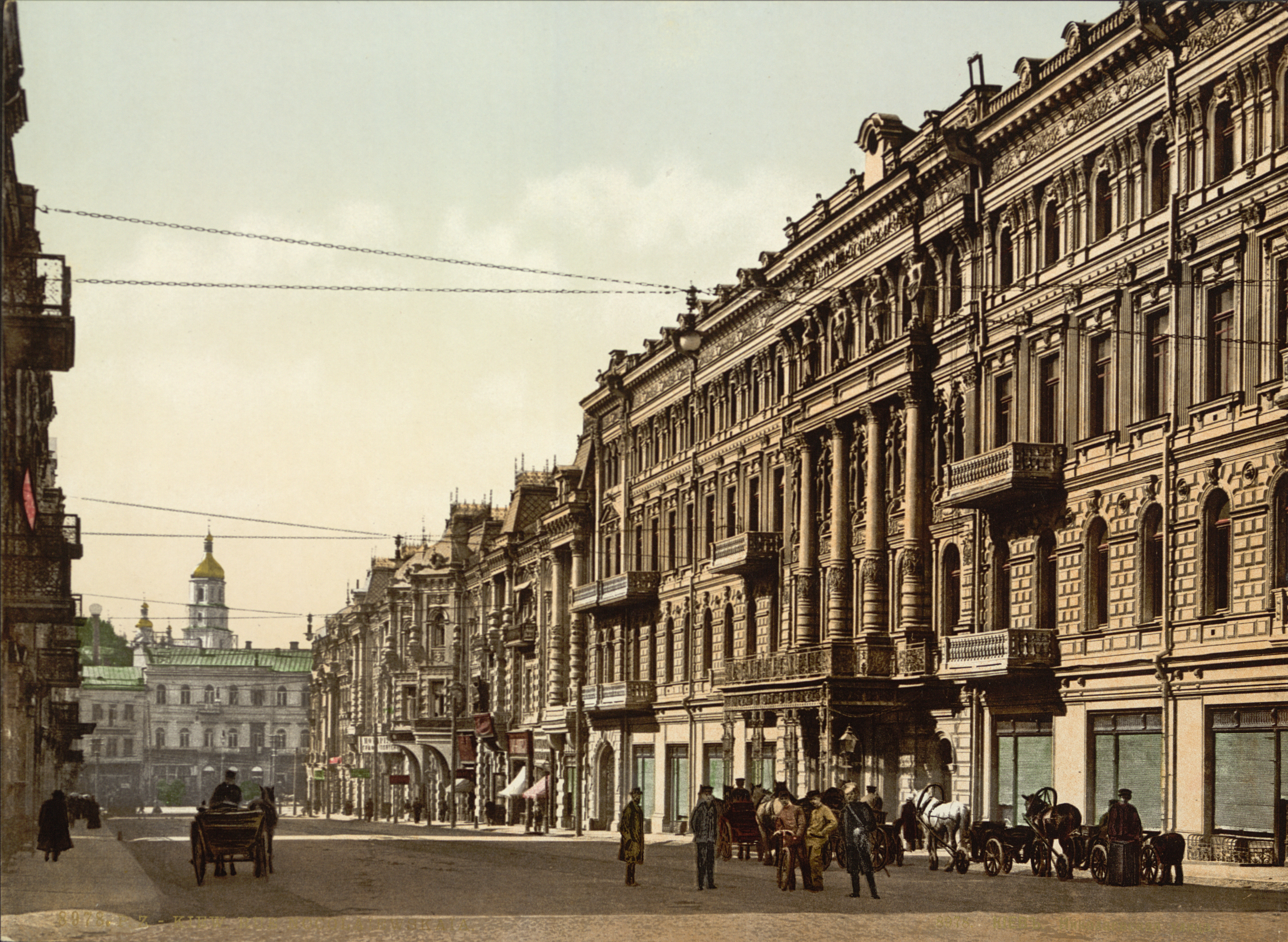
Kyiv in the late 19th century

During the Russian industrial revolution in the late 19th century, Kyiv became an important trade and transportation centre of the Russian Empire, specialising in sugar and grain export by railway and on the Dnieper river. By 1900, the city had also become a significant industrial centre, with a population of 250,000. Landmarks of that period include the railway infrastructure, the foundation of numerous educational and cultural facilities, and notable architectural monuments (mostly merchant-oriented). In 1892, the first electric tram line of the Russian Empire started running in Kyiv (the third in the world). Kyiv prospered during the late 19th century Industrial Revolution in the Russian Empire, when it became the third most important city of the Empire and the major centre of commerce in its southwest.

=== Soviet era ===
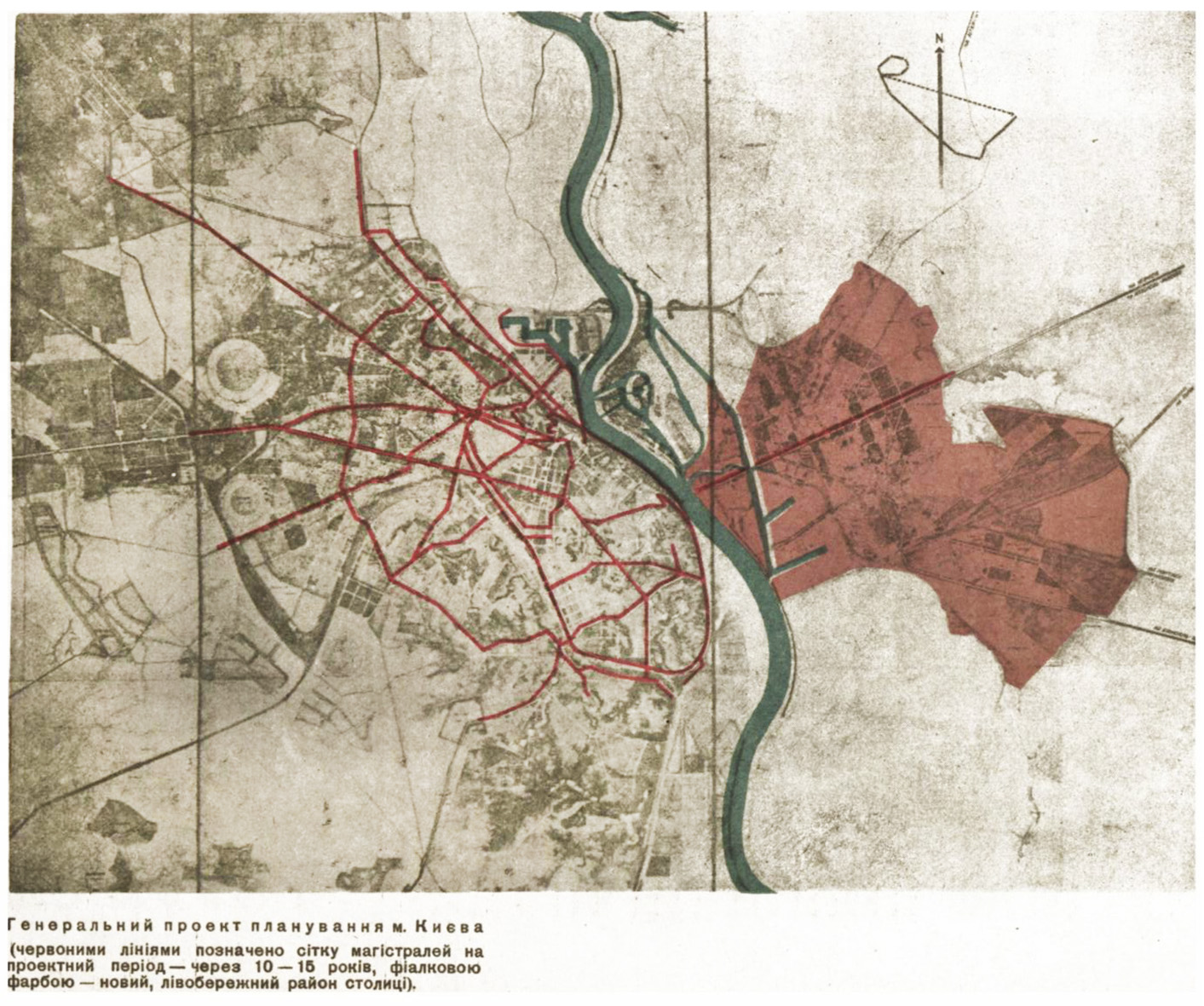
Until 1936, Kyiv was located mostly on the west bank of the Dnieper, while across the river was located the town of Darnytsia, today a main component of the Left Bank of Kyiv.

In the turbulent period following the 1917 Russian Revolution, Kyiv became the capital of several successive Ukrainian states and was caught in the middle of several conflicts: World War I, during which German soldiers occupied it from 2 March 1918 to November 1918, the Russian Civil War of 1917 to 1922, and the Polish–Soviet War of 1919–1921. During the last three months of 1919, Kyiv was intermittently controlled by the White Army. Kyiv changed hands sixteen times from the end of 1918 to August 1920.

From 1921 to 1991, the city formed part of the Ukrainian Soviet Socialist Republic, which became a founding republic of the Soviet Union in 1922. The major events that took place in Soviet Ukraine during the interwar period all affected Kyiv: the 1920s Ukrainization as well as the migration of the rural Ukrainophone population made the Russophone city Ukrainian-speaking and bolstered the development of Ukrainian cultural life in the city; the Soviet industrialization that started in the late 1920s turned the city, a former centre of commerce and religion, into a major industrial, technological and scientific centre; the 1932–1933 Great Famine devastated the part of the migrant population not registered for ration cards; and Joseph Stalin's Great Purge of 1937–1938 almost eliminated the city's intelligentsia.

In 1934, Kyiv became the capital of Soviet Ukraine. The city boomed again during the years of Soviet industrialization as its population grew rapidly and many industrial giants were established, some of which exist today.

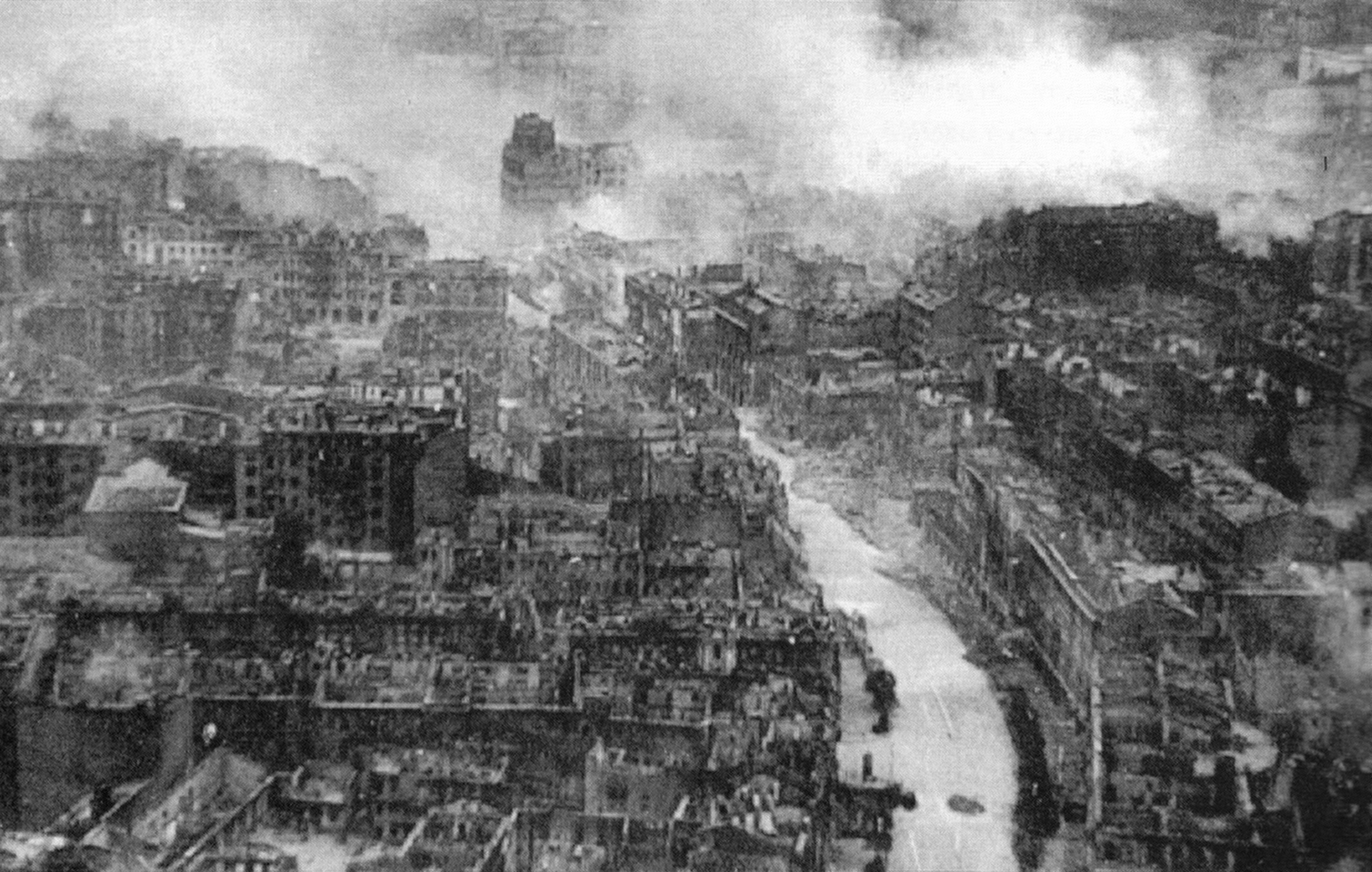
Ruins of Kyiv during World War II

In World War II, the city again suffered significant damage, and Nazi Germany occupied it from 19 September 1941 to 6 November 1943. Axis forces killed or captured more than 600,000 Soviet soldiers in the great encircling Battle of Kyiv in 1941. Most of those captured never returned alive. Shortly after the Wehrmacht occupied the city, a team of NKVD officers who had remained hidden dynamited most of the buildings on the Khreshchatyk, the main street of the city, where German military and civil authorities had occupied most of the buildings; the buildings burned for days and 25,000 people were left homeless.

Allegedly in response to the actions of the NKVD, the Germans rounded up all the local Jews they could find, nearly 34,000, and massacred them at Babi Yar in Kyiv on 29 and 30 September 1941. In the months that followed, thousands more were taken to Babi Yar where they were shot. It is estimated that the Germans murdered more than 100,000 people of various ethnic groups, mostly civilians, at Babi Yar during World War II.

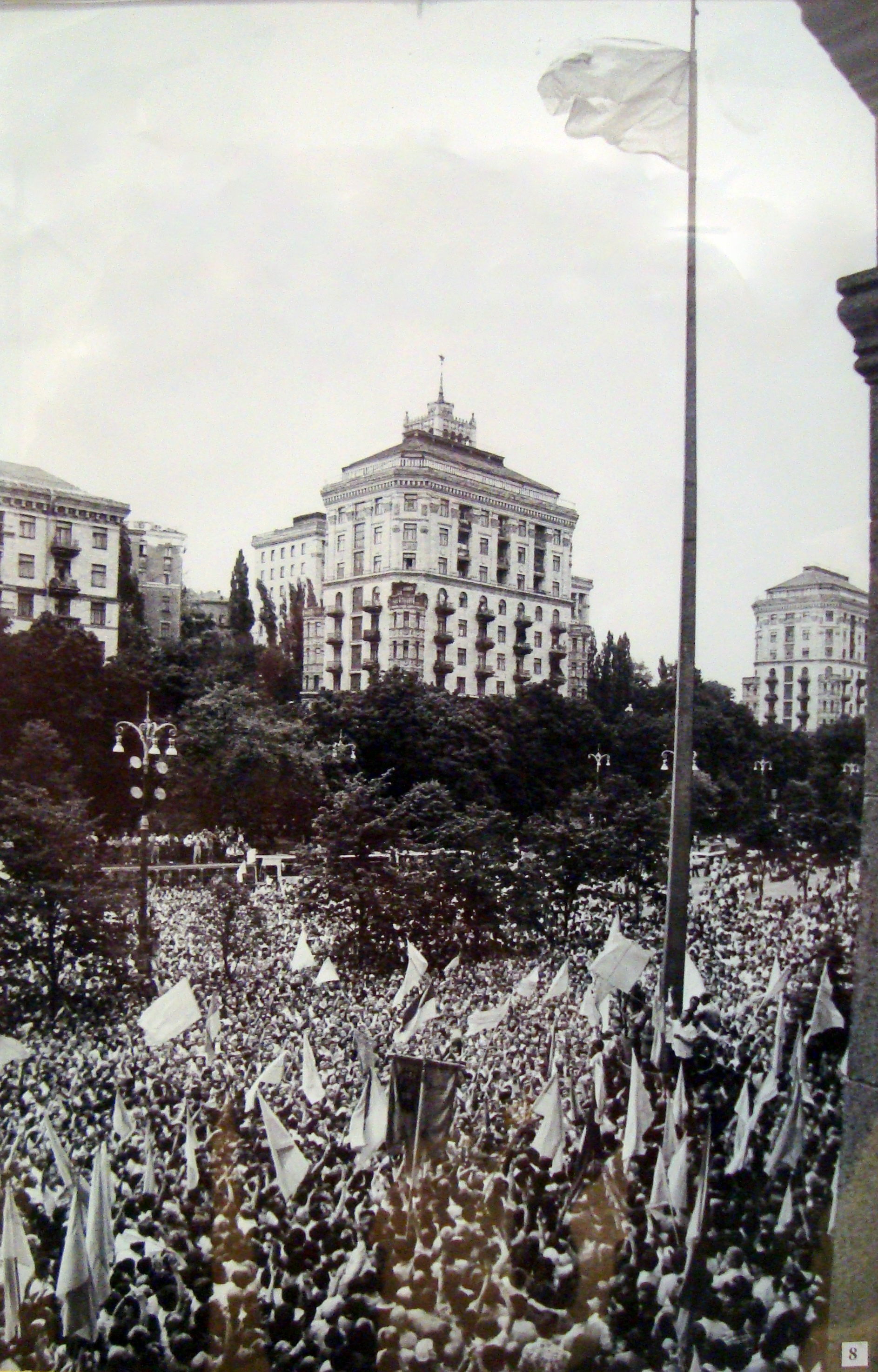
The Ukrainian national flag was raised outside Kyiv's City Hall for the first time on 24 July 1990.

Kyiv recovered economically in the post-war years, becoming once again the third-most important city of the Soviet Union. The catastrophic accident at the Chernobyl Nuclear Power Plant in 1986 occurred only 100 km (62 mi) north of the city. However, the prevailing south wind blew most of the radioactive debris away from Kyiv.

=== Independence ===
In the course of the collapse of the Soviet Union the Ukrainian parliament proclaimed the Declaration of Independence of Ukraine in the city on 24 August 1991. In 2004–2005, the city played host to the largest post-Soviet public demonstrations up to that time, in support of the Orange Revolution. From November 2013 until February 2014, central Kyiv became the primary location of Euromaidan. During the onset of the Russian invasion of Ukraine in February 2022, Russian forces attempted to seize Kyiv but were repelled by Ukrainian forces on the outskirts of the city; Kyiv itself escaped major damage. Following the Russian retreat from the region in April 2022, Kyiv has been subject to frequent air strikes.

== Environment ==
=== Geography ===
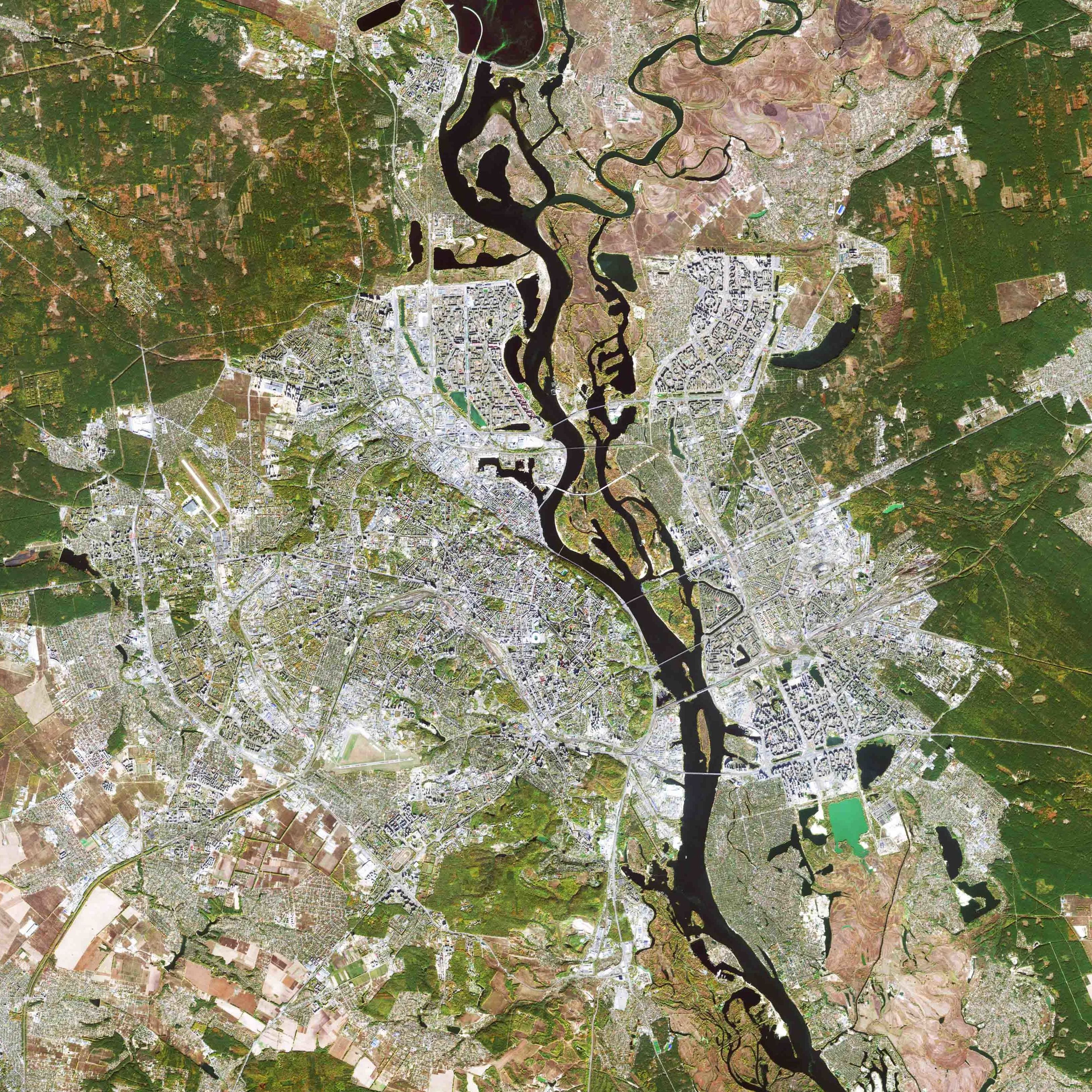
A Copernicus Programme Sentinel-2 image of Kyiv and the Dnieper

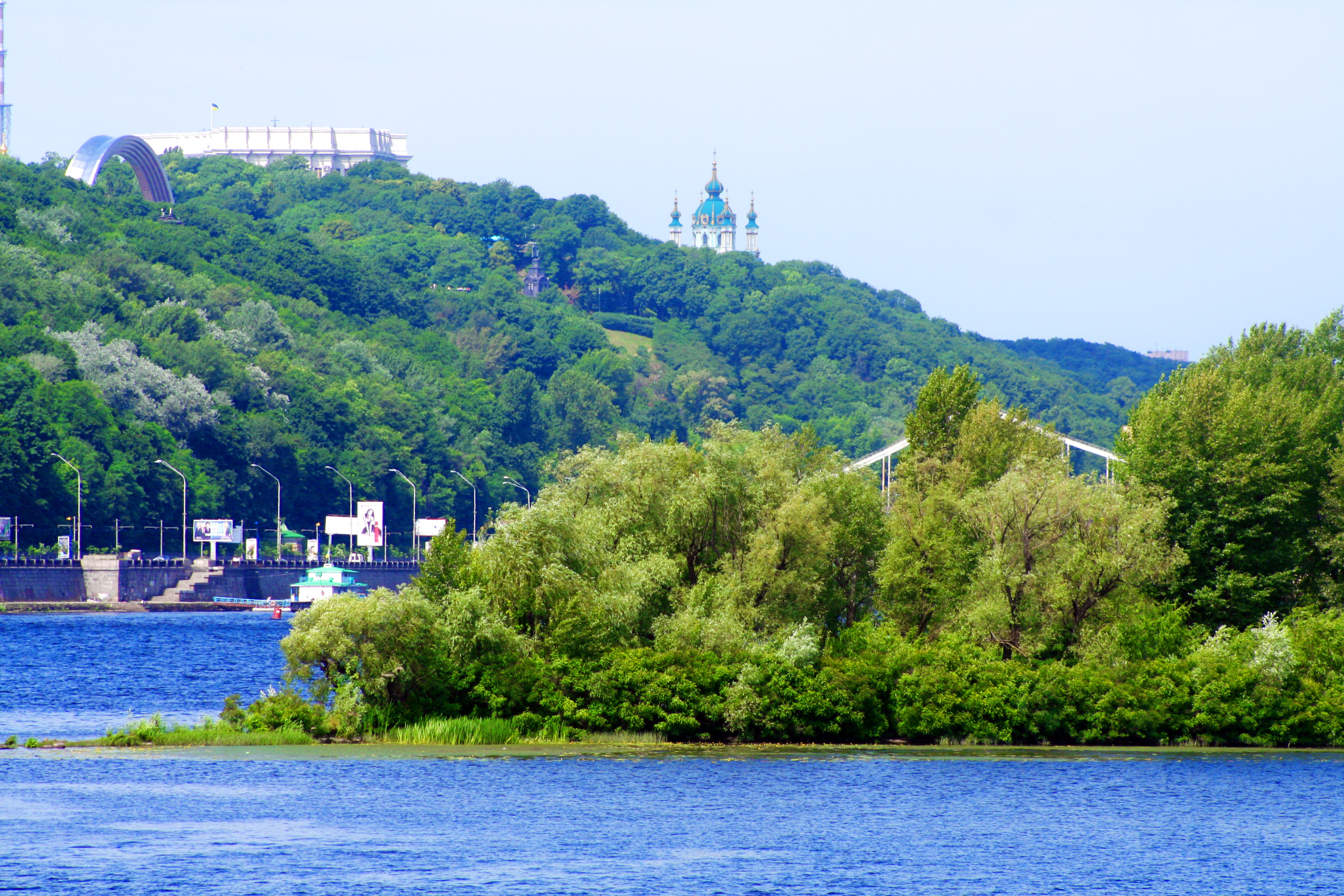
View from the Hydropark in Kyiv, with Arch of Freedom and St. Andrew's Church visible on the opposite bank

Geographically, Kyiv is on the border of the Polesia woodland ecological zone, a part of the European mixed woods area, and the East European forest steppe biome. However, the city's unique landscape distinguishes it from the surrounding region. Kyiv is completely surrounded by Kyiv Oblast.

Originally on the west bank, today Kyiv is on both sides of the Dnieper, which flows southwards through the city towards the Black Sea. The older and higher western part of the city sits on numerous wooded hills (Kyiv Hills), with ravines and small rivers. Kyiv's geographical relief contributed to its toponyms, such as Podil ("lower"), Pechersk ("caves"), and uzviz (a steep street, "descent"). The historical core of Kyiv is a part of the larger Dnieper Upland adjoining the western bank of the Dnieper in its mid-flow, which contributes to the city's elevation change.

The northern outskirts of the city border the Polesian Lowland. Kyiv expanded into the Dnieper Lowland on the left bank (to the east) as late as the 20th century. The whole portion of Kyiv on the left bank of the Dnieper is generally referred to as the Left Bank (Лівий берег, Livyi bereh). Significant areas of the left bank Dnieper valley were artificially sand-deposited, and are protected by dams.

Within the city the Dnieper River forms a branching system of tributaries, isles, and harbors within the city limits. The city is close to the mouth of the Desna River and the Kyiv Reservoir in the north, and the Kaniv Reservoir in the south. Both the Dnieper and Desna rivers are navigable at Kyiv, although regulated by the reservoir shipping locks and limited by winter freeze-over.

In total, there are 448 bodies of open water within the boundaries of Kyiv, which include the Dnieper itself, its reservoirs, and several small rivers, dozens of lakes and artificially created ponds. They occupy 7949 hectares. Additionally, the city has 16 developed beaches (totalling 140 hectares) and 35 near-water recreational areas (covering more than 1,000 hectares). Many are used for pleasure and recreation, although some of the bodies of water are not suitable for swimming.

According to the UN 2011 evaluation, there were no risks of natural disasters in Kyiv and its metropolitan area.

=== Climate ===
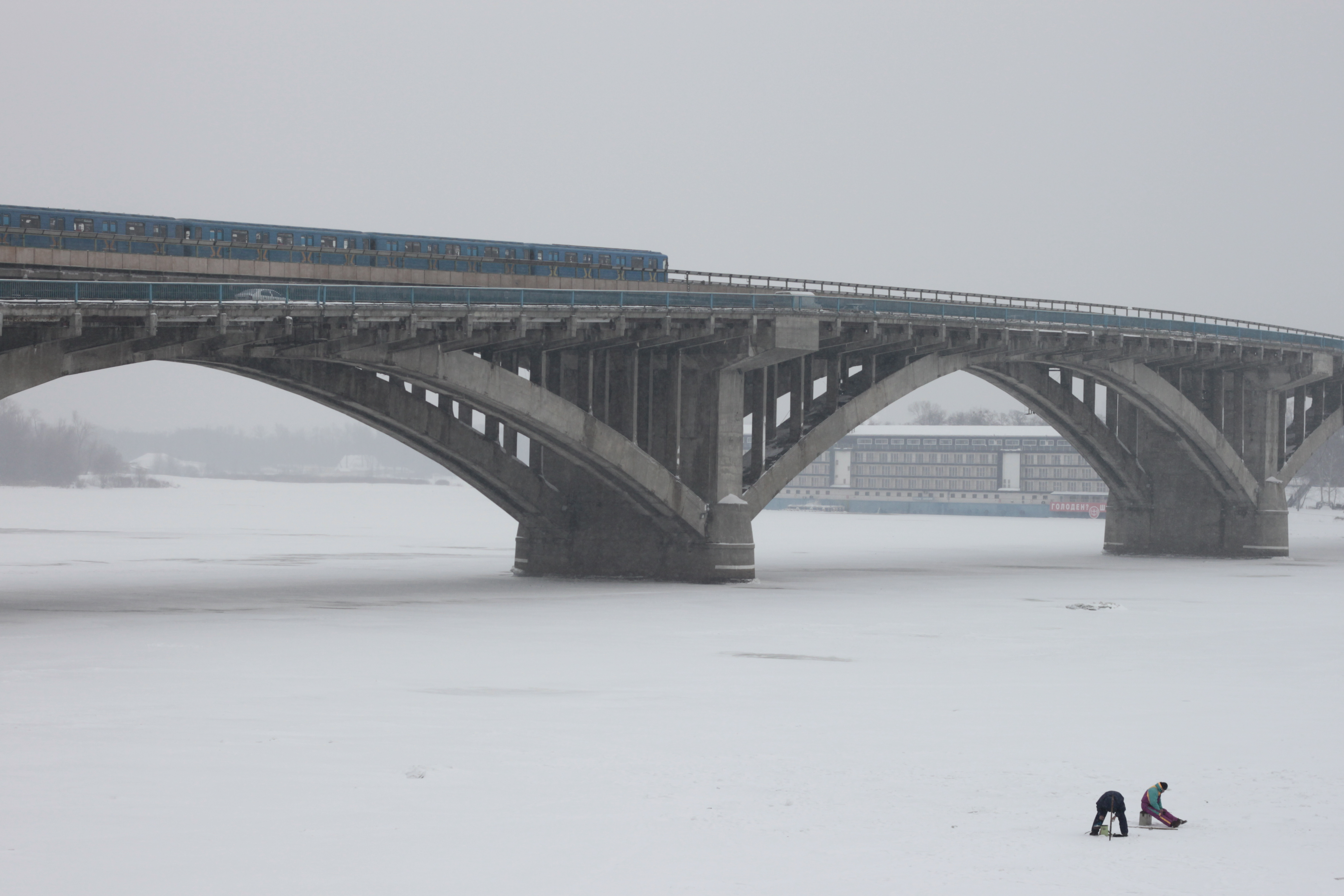
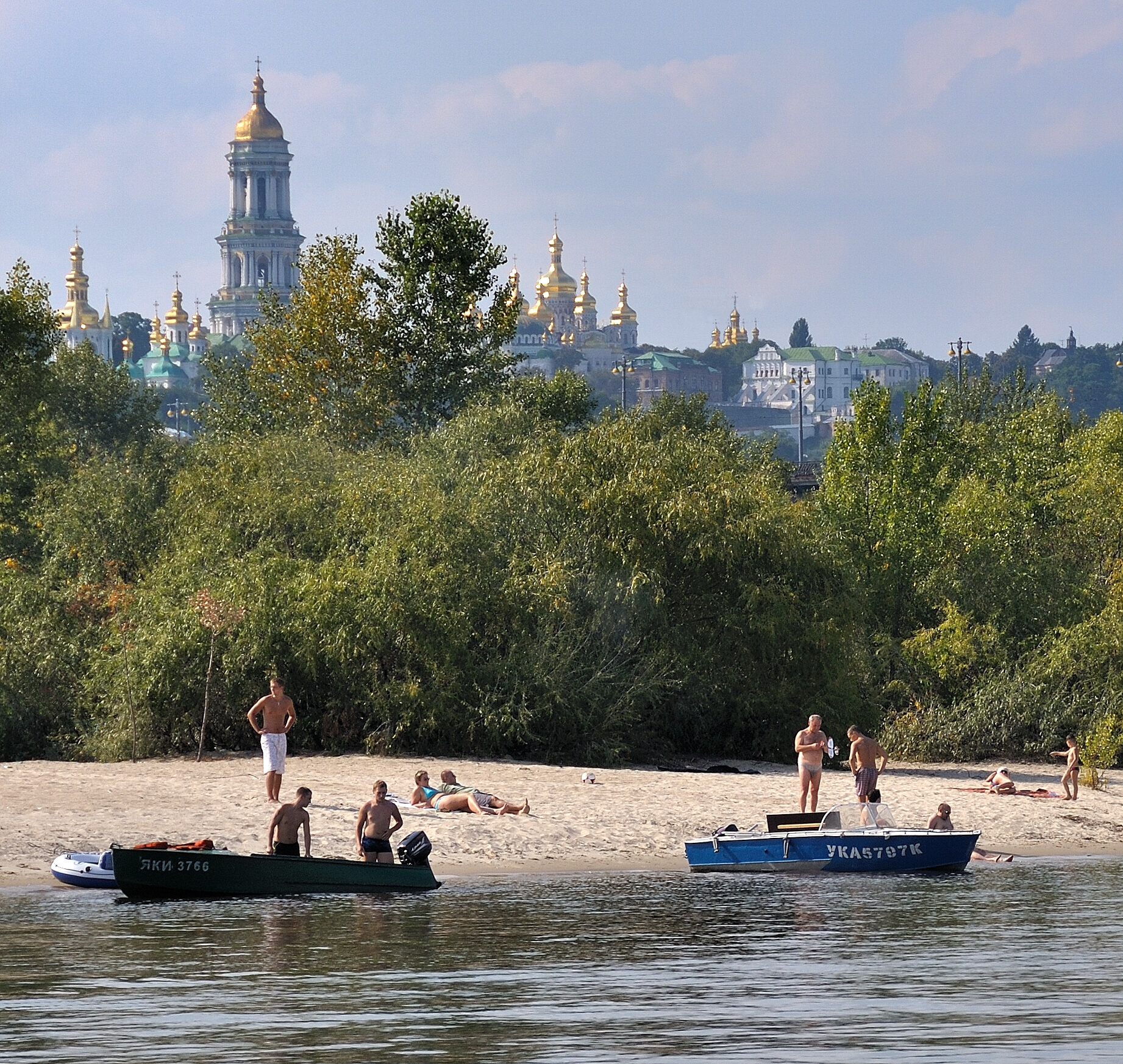
Ice fishing on the Dnipro river in winter; people sunbathing on a nearby beach during summer.

Kyiv has a warm-summer humid continental climate (Köppen Dfb). The warmest months are June, July, and August, with mean temperatures of 13.8 to 24.8 °C (56.8 to 76.6 °F). The coldest are December, January, and February, with mean temperatures of −4.6 to −1.1 °C (23.7 to 30.0 °F). The highest ever temperature recorded in the city was 39.4 °C (102.9 °F) on 30 July 1936.

The coldest temperature ever recorded in the city was −32.9 °C (−27.2 °F) on 11 January 1951. Snow cover usually lies from mid-November to the end of March, with the frost-free period lasting 180 days on average, but surpassing 200 days in some years.

Climate data for Kyiv (1991–2020, extremes 1881–present)
| Month | Jan | Feb | Mar | Apr | May | Jun | Jul | Aug | Sep | Oct | Nov | Dec | Year |
|---|---|---|---|---|---|---|---|---|---|---|---|---|---|
| Record high °C (°F) | 13.2 (55.8) | 17.3 (63.1) | 25.3 (77.5) | 30.2 (86.4) | 33.6 (92.5) | 35.5 (95.9) | 39.4 (102.9) | 39.3 (102.7) | 35.7 (96.3) | 27.9 (82.2) | 23.2 (73.8) | 15.2 (59.4) | 39.4 (102.9) |
| Mean daily maximum °C (°F) | −0.8 (30.6) | 0.7 (33.3) | 6.5 (43.7) | 15.0 (59.0) | 21.1 (70.0) | 24.6 (76.3) | 26.5 (79.7) | 25.9 (78.6) | 20.0 (68.0) | 12.9 (55.2) | 5.3 (41.5) | 0.5 (32.9) | 13.2 (55.8) |
| Daily mean °C (°F) | −3.2 (26.2) | −2.3 (27.9) | 2.5 (36.5) | 10.0 (50.0) | 15.8 (60.4) | 19.5 (67.1) | 21.3 (70.3) | 20.5 (68.9) | 14.9 (58.8) | 8.6 (47.5) | 2.6 (36.7) | −1.8 (28.8) | 9.0 (48.2) |
| Mean daily minimum °C (°F) | −5.5 (22.1) | −5.0 (23.0) | −0.8 (30.6) | 5.7 (42.3) | 10.9 (51.6) | 14.8 (58.6) | 16.7 (62.1) | 15.7 (60.3) | 10.6 (51.1) | 5.1 (41.2) | 0.4 (32.7) | −3.9 (25.0) | 5.4 (41.7) |
| Record low °C (°F) | −31.1 (−24.0) | −32.2 (−26.0) | −24.9 (−12.8) | −10.4 (13.3) | −2.4 (27.7) | 2.5 (36.5) | 5.8 (42.4) | 3.3 (37.9) | −2.9 (26.8) | −17.8 (0.0) | −21.9 (−7.4) | −30.0 (−22.0) | −32.2 (−26.0) |
| Average precipitation mm (inches) | 38 (1.5) | 40 (1.6) | 40 (1.6) | 42 (1.7) | 65 (2.6) | 73 (2.9) | 68 (2.7) | 56 (2.2) | 57 (2.2) | 46 (1.8) | 46 (1.8) | 47 (1.9) | 618 (24.3) |
| Average extreme snow depth cm (inches) | 9 (3.5) | 11 (4.3) | 7 (2.8) | 0 (0) | 0 (0) | 0 (0) | 0 (0) | 0 (0) | 0 (0) | 0 (0) | 2 (0.8) | 5 (2.0) | 11 (4.3) |
| Average rainy days | 8 | 7 | 9 | 13 | 14 | 15 | 14 | 11 | 14 | 12 | 12 | 9 | 138 |
| Average snowy days | 17 | 17 | 10 | 2 | 0.2 | 0 | 0 | 0 | 0.03 | 2 | 9 | 16 | 73 |
| Average relative humidity (%) | 83.8 | 80.2 | 71.6 | 61.0 | 62.4 | 64.2 | 65.9 | 64.4 | 70.7 | 77.2 | 85.0 | 86.2 | 72.7 |
| Mean monthly sunshine hours | 42 | 64 | 112 | 162 | 257 | 273 | 287 | 252 | 189 | 123 | 51 | 31 | 1,843 |
Source 1: Pogoda.ru.net, Central Observatory for Geophysics (extremes), World Meteorological Organization (humidity 1991–2020)
Source 2: Danish Meteorological Institute (sun, 1931–1960)

== Legal status, local government and politics ==
=== Legal status and local government ===
The municipality of the city of Kyiv has a special legal status within Ukraine compared to the other administrative subdivisions of the country. The most significant difference is that the city is considered as a region of Ukraine (see Regions of Ukraine). It is the only city that has double jurisdiction. The Head of City State Administration – the city's governor – is appointed by the president of Ukraine, while the Head of the City Council – the mayor of Kyiv – is elected by local popular vote.

The mayor of Kyiv is Vitali Klitschko, who was sworn in on 5 June 2014, after he had won the 25 May 2014 Kyiv mayoral elections with almost 57% of the votes. Since 25 June 2014, Klitschko is also Head of Kyiv City Administration. Klitschko was last reelected in the 2020 Kyiv local election with 50.52% of the votes, in the first round of the election.

Most key buildings of the national government are along Hrushevsky Street (vulytsia Mykhaila Hrushevskoho) and Institute Street (vulytsia Instytutska). Hrushevsky Street is named after the Ukrainian academician, politician, historian, and statesman Mykhailo Hrushevsky, who served as the chairman of the Central Rada and wrote multiple academic books, notably History of Ukraine-Rus'. That portion of the city is also unofficially known as the government quarter (урядовий квартал).

The city state administration and council is in the Kyiv City council building on Khreshchatyk Street. The oblast state administration and council is in the oblast council building on ploshcha Lesi Ukrainky ("Lesya Ukrainka Square").

Government buildings in Kyiv
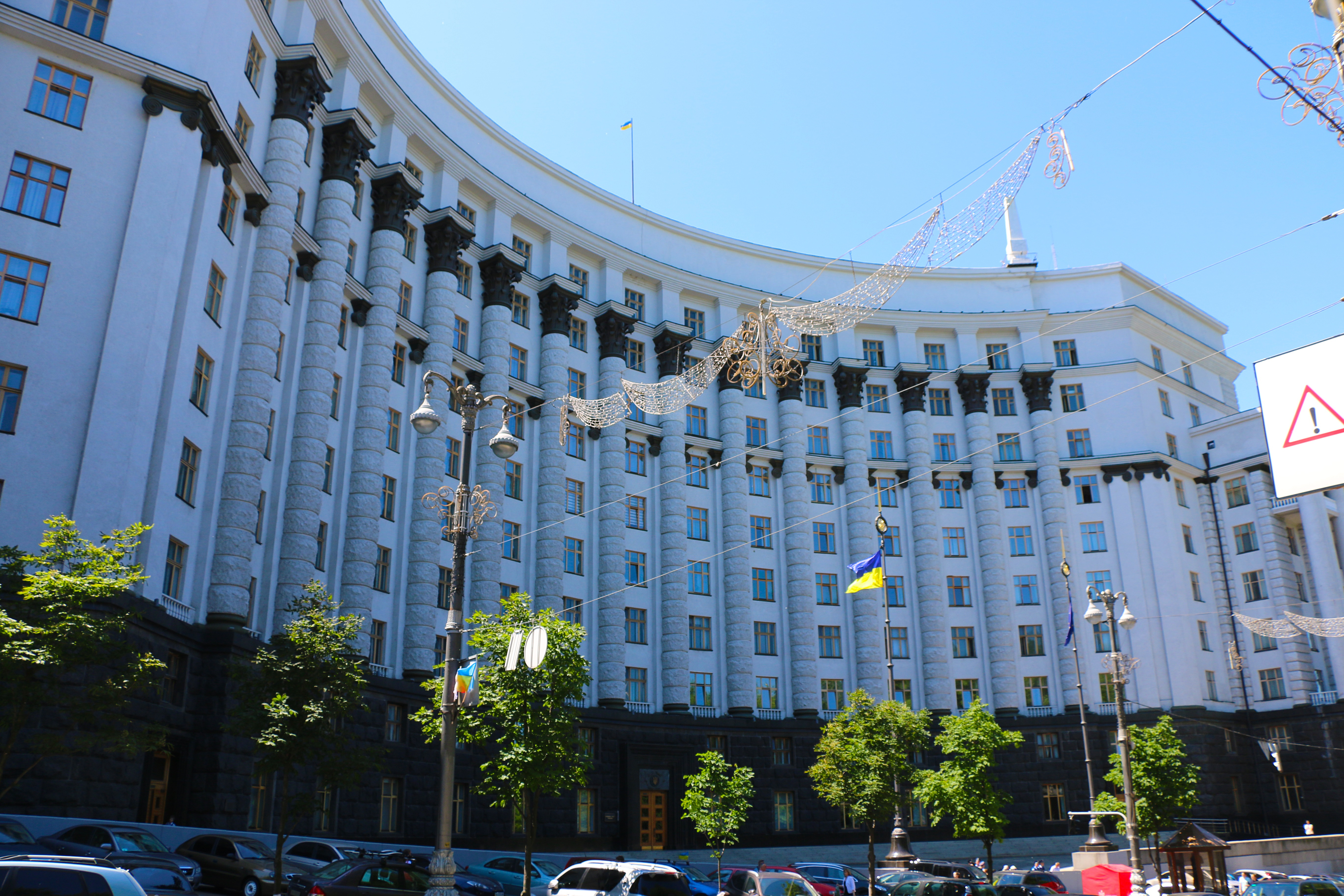
The seat of the Cabinet of Ministers of Ukraine

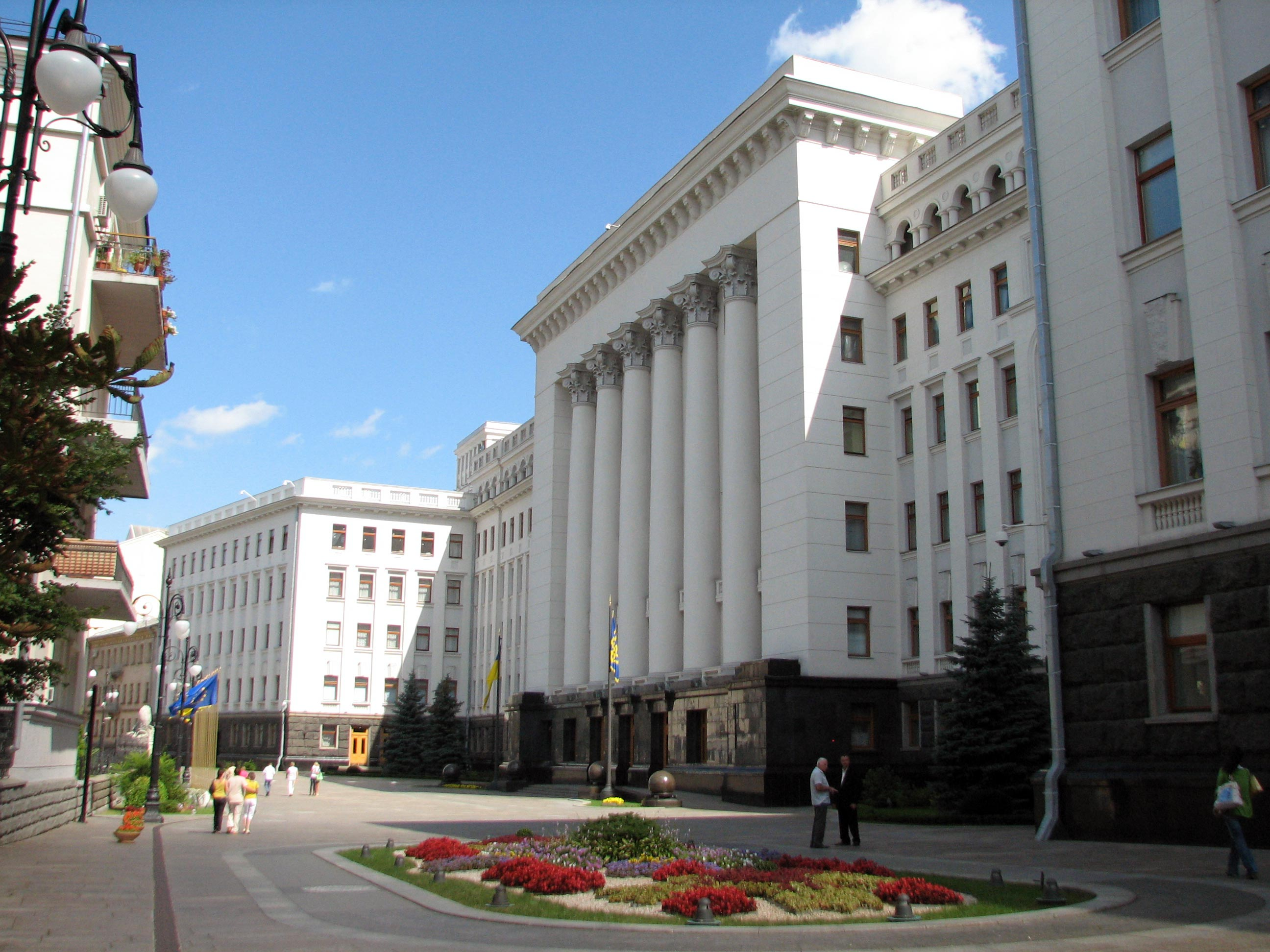
The presidential administration building

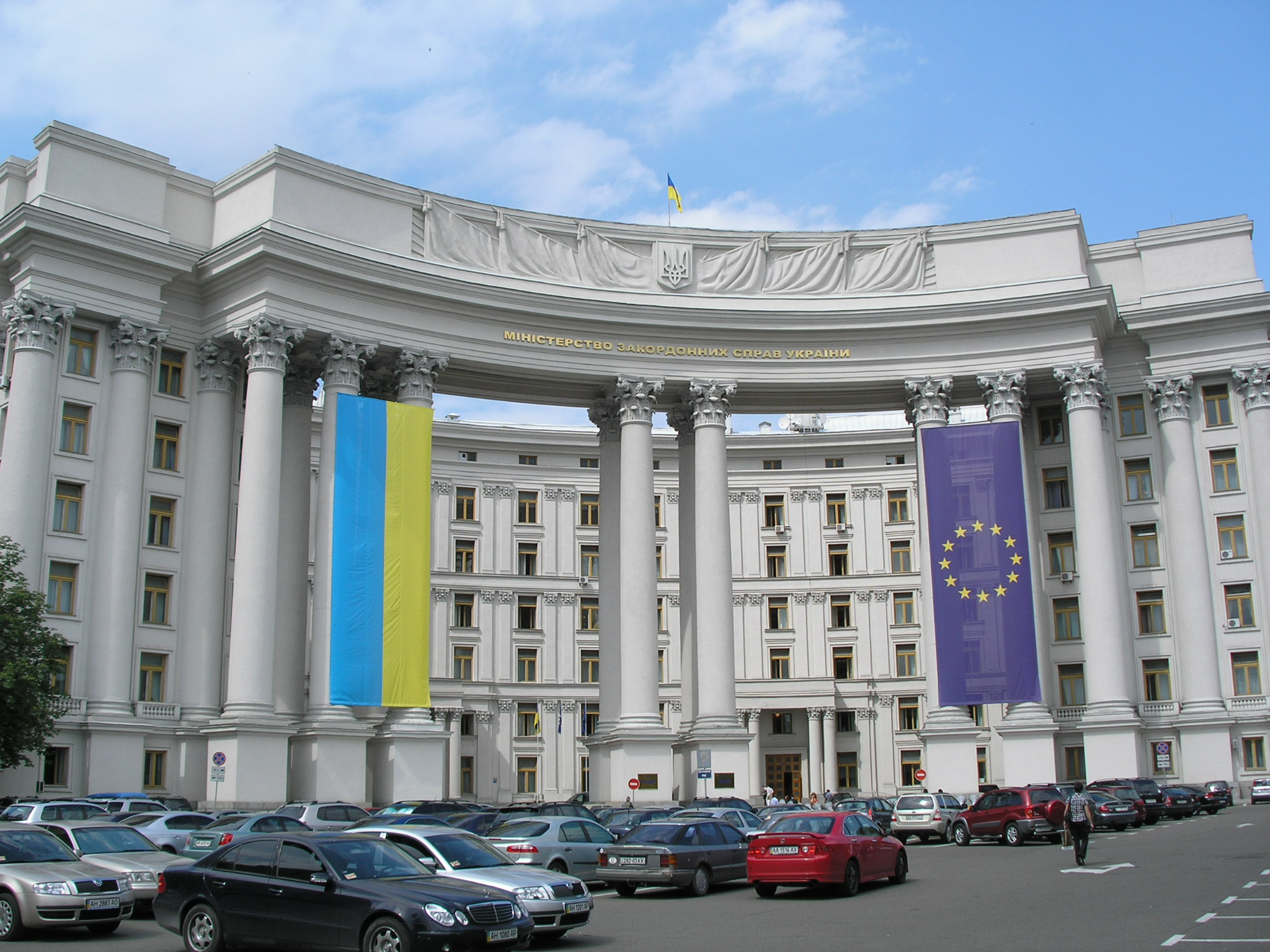
The Ministry of Foreign Affairs

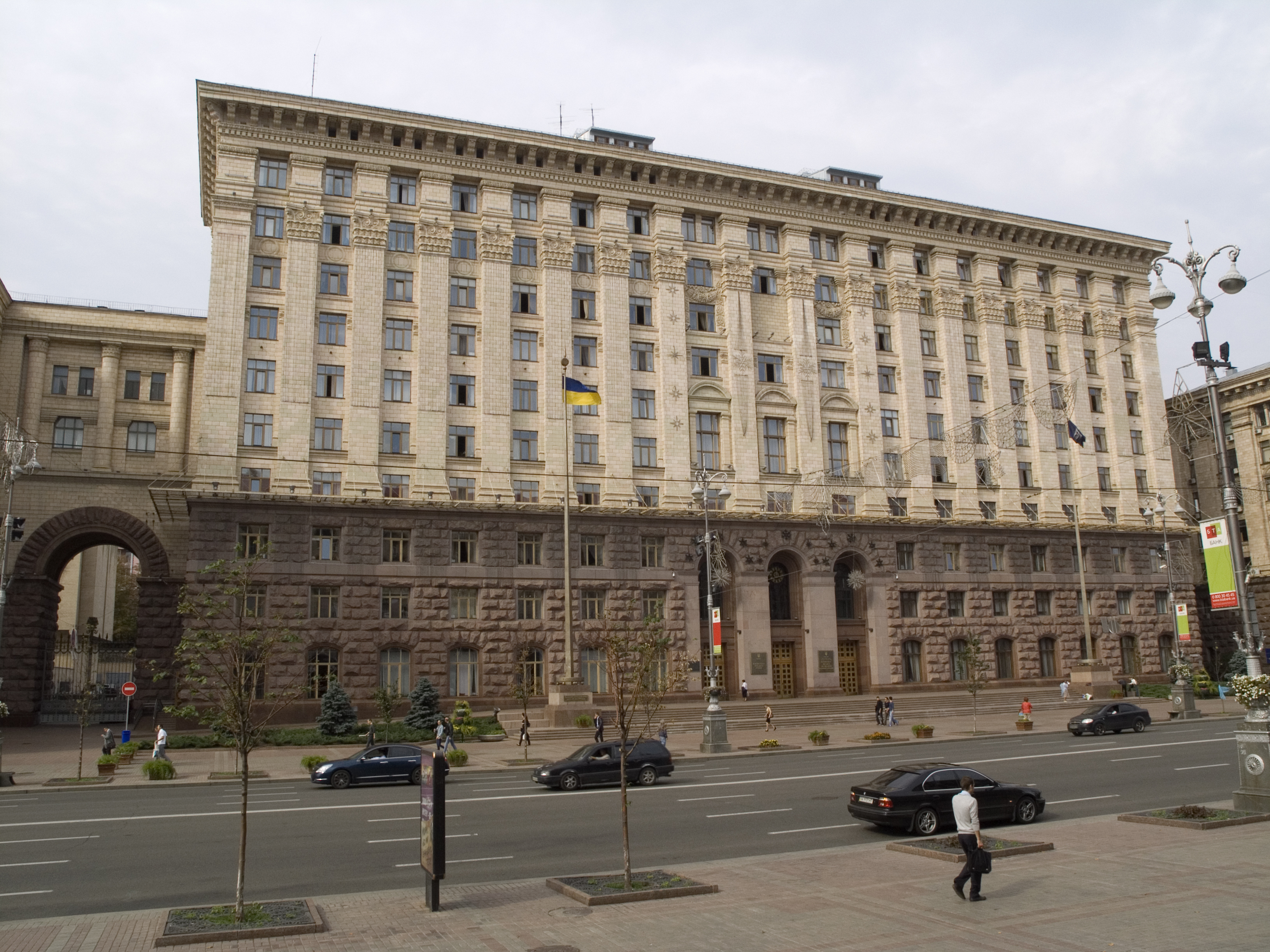
The seat of Kyiv City State and City Council on Khreshchatyk Street

=== Politics ===
As of 2013, so-called National Democratic parties advocating tighter integration with the European Union received the most votes during elections in Kyiv. In a poll conducted by the Kyiv International Institute of Sociology in the first half of February 2014, 5.3% of those polled in Kyiv believed "Ukraine and Russia must unite into a single state", nationwide this percentage was 12.5.

=== Subdivisions ===
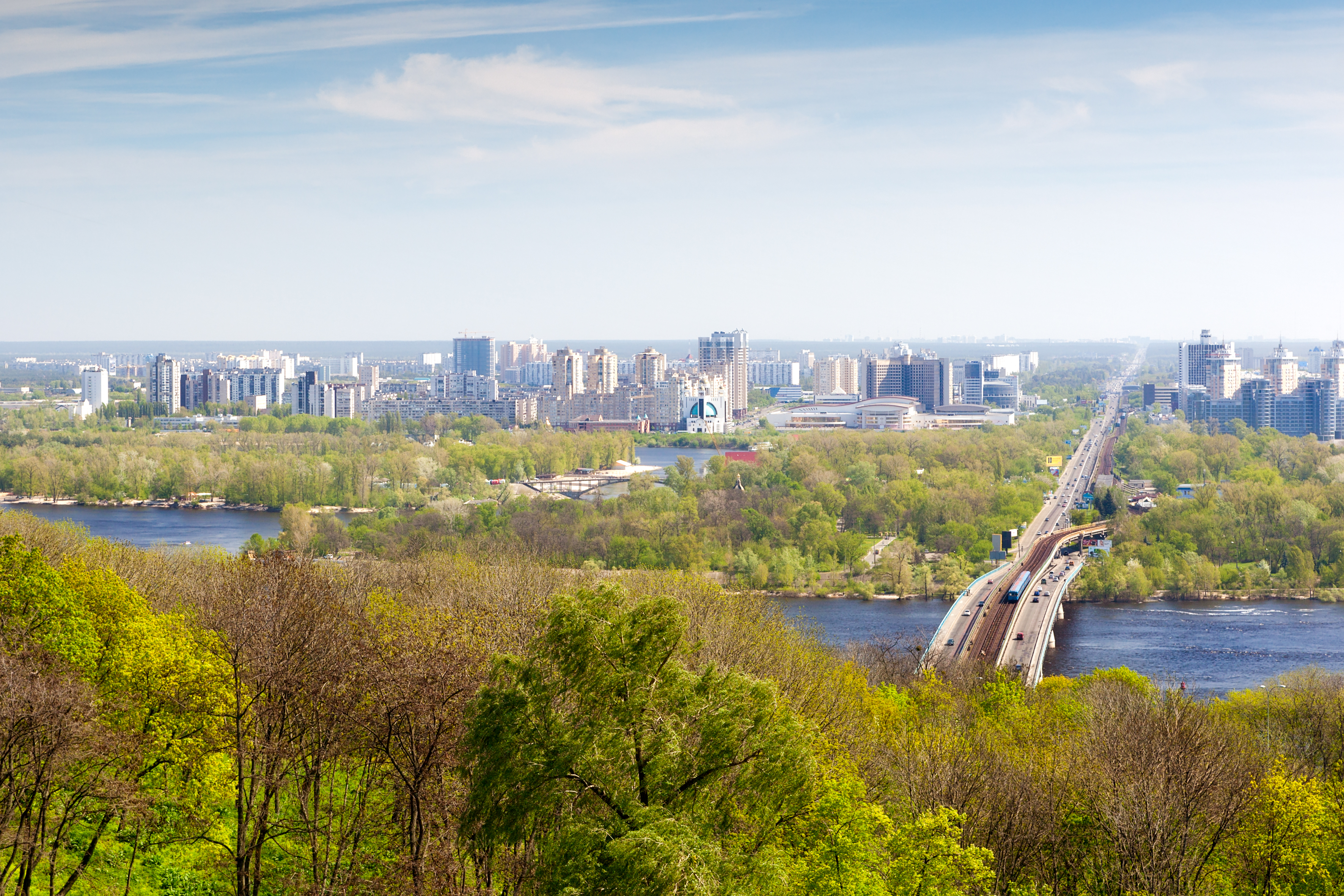
A view of the left bank neighbourhoods of Kyiv

==== Traditional subdivision ====
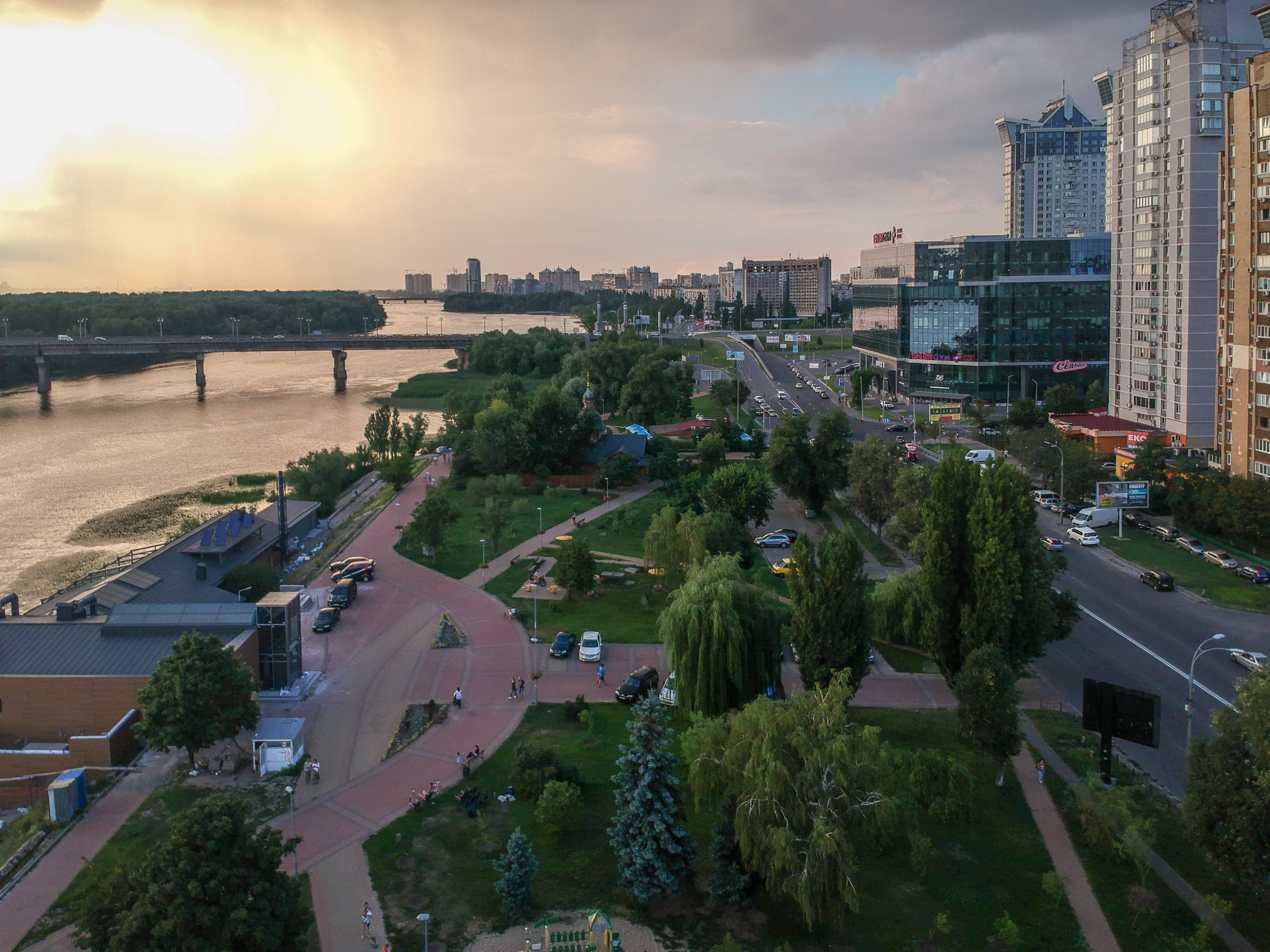
Berezniaky neighbourhood in Dniprovskyi District

The Dnieper River naturally divides Kyiv into the Right Bank and the Left Bank areas. Historically on the western right bank of the river, the city expanded into the left bank only in the 20th century. Most of Kyiv's attractions as well as the majority of business and governmental institutions are on the right bank. The eastern "Left Bank" is predominantly residential. There are large industrial and green areas in both the Right Bank and the Left Bank.

Kyiv is further informally divided into historical or territorial neighbourhoods, each housing from about 5,000 to 100,000 inhabitants.

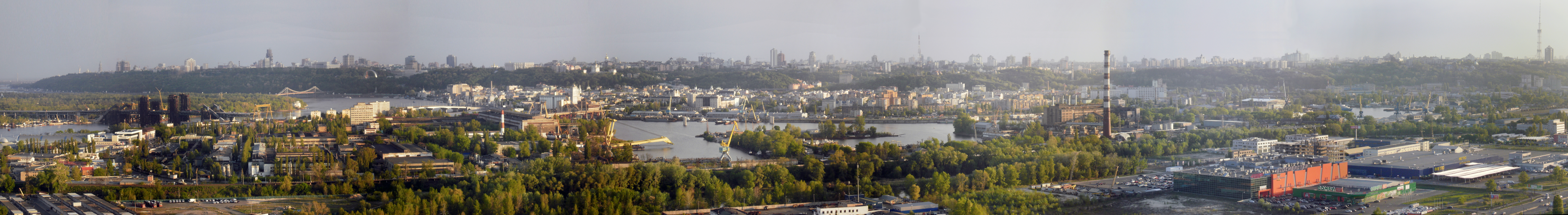
A panoramic view of Right-Bank Kyiv, where the city centre is located (May 2011)

==== Formal subdivision ====
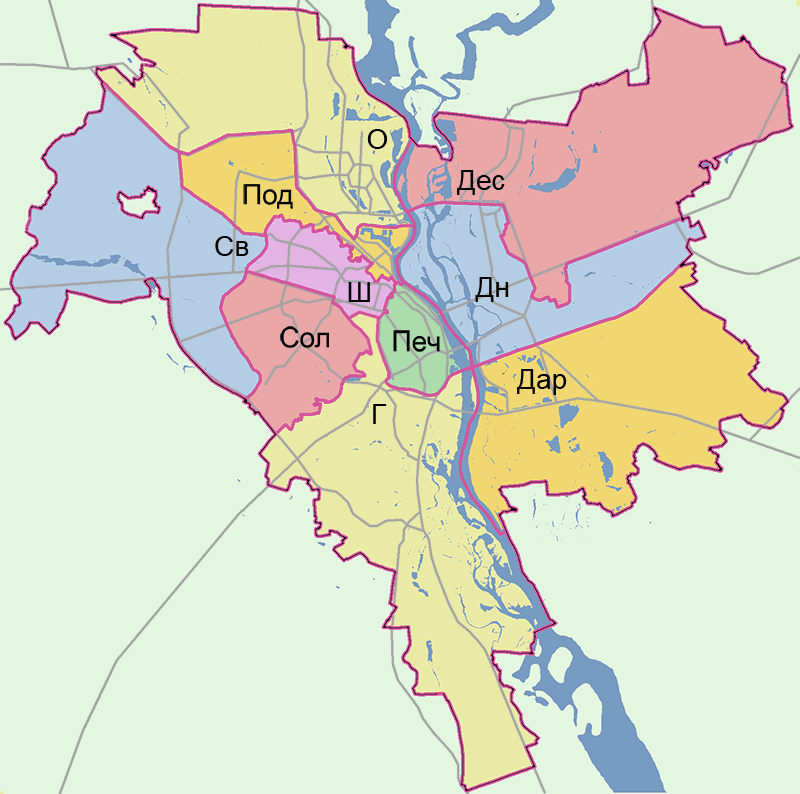
The ten districts (raions) of Kyiv: Г – Holosiivskyi District; О – Obolonskyi District; Печ – Pecherskyi District; Под – Podilskyi District; Ш – Shevchenkivskyi District; Св – Sviatoshynskyi District; Сол – Solomianskyi District; Дар – Darnytskyi District; Дес – Desnianskyi District; Дн – Dniprovskyi District

The first known formal subdivision of Kyiv dates to 1810 when the city was subdivided into 4 parts: Pechersk, Staryi Kyiv, and the first and the second parts of Podil. In 1833–1834 according to Tsar Nicholas I's decree, Kyiv was subdivided into 6 police raions (districts); later being increased to 10. In 1917, there were 8 Raion Councils (Duma), which were reorganised by bolsheviks into 6 Party-Territory Raions.

During the Soviet era, as the city was expanding, the number of raions also gradually increased. These newer districts of the city, along with some older areas were then named in honour of prominent communists and socialist-revolutionary figures; however, due to the way in which many communist party members eventually, after a certain period of time, fell out of favour and so were replaced with new, fresher minds, so too did the names of Kyiv's districts change accordingly.

The last district reform took place in 2001 when the number of districts was decreased from 14 to 10.

Under Oleksandr Omelchenko (mayor from 1999 to 2006), there were further plans for the merger of some districts and revision of their boundaries, and the total number of districts had been planned to be decreased from 10 to 7. With the election of the new mayor-elect (Leonid Chernovetskyi) in 2006, these plans were shelved.

Each district has its own locally elected council with jurisdiction over a limited scope of affairs.

== Demographics ==
City of Kyiv population pyramid in 2022

According to the official registration statistics, there were 2,847,200 residents within the city limits of Kyiv in July 2013.

=== Historical population ===
Historical population
| Year | Pop. | ±% |
|---|---|---|
| 1200 | 36,000 ~ 50,000 (Note: "...Weighing these factors, scholars have offered figures ranging from 36,000 to 50,000 for the population of Kiev at the end of the twelfth century.") | — |
| 1246 | 2,000 (Note: It is unclear what the population was after the Mongol Siege of Kiev (1240). Carpini's account is vague, contradictory, and has been questioned. Petro Tolochko (1980) estimated that there might have been about 2,000 inhabitants left, compared to the "36,000 to 50,000" people that dwelled in the city around 1200.) | — |
| 1552 | 4,500 | +125.0% |
| 1571 | 6,250 | +38.9% |
| 1622 | 11,000 | +76.0% |
| 1647 | 15,000 | +36.4% |
| 1666 | 10,000 | −33.3% |
| 1763 | 42,000 | +320.0% |
| 1797 | 19,000 | −54.8% |
| 1835 | 36,500 | +92.1% |
| 1845 | 50,000 | +37.0% |
| 1856 | 56,000 | +12.0% |
| 1865 | 71,300 | +27.3% |
| 1874 | 127,500 | +78.8% |
| 1884 | 154,500 | +21.2% |
| 1897 | 247,700 | +60.3% |
| 1905 | 450,000 | +81.7% |
| 1909 | 468,000 | +4.0% |
| 1912 | 442,000 | −5.6% |
| 1914 | 626,300 | +41.7% |
| 1917 | 430,500 | −31.3% |
| 1919 | 544,000 | +26.4% |
| 1922 | 366,000 | −32.7% |
| 1923 | 413,000 | +12.8% |
| 1926 | 513,000 | +24.2% |
| 1930 | 578,000 | +12.7% |
| 1940 | 930,000 | +60.9% |
| 1943 | 180,000 | −80.6% |
| 1956 | 991,000 | +450.6% |
| 1959 | 1,109,840 | +12.0% |
| 1970 | 1,631,908 | +47.0% |
| 1979 | 2,143,855 | +31.4% |
| 1989 | 2,602,754 | +21.4% |
| 2001 | 2,611,327 | +0.3% |
| 2011 | 2,799,199 | +7.2% |
| 2022 | 2,952,301 | +5.5% |
at 1 January of years 10xx-1959, 1959-2022

According to the All-Ukrainian Census, the population of Kyiv in 2001 was 2,611,327. The historic changes in population are shown in the side table. According to the census, some 1,393,000 (53.3%) were female and 1,219,000 (46.7%) were male. Comparing the results with the previous census (1989) shows the trend of population ageing which, while prevalent throughout the country, is partly offset in Kyiv by the inflow of working age migrants. Some 1,069,700 people had higher or completed secondary education, a significant increase of 21.7% since 1989.

The June 2007 unofficial population estimate based on amount of bakery products sold in the city (thus including temporary visitors and commuters) gave a number of at least 3.5 million people.

=== Ethnic composition ===
Kyiv's ethnic composition has shifted greatly over the last centuries. According to the census of March 2, 1874, conducted by the local branch of the Russian Geographical Society, there were 127,205 people living in Kyiv. Of these, 80% spoke "Russian", 11% spoke "Jewish", 6% spoke Polish and 2% spoke German. Of the "Russian" speakers, 39% were recorded as speaking Little Russian (Ukrainian), which meant that Ukrainian speakers accounted for 30% of the city as a whole. Of the remaining "Russian" speakers, however, there were only 10% who spoke Greater Russian (Russian) and 2% who spoke Belarusian. The remaining 49% spoke in "generally Russian speech". According to the official census of 1897, the number of Great Russian speakers rose to 54%; speakers of Little Russian accounted for 22%. Jewish speakers accounted for 12%, Polish 6.7%.

By the September 1917 city-census of Kyiv, conducted by the authorities of the Ukrainian People's Republic, the Ukrainian share of the population had been reduced to only 16%, while Russians now made up a majority at 50%. The March 1919 Kyiv city census, conducted by the Bolshevik authorities, showed an increase in the percentage of the population identifying as Ukrainian to 25%. From then on, the city's Ukrainian population once again began to expand in terms of their share of the population, slowly returning to its former level. By the 1926 Soviet census, Ukrainians, at 41.6%, had once again begun to outnumber Russians, who made up 25.5%. By the 1959 Soviet census, Kyiv was once more a Ukrainian majority city, with 60% of the population identifying as such, the same percentage as in 1874.

According to the 2001 census data, more than 130 nationalities and ethnic groups reside within the territory of Kyiv. Ukrainians constitute the largest ethnic group in Kyiv, accounting for 2,110,800 people, or 82.2% of the population. Russians comprise 337,300 (13.1%), Jews 17,900 (0.7%), Belarusians 16,500 (0.6%), Poles 6,900 (0.3%), Armenians 4,900 (0.2%), Azerbaijanis 2,600 (0.1%), Tatars 2,500 (0.1%), Georgians 2,400 (0.1%), Moldovans 1,900 (0.1%).

A 2015 study by the International Republican Institute found that 94% of Kyiv was ethnic Ukrainian, and 5% ethnic Russian. Most of the city's non-Slav population comprises Tatars, South Caucasians, and other peoples from the former Soviet Union.

=== Language statistics ===
Both Ukrainian and Russian are commonly spoken in the city; approximately 75% of Kyiv's population responded "Ukrainian" to the 2001 census question on their native language, roughly 25% responded "Russian". According to a 2006 survey, Ukrainian is used at home by 23% of Kyivans, 52% use Russian, and 24% switch between both. In the 2003 sociological survey, when the question "What language do you use in everyday life?" was asked, 52% said "mostly Russian", 32% "both Russian and Ukrainian in equal measure", 14% "mostly Ukrainian", and 4.3% "exclusively Ukrainian".

According to the census of 1897, of Kyiv's approximately 240,000 people approximately 56% of the population spoke the Russian language, 23% spoke the Ukrainian language, 13% spoke Yiddish, 7% spoke Polish and 1% spoke the Belarusian language.

A 2015 study by the International Republican Institute found that the languages spoken at home in Kyiv were Ukrainian (27%), Russian (32%), and an equal combination of Ukrainian and Russian (40%).

=== Jews ===
The Jews of Kyiv are first mentioned in a 10th-century letter. The Jewish population remained relatively small until the nineteenth century. A series of pogroms was carried out in 1882, and another in 1905. On the eve of World War I, the city's Jewish population was over 81,000. In 1939 there were approximately 224,000 Jews in Kyiv, some of whom fled the city ahead of the German invasion of the Soviet Union that began in June 1941. On 29 and 30 September 1941, nearly 34,000 Kyivan Jews were massacred at Babi Yar by the Wehrmacht, SS, Ukrainian Auxiliary Police, and local collaborators.

Jews began returning to Kyiv at the end of the war, but experienced another pogrom in September 1945. In the 21st century, Kyiv's Jewish community numbers about 20,000. There are two major synagogues in the city: the Great Choral Synagogue and the Brodsky Choral Synagogue.

== Cityscape ==
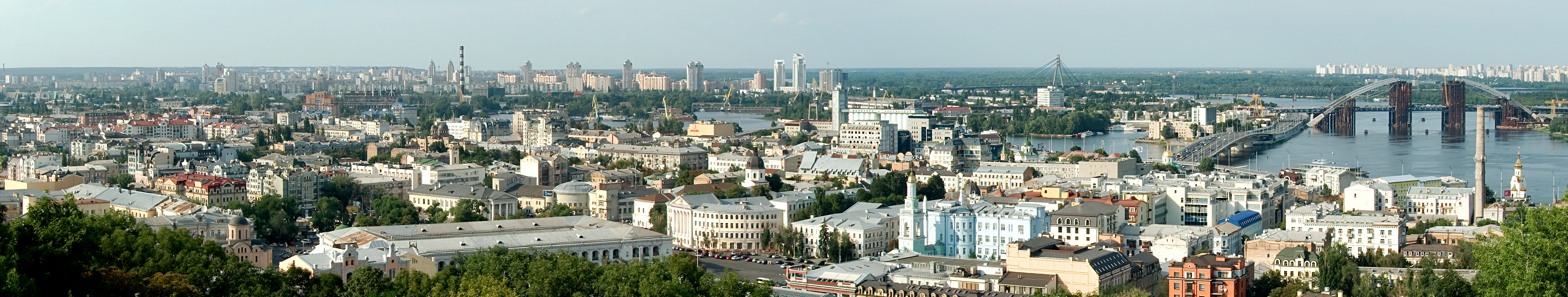
A panoramic view of Podil, one of Kyiv's central neighborhoods

Modern Kyiv is a mix of the old (Kyiv preserved about 70 percent of more than 1,000 buildings built during 1907–1914) and the new, seen in everything from the architecture to the stores and to the people themselves. When the capital of the Ukrainian SSR was moved from Kharkiv to Kyiv many new buildings were commissioned to give the city "the gloss and polish of a capital". In the discussions that centered on how to create a showcase city center, the current city center of Khreshchatyk and Maidan Nezalezhnosti (Independence Square) were not the obvious choices. Some of the early, ultimately not materialised, ideas included a part of Pechersk, Lypky, European Square, and Mykhailivska Square.

The plans of building massive monuments (of Vladimir Lenin and Stalin) were also abandoned, due to lack of money (in the 1930s–1950s) and because of Kyiv's hilly landscape. Experiencing rapid population growth between the 1970s and the mid-1990s, the city has continued its consistent growth after the turn of the millennium. As a result, Kyiv's central districts provide a dotted contrast of new, modern buildings among the pale yellows, blues, and greys of older apartments. Urban sprawl has gradually reduced, while population densities of suburbs has increased. The most expensive properties are in the Pechersk and Khreshchatyk areas. It is also prestigious to own a property in newly constructed buildings in the Kharkivskyi neighborhood or Obolon along the Dnieper.

Ukrainian independence at the turn of the millennium has heralded other changes. Western-style residential complexes, modern nightclubs, classy restaurants and prestigious hotels opened in the centre. And most importantly, with the easing of the visa rules in 2005, Ukraine is positioning itself as a prime tourist attraction, with Kyiv, among the other large cities, looking to profit from new opportunities. The centre of Kyiv has been cleaned up and buildings have been restored and redecorated, especially Khreshchatyk and Maidan Nezalezhnosti. Many historic areas of Kyiv, such as Andriivskyi Descent, have become popular street vendor locations, where one can find traditional Ukrainian art, religious items, books, game sets (most commonly chess) as well as jewellery for sale.

At the United Nations Climate Change Conference 2009, Kyiv was the only Commonwealth of Independent States city to have been inscribed into the TOP30 European Green City Index (placed 30th).

Kyiv's most famous historical architecture complexes are the St. Sophia Cathedral and the Kyiv Pechersk Lavra (Monastery of the Caves), which are recognized by UNESCO as a World Heritage Site. Noteworthy historical architectural landmarks also include the Mariinskyi Palace (designed and constructed from 1745 to 1752, then reconstructed in 1870), several Eastern Orthodox churches such as St. Michael's Cathedral, St. Andrew's, St. Volodymyr's, St. Cyril's, the reconstructed Golden Gate and others.

One of Kyiv's widely recognized modern landmarks is the highly visible giant Mother Ukraine statue made of titanium standing at the National Museum of the History of Ukraine in the Second World War on the Right bank of the Dnieper. Other notable sites is the cylindrical Salut hotel, across from Glory Square and the eternal flame at the World War Two memorial Tomb of the Unknown Soldier, and the House with Chimaeras.

Among Kyiv's best-known monuments are Mikhail Mikeshin's statue of Bohdan Khmelnytsky astride his horse near St. Sophia Cathedral, the venerated Vladimir the Great (St. Vladimir), the baptizer of Rus', overlooking the river above Podil from Saint Volodymyr Hill, the monument to Kyi, Shchek and Khoryv and Lybid, the legendary founders of the city at the Dnieper embankment. On Independence Square in the city centre, two monuments elevate two of the city protectors; the historic protector of Kyiv Michael Archangel atop a reconstruction of one of the old city's gates and a modern invention, the goddess-protector Berehynia atop a tall column.

Architecture and historically significant sites and monuments in Kyiv

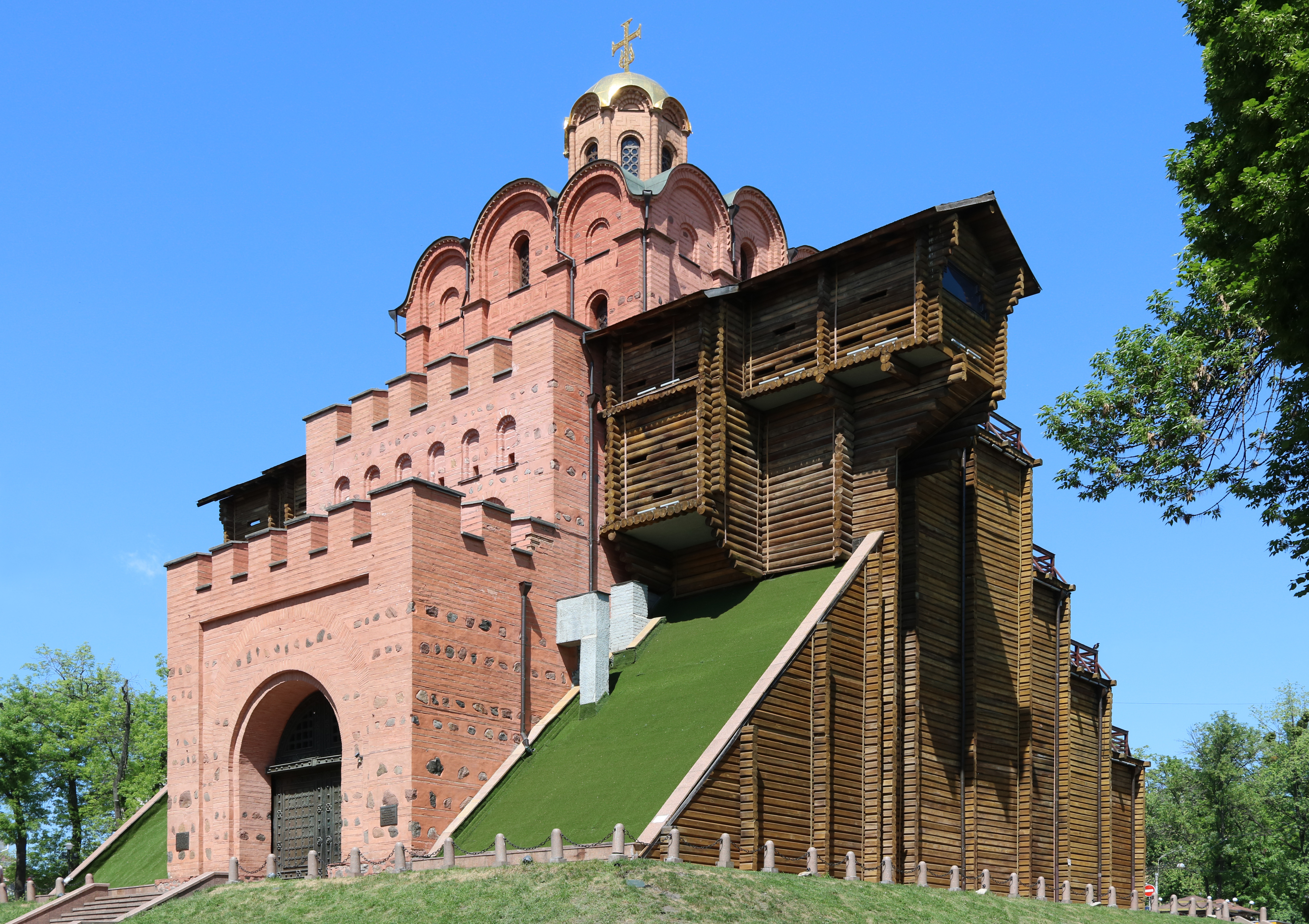
Golden Gate

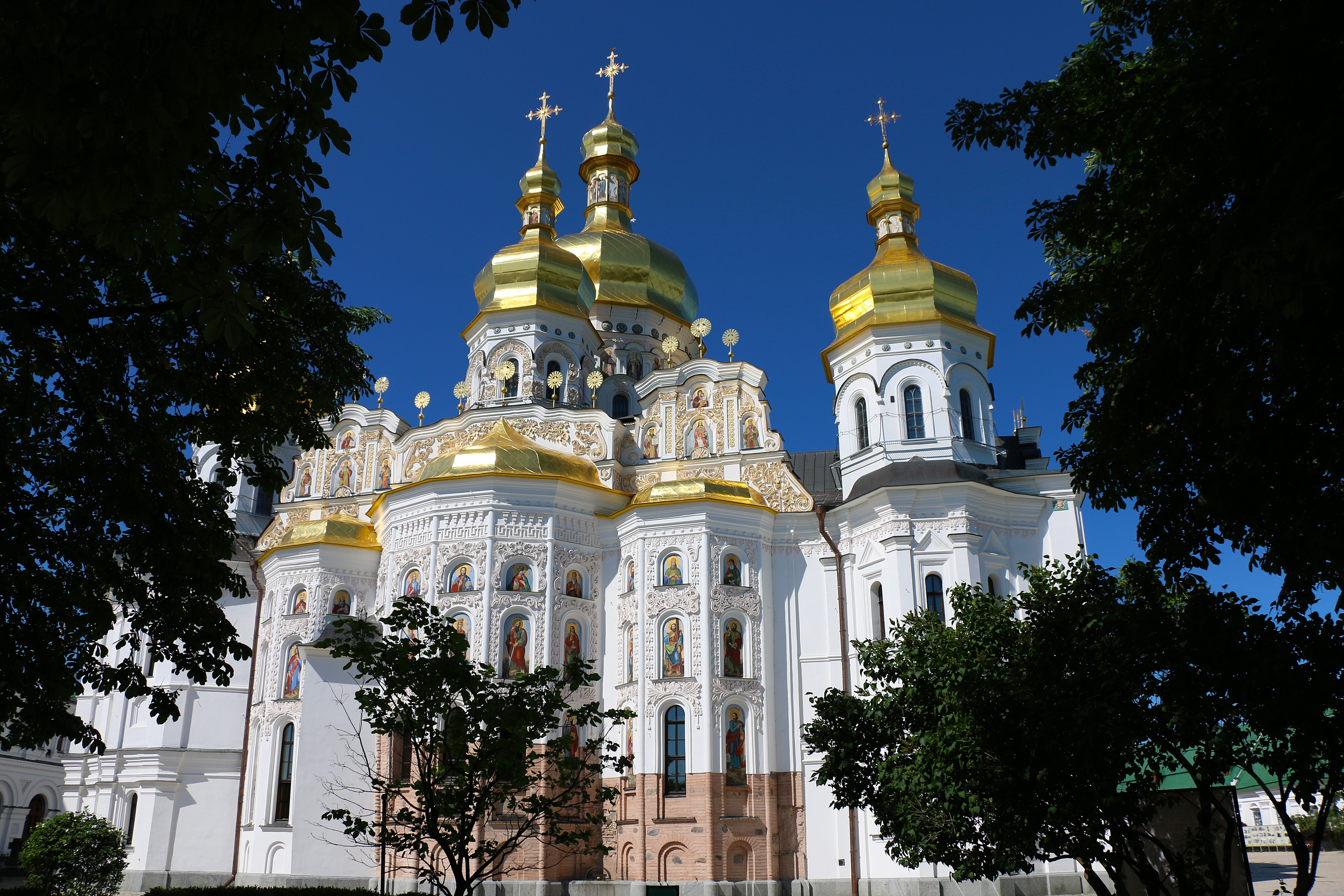
Holy Dormition Cathedral

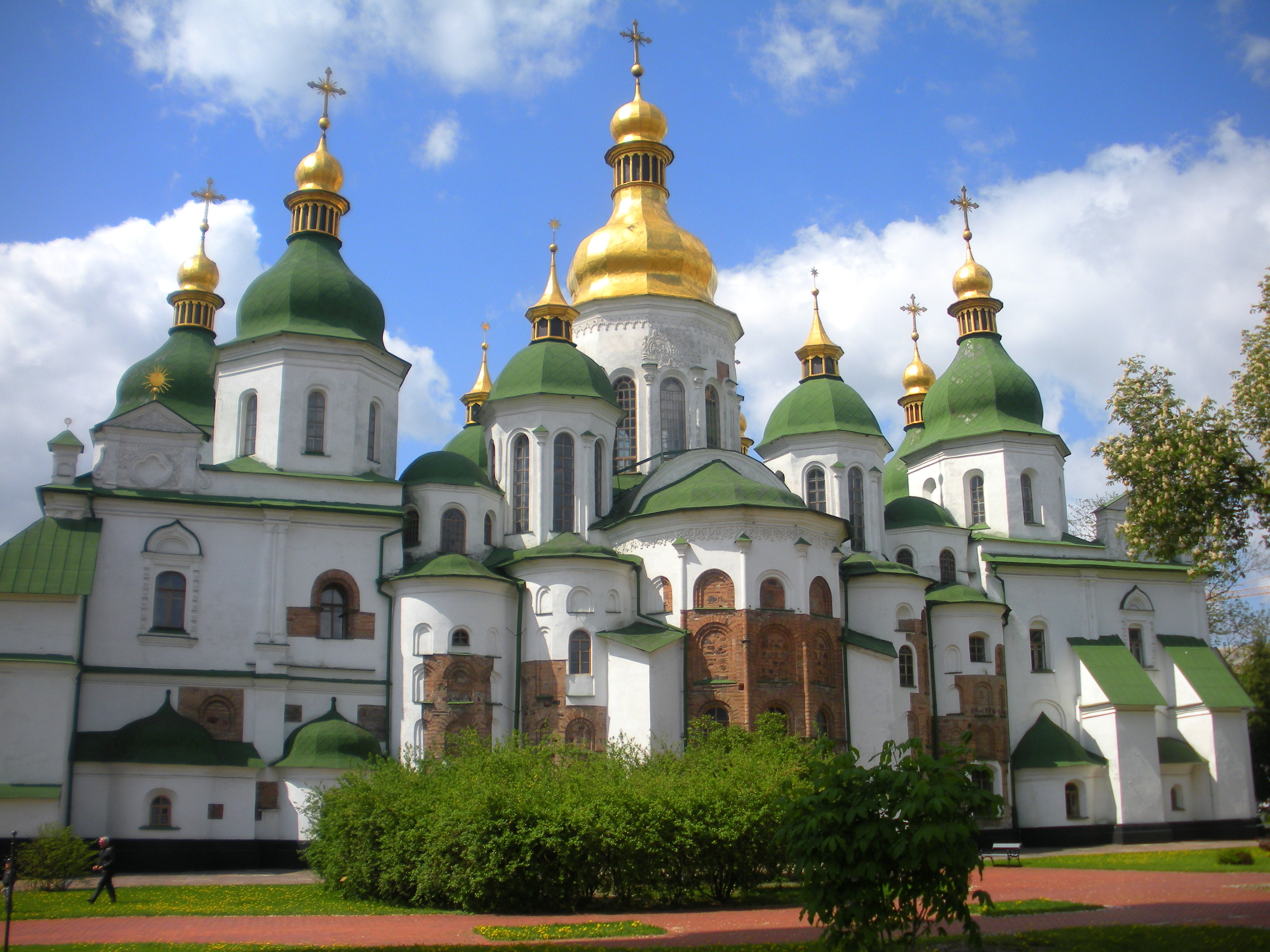
St. Sophia Cathedral

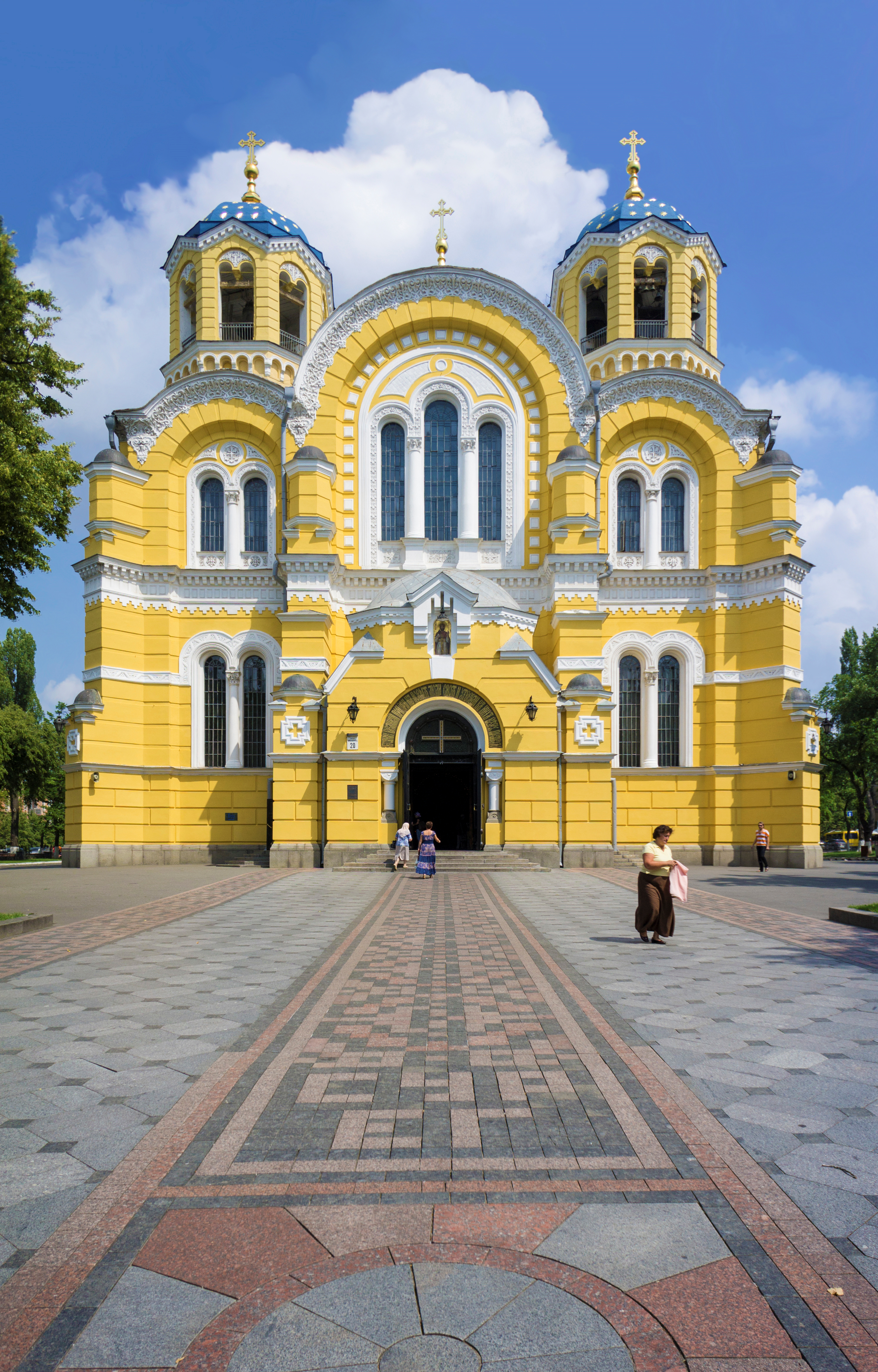
St. Volodymyr's Cathedral

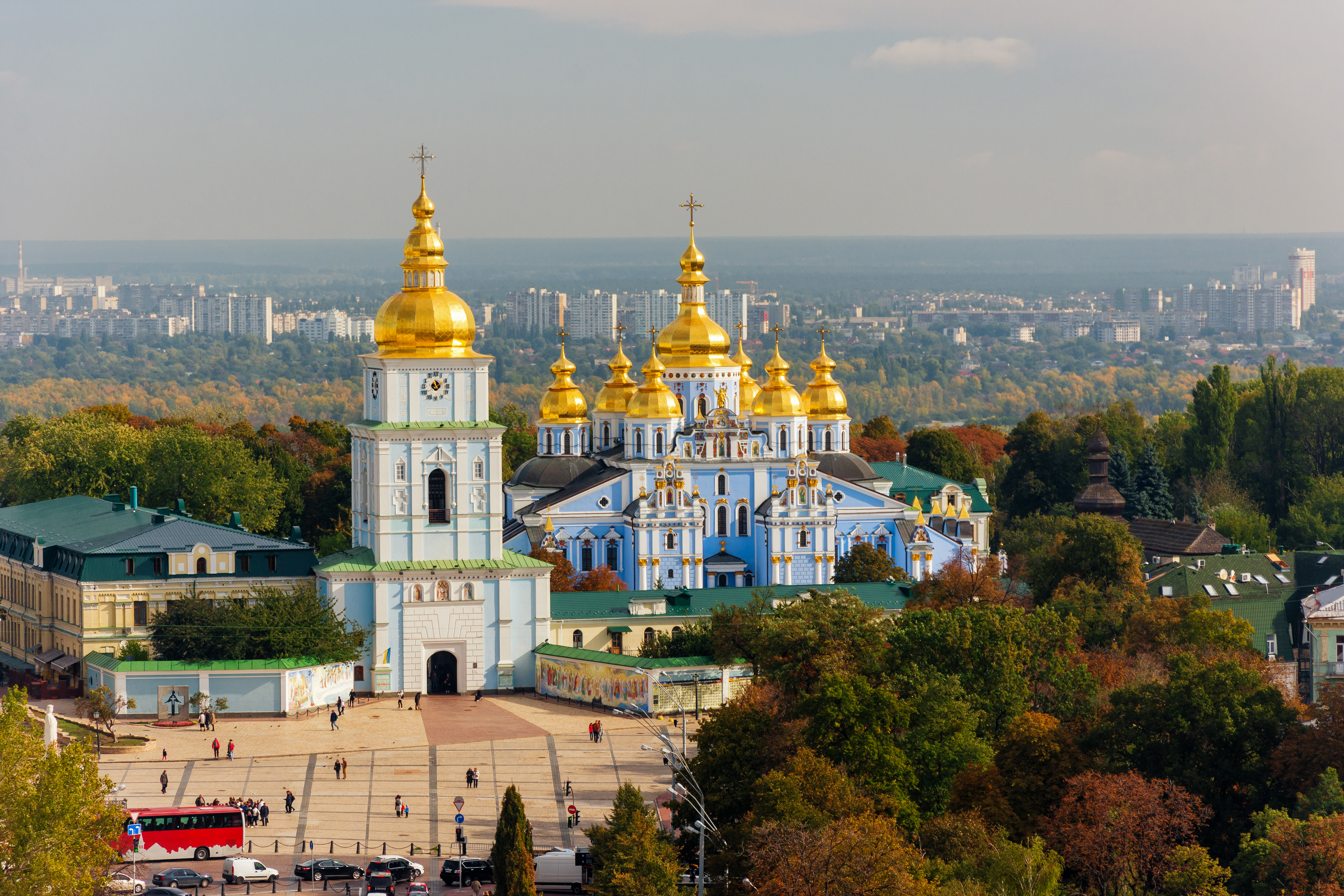
St. Michael's Golden-Domed Monastery

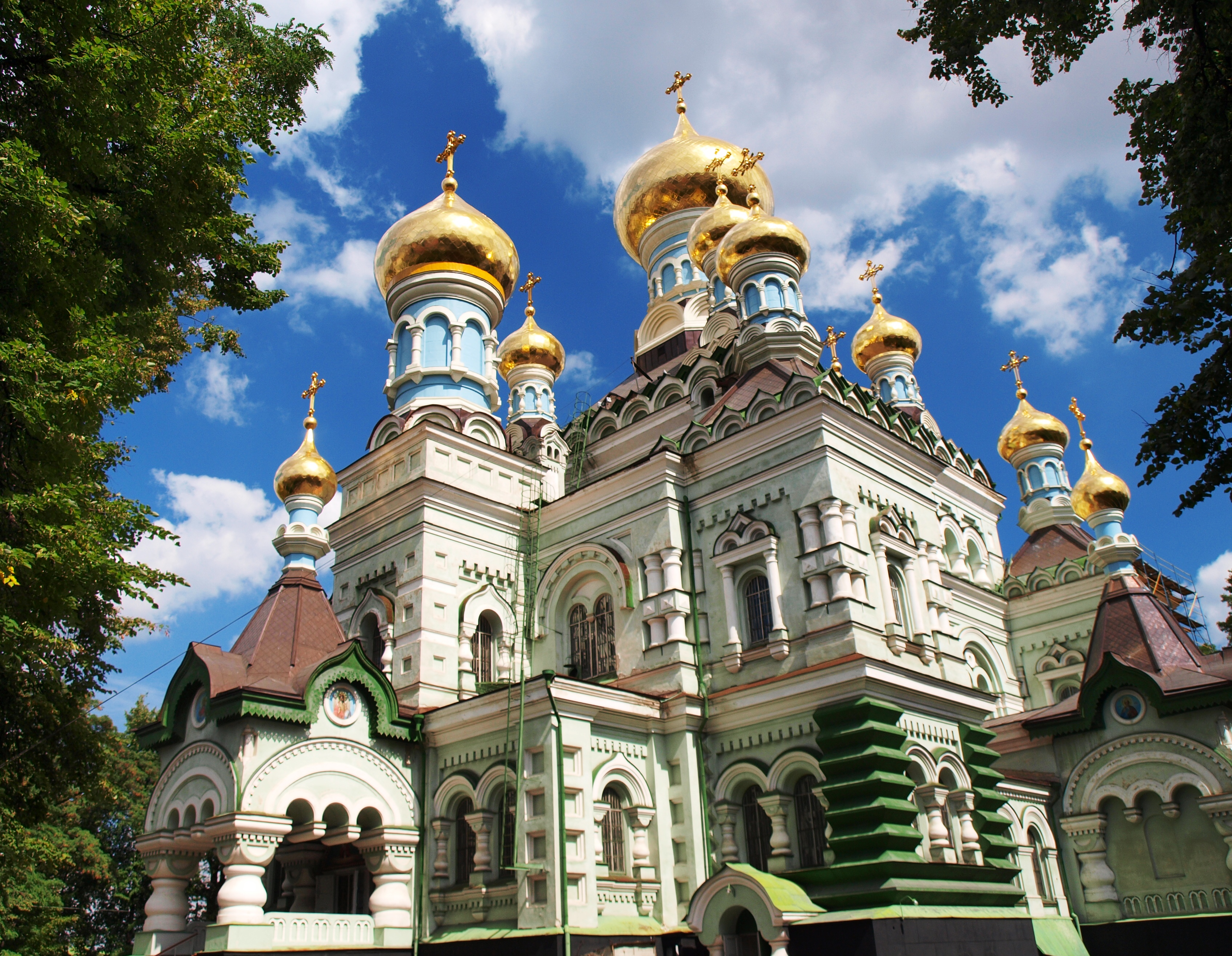
Cathedral of St Nicholas, Pokrovsky Nunnery

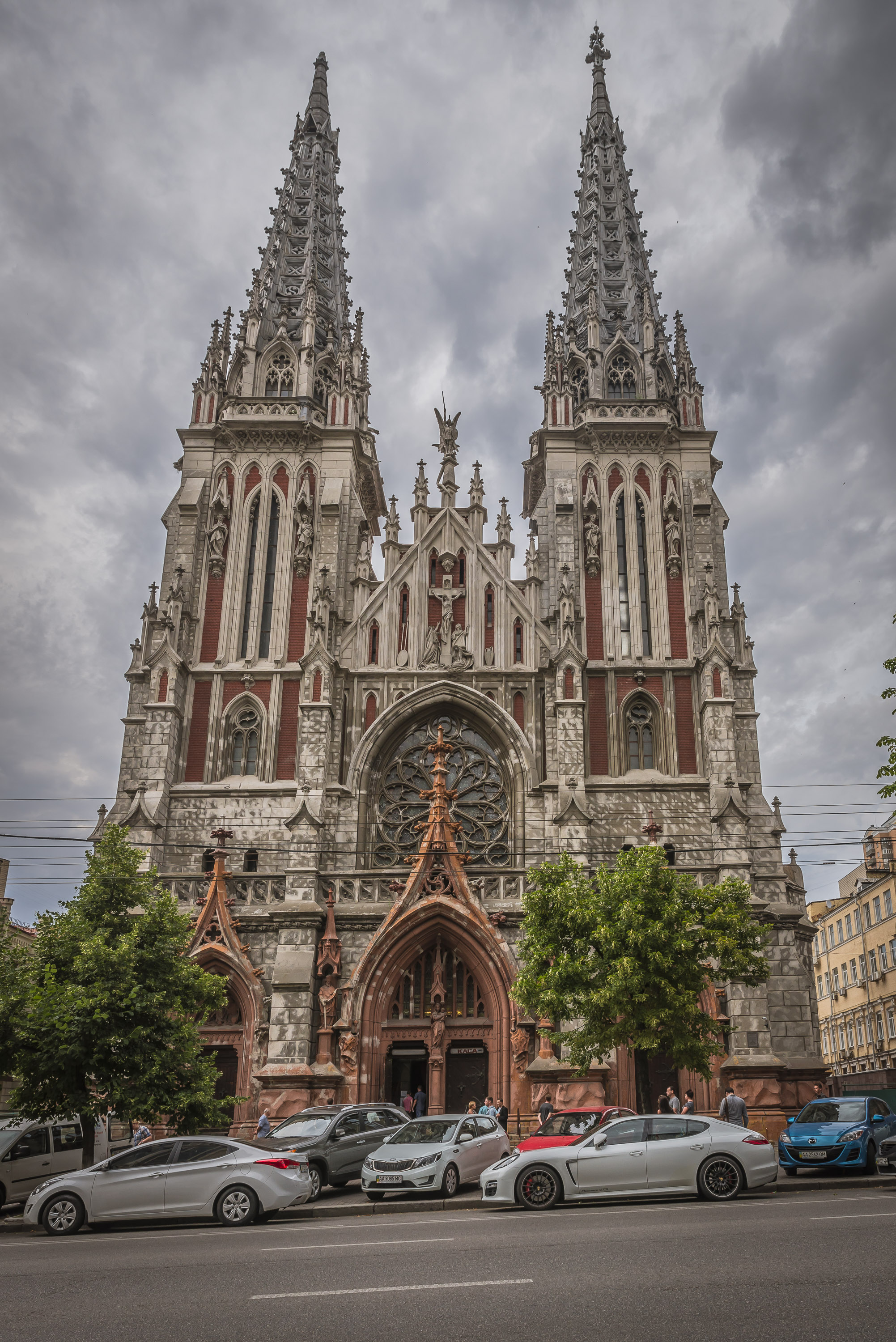
St. Nicholas Roman Catholic Cathedral

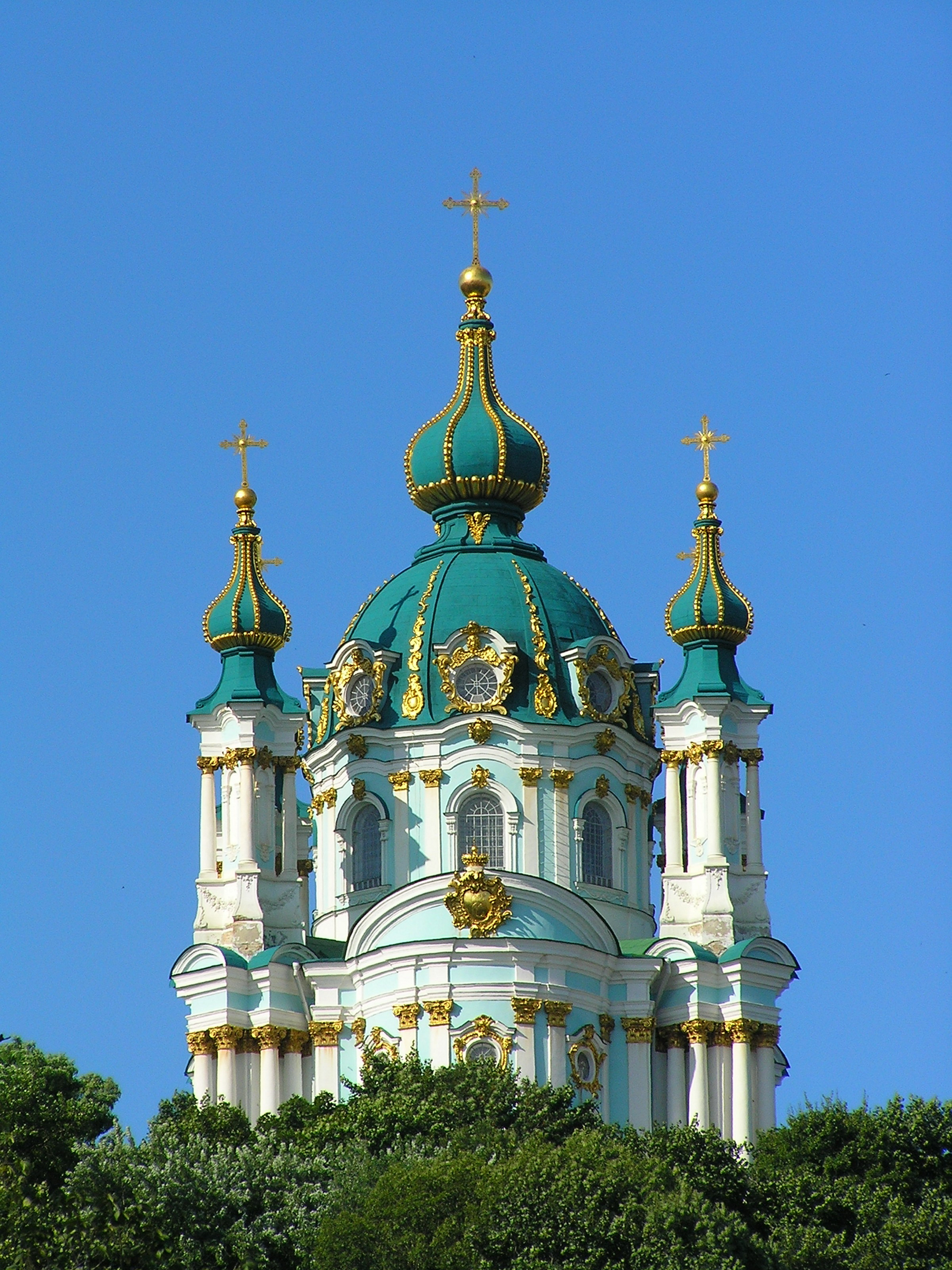
Saint Andrew's Church

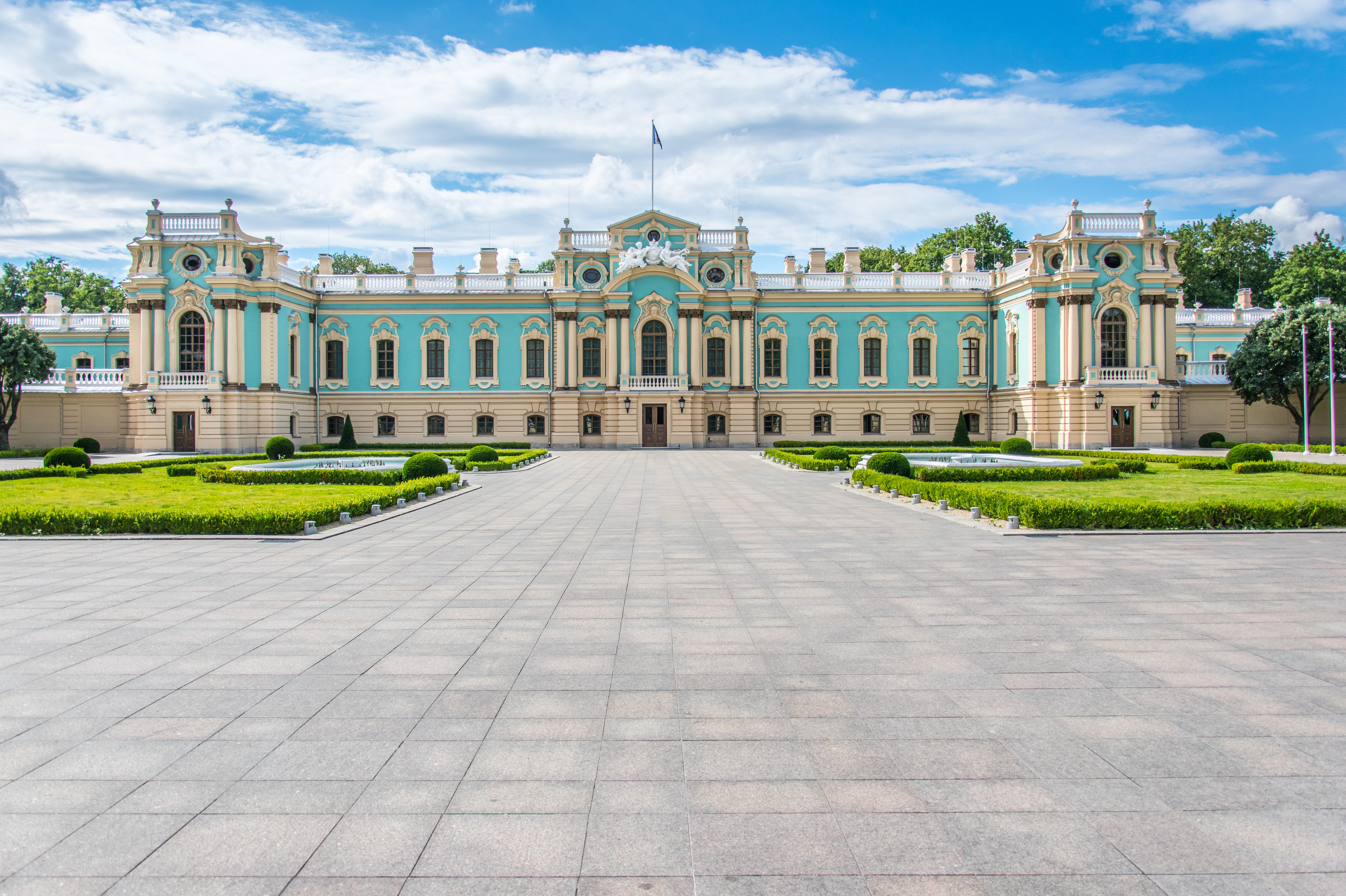
Mariinskyi Palace

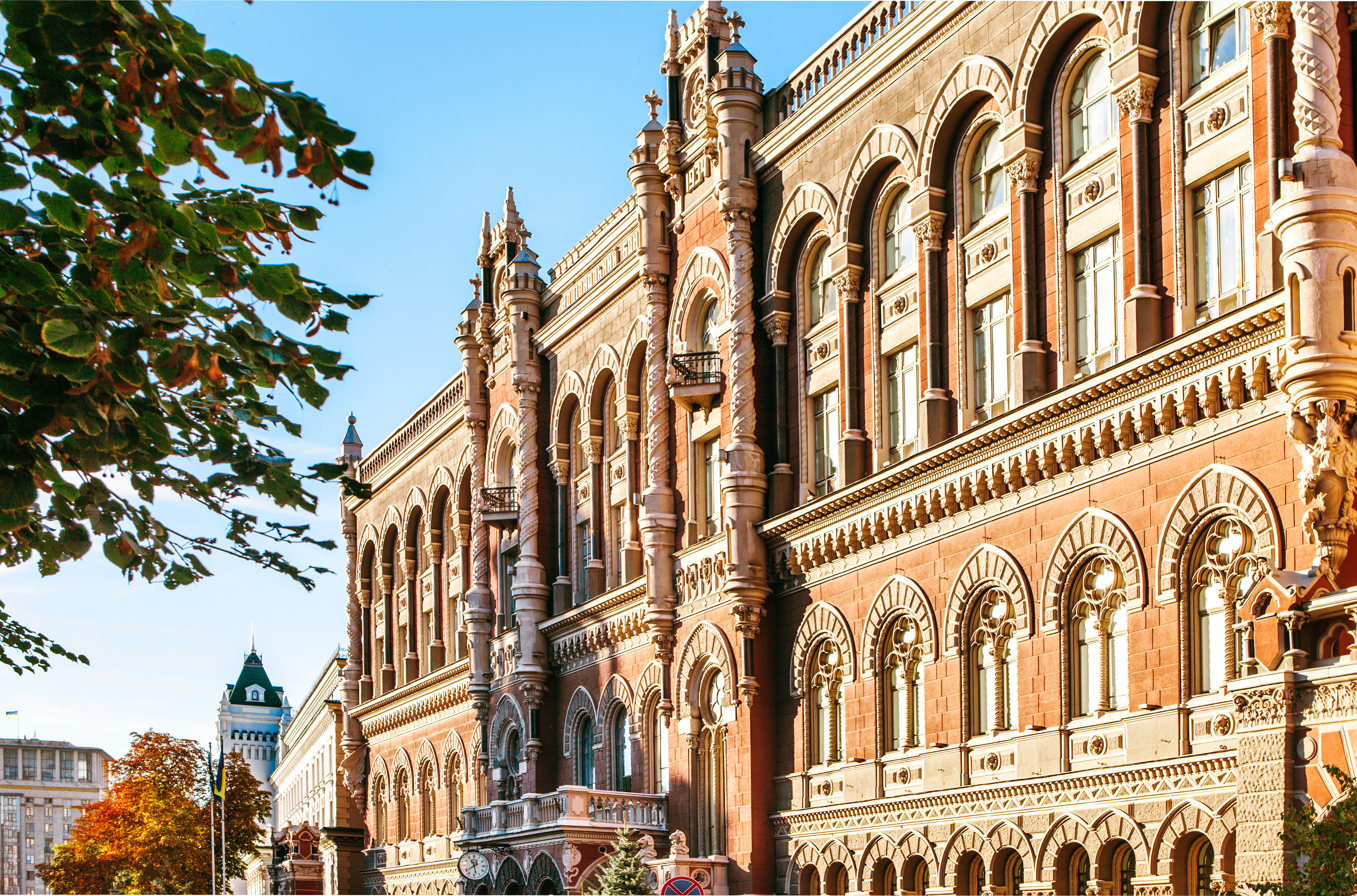
National Bank of Ukraine

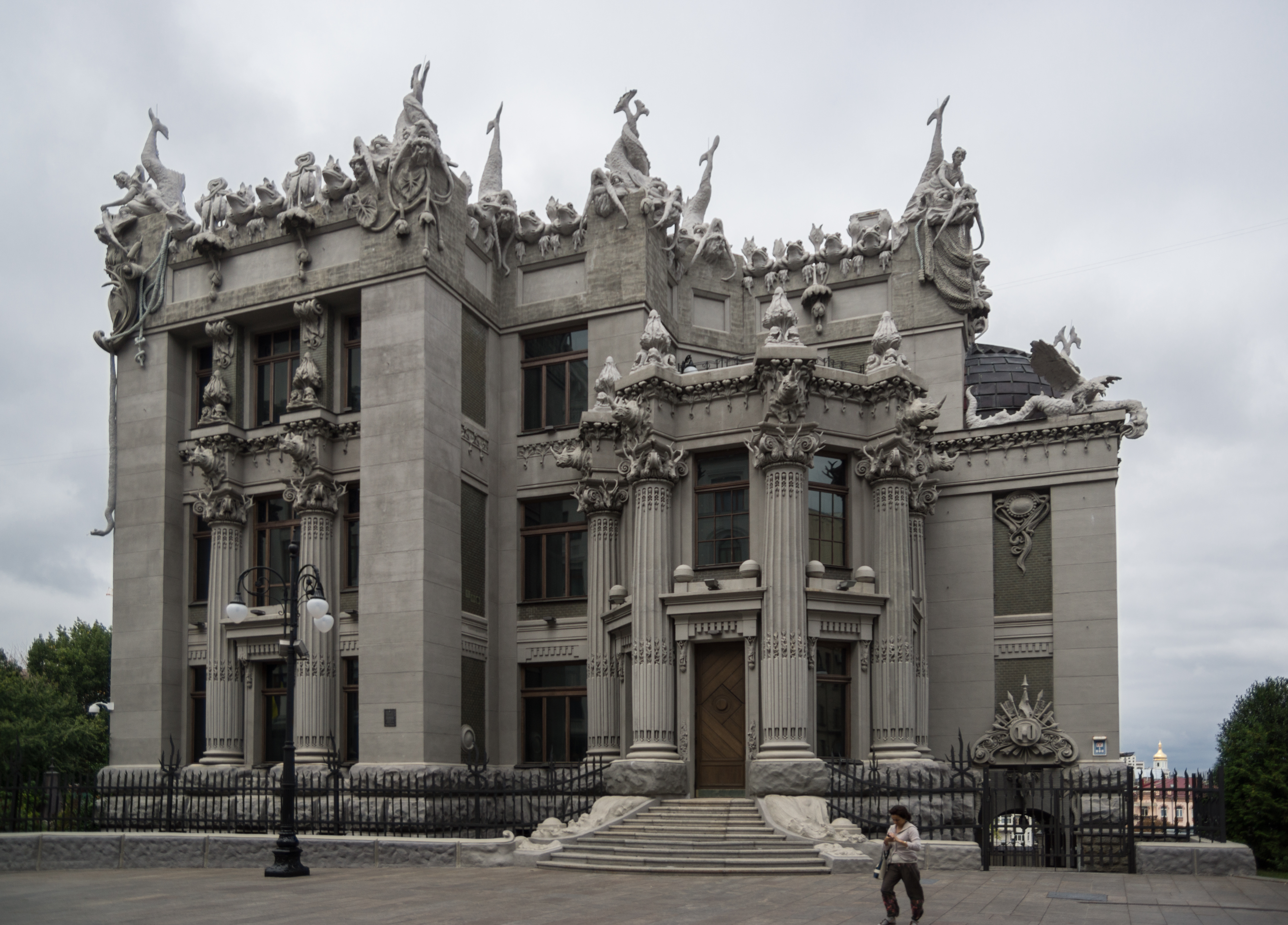
"House with Chimaeras"

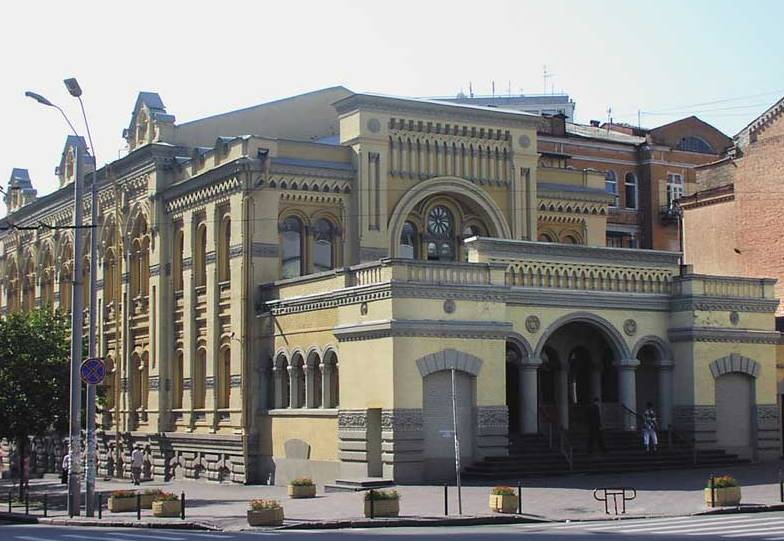
Brodsky Choral Synagogue – Moorish Revival architecture

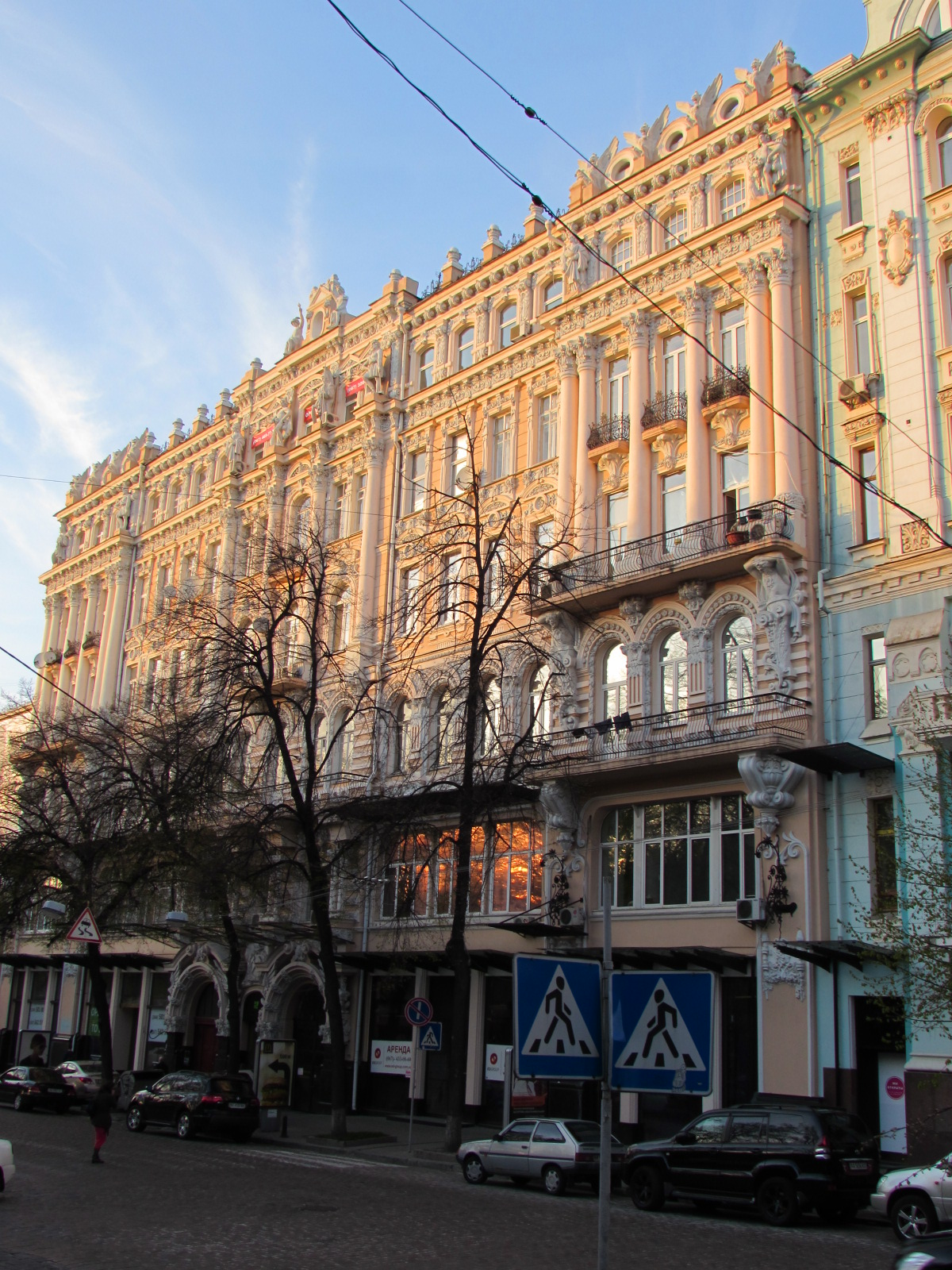
Apartment house in Horodetskoho Street ("Kyivan Paris")

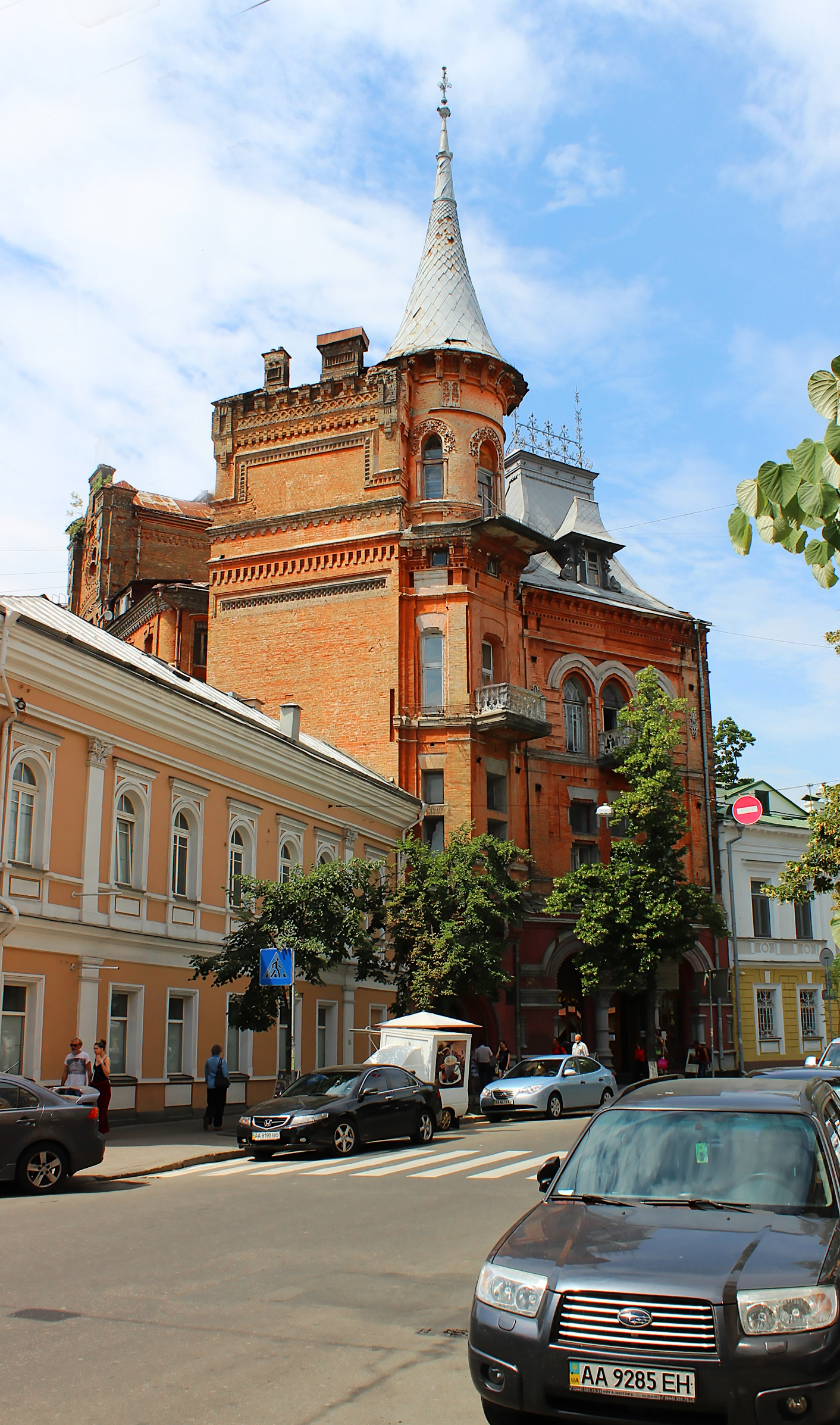
Revenue house in Yaroslaviv Val

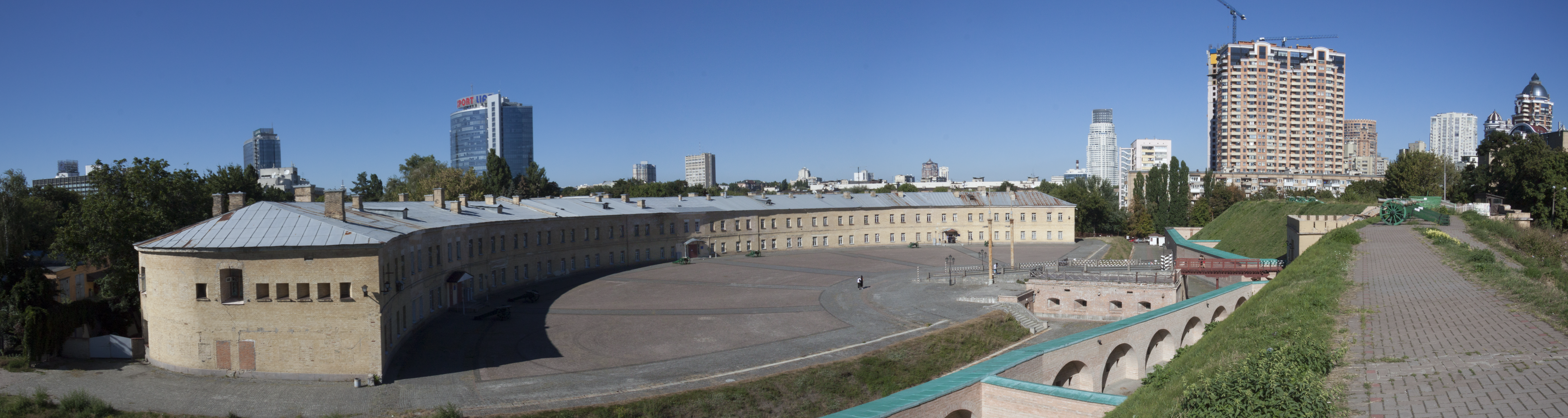
Kyiv Fortress, an example of Imperial Russian military architecture

== Culture ==
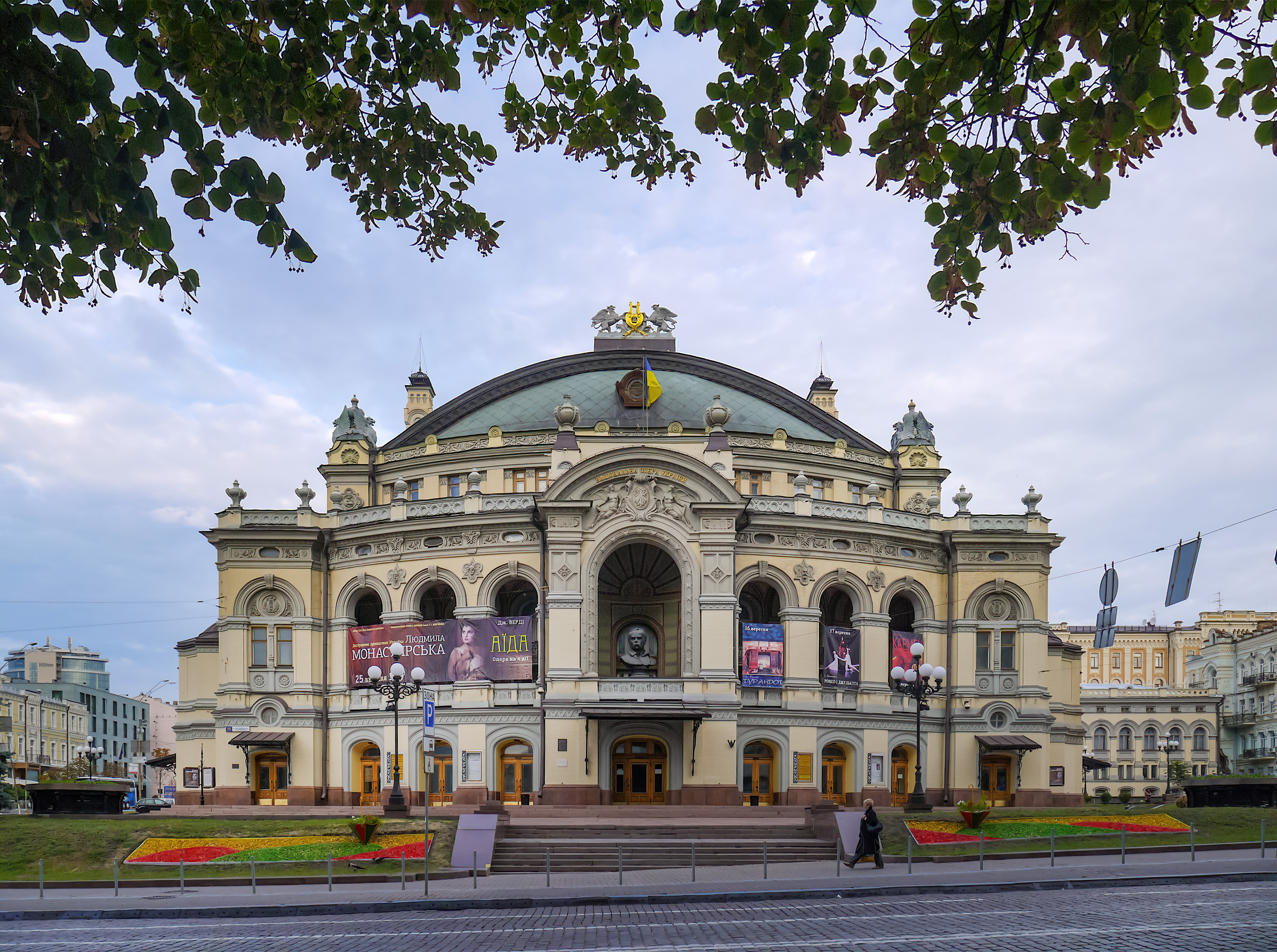
Kyiv National Opera House

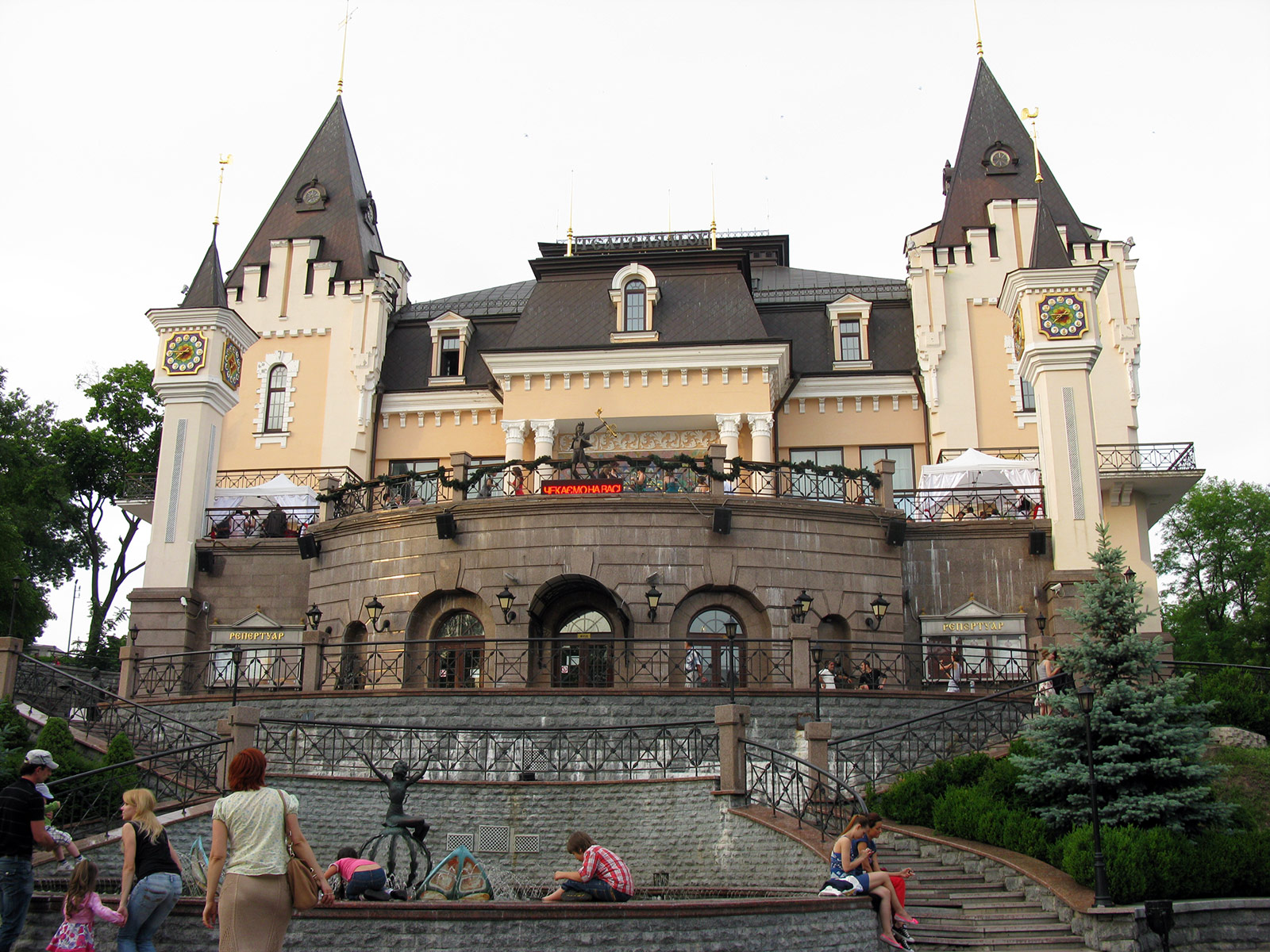
Kyiv Academic Puppet Theatre

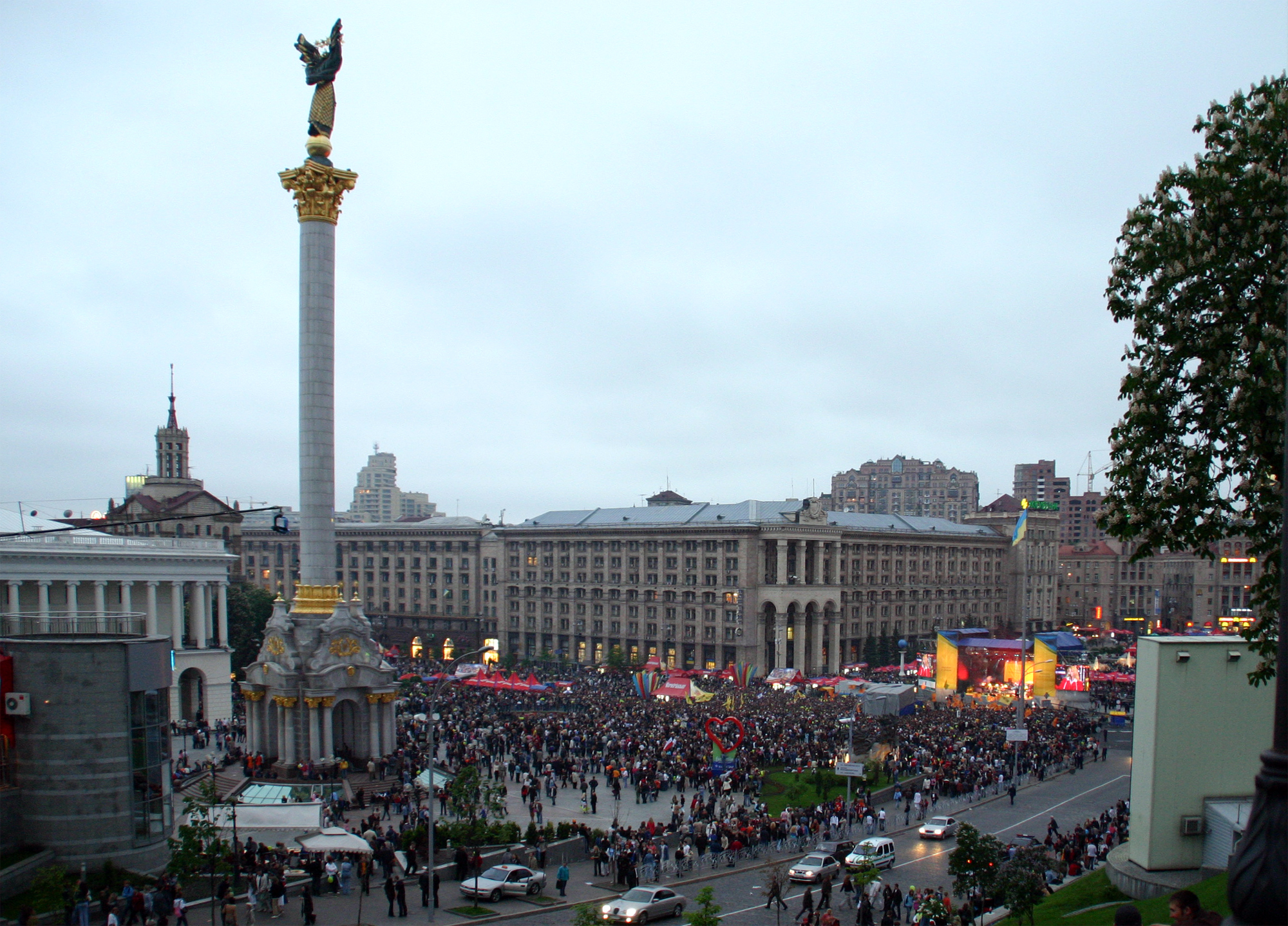
A public concert held on Maidan Nezalezhnosti during Kyiv's 2005 Eurovision Song Contest

Kyiv was the historic cultural centre of the East Slavic civilization and a major cradle for the Christianization of Kievan Rus. Kyiv retained through centuries its cultural importance and even at times of relative decay, it remained the centre of primary importance of Eastern Orthodox Christianity. Its sacred sites of Kyiv Pechersk Lavra (the Monastery of the Caves) and the Saint Sophia Cathedral are attracting pilgrims for centuries and recognized as a UNESCO World Heritage Site, remaining the primary religious centres as well as major tourist attractions. The above-mentioned sites are also part of the Seven Wonders of Ukraine collection.

In September 2023, the UNESCO World Heritage Committee placed the Saint Sophia Cathedral and Kyiv Pechersk Lavra on the List of World Heritage in Danger. According to the committee, although the Ukrainian government has taken action to protect the sites, "optimal conditions are no longer met to fully guarantee the protection of the Outstanding Universal Value of the property and that it is threatened by potential danger due to the war". The list is protected by the 1972 UNESCO Convention, ratified by both Russia and Ukraine. Inclusion on the list is intended to mobilize urgent international support.

Kyiv's theatres include the Kyiv Opera House, Ivan Franko National Academic Drama Theater, Lesya Ukrainka National Academic Theater, the Kyiv Puppet Theater, October Palace, National Philharmonic of Ukraine and others. In 1946 Kyiv had four theatres, one opera house and one concert hall, but most tickets then were allocated to "privileged groups".

Other significant cultural centres include the Dovzhenko Film Studios, and the Kyiv Circus. The most important of the city's many museums are the National Museum of the History of Ukraine, the National Museum of the History of Ukraine in the Second World War, the National Art Museum, the Museum of Western and Oriental Art, the Pinchuk Art Centre, the Kyiv Picture Gallery National Museum, and the Ivan Honchar Museum.

In 2005, Kyiv hosted the 50th annual Eurovision Song Contest and in 2017 the 62nd annual Eurovision Song Contest.

Numerous songs and paintings were dedicated to the city. Some songs became part of Russian, Ukrainian and Jewish folklore. The most popular songs are "How not to love you, Kyiv of mine?" and "Kyiv Waltz". Renowned Ukrainian composer Oleksandr Bilash wrote an operetta called "Legend of Kyiv".

=== Attractions ===
It is said that one can walk from one end of Kyiv to the other in the summertime without leaving the shade of its many trees. Most characteristic are the horse-chestnuts (каштани, kashtany).

Kyiv is known as a green city with two botanical gardens and numerous large and small parks. The National Museum of the History of Ukraine in the Second World War is here, which offers both indoor and outdoor displays of military history and equipment surrounded by verdant hills overlooking the Dnieper river.

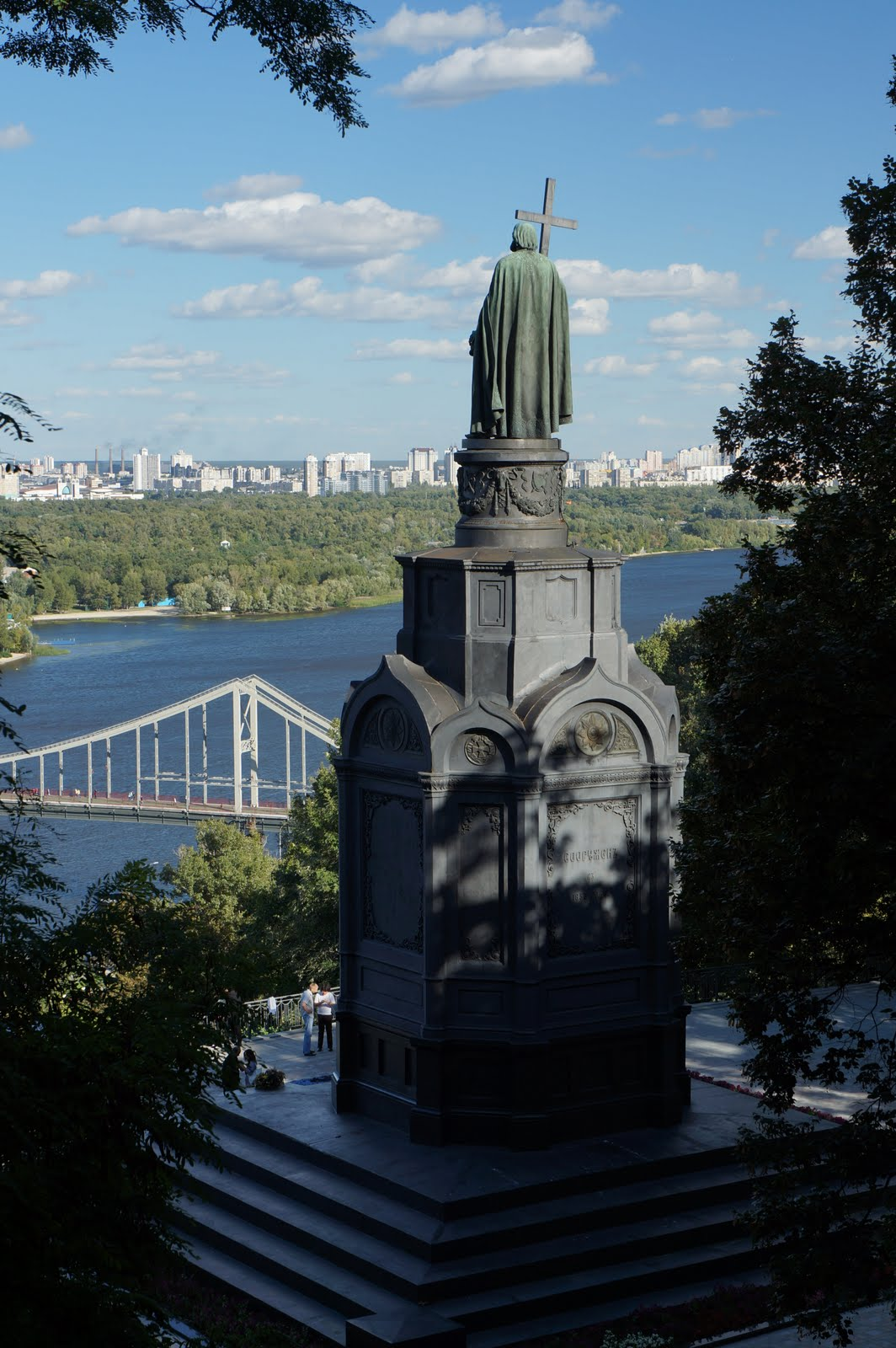
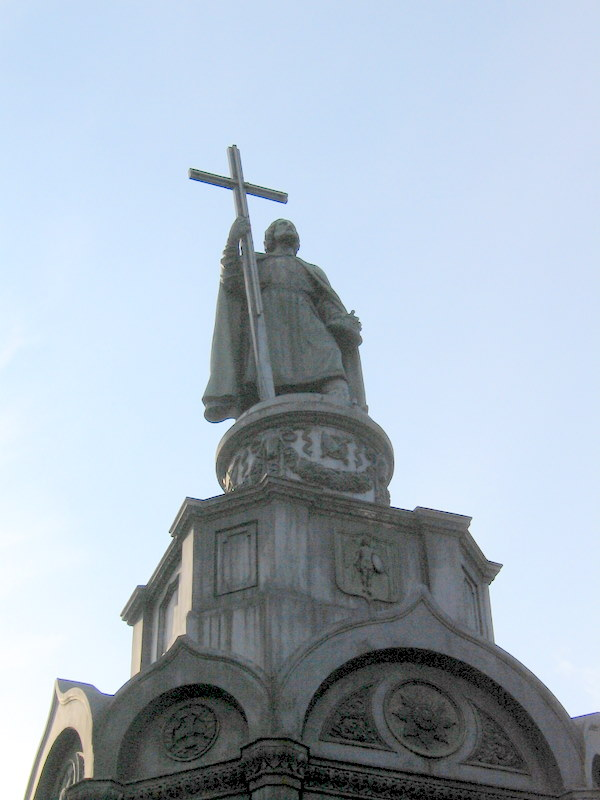
The monument to St. Volodymyr, the Baptiser of Rus', overlooking from Saint Vladimir Hill the scenic panorama of the left bank of Dnieper, is one of the symbols of Kyiv, often depicted in paintings and photographic works of the city.

Among the numerous islands, Venetsiiskyi (or Hydropark) is the most developed. It is accessible by metro or by car, and includes an amusement park, swimming beaches, boat rentals, and night clubs. Other major islands include Trukhaniv, Muromets, and Dolobetskyi. The Victory Park (Park Peremohy) near Darnytsia subway station is a popular destination for strollers, joggers, and cyclists. Boating, fishing, and water sports are popular pastimes in Kyiv. The area lakes and rivers freeze over in the winter and ice fishermen are a frequent sight, as are children with their ice skates. However, the peak of summer draws out a greater mass of people to the shores for swimming or sunbathing, with daytime high temperatures sometimes reaching 30 to 34 °C (86 to 93 °F).

The centre of Kyiv (Maidan Nezalezhnosti and Khreshchatyk Street) becomes a large outdoor party place at night during summer months, with thousands of people having a good time in nearby restaurants, clubs and outdoor cafes. The central streets are closed for auto traffic on weekends and holidays. Andriivskyi Descent is one of the best known historic streets and a major tourist attraction in Kyiv. The hill is the site of the Castle of Richard the Lionheart; the baroque-style St Andrew's Church; the home of the Kyiv-born writer Mikhail Bulgakov; the monument to Yaroslav the Wise, the Grand Prince of Kyiv and Novgorod; and numerous other monuments.

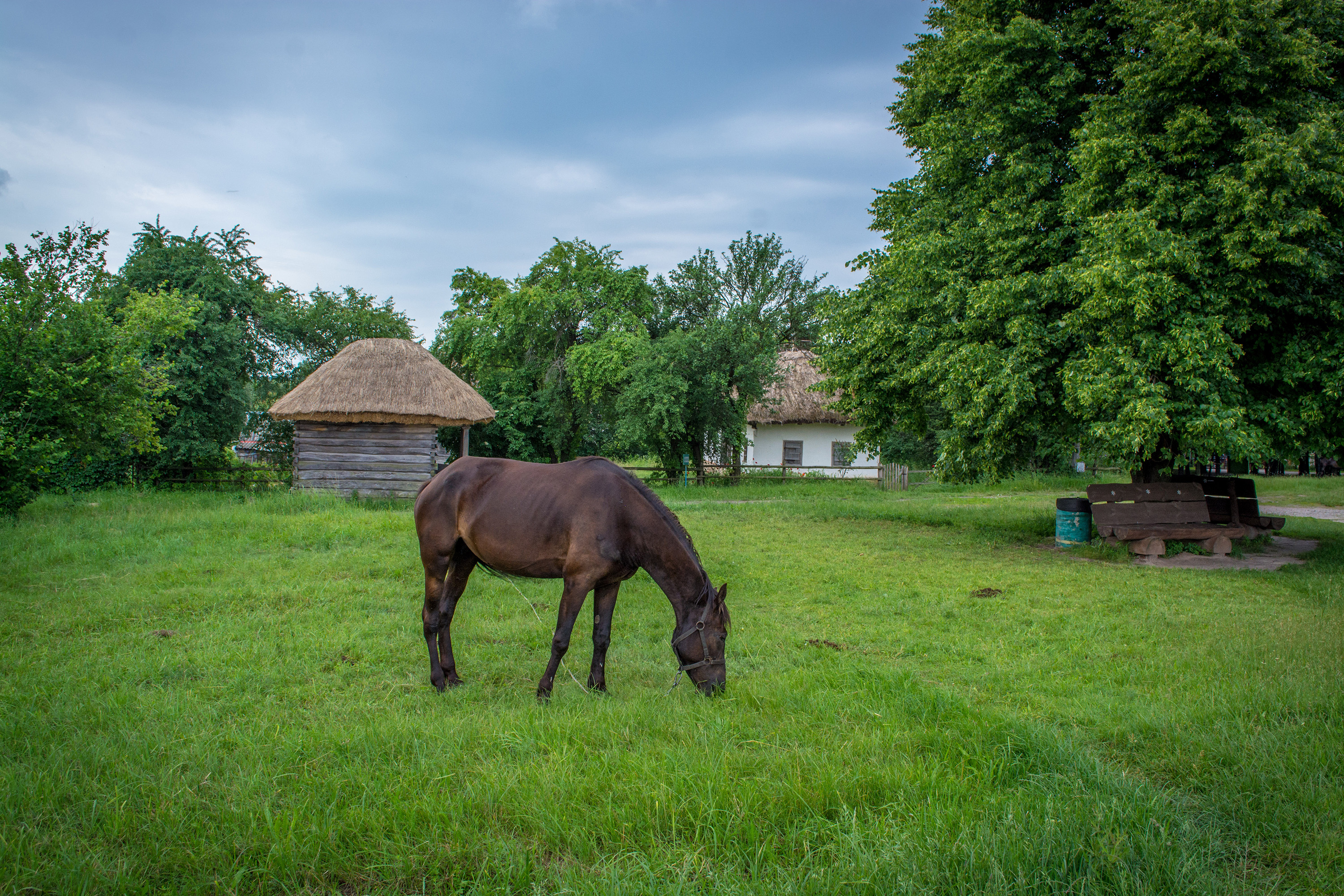
Pyrohiv open-air museum

A wide variety of farm produce is available in many of Kyiv's farmer markets with the Bessarabskyi Market in the very centre of the city being most famous. Each residential region has its own market, or rynok. Here one will find table after table of individuals hawking everything imaginable: vegetables, fresh and smoked meats, fish, cheese, honey, dairy products such as milk and home-made smetana (sour cream), caviar, cut flowers, housewares, tools and hardware, and clothing. Each of the markets has its own unique mix of products with some markets devoted solely to specific wares such as automobiles, car parts, pets, clothing, flowers, and other things.

At the city's southern outskirts, near the historic Pyrohiv village, there is an outdoor museum officially called the Museum of Folk Architecture and Life of Ukraine. It has an area of 1.5 square kilometres (1 sq mi). This territory houses several "mini-villages" that represent by region the traditional rural architecture of Ukraine.

Kyiv also has numerous recreational attractions like bowling alleys, go-cart tracks, paintball venues, billiard halls and even shooting ranges. The 100-year-old Kyiv Zoo is on 40 hectares and according to CBC "the zoo has 2,600 animals from 328 species".

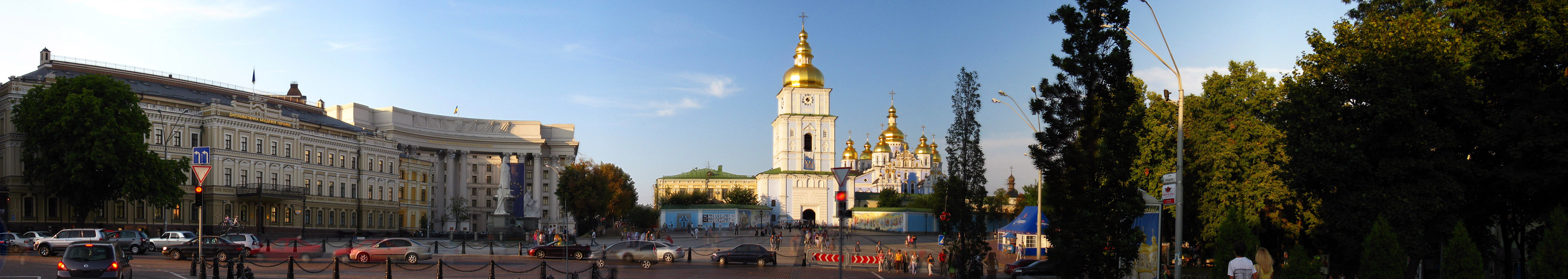
A panoramic view of Mykhailivska Square (central Kyiv). From left to right: the Diplomatic Academy, Ministry of Foreign Affairs (behind the monument to Princess Olga) and St. Michael's Golden-Domed Monastery.

=== Museums and galleries ===
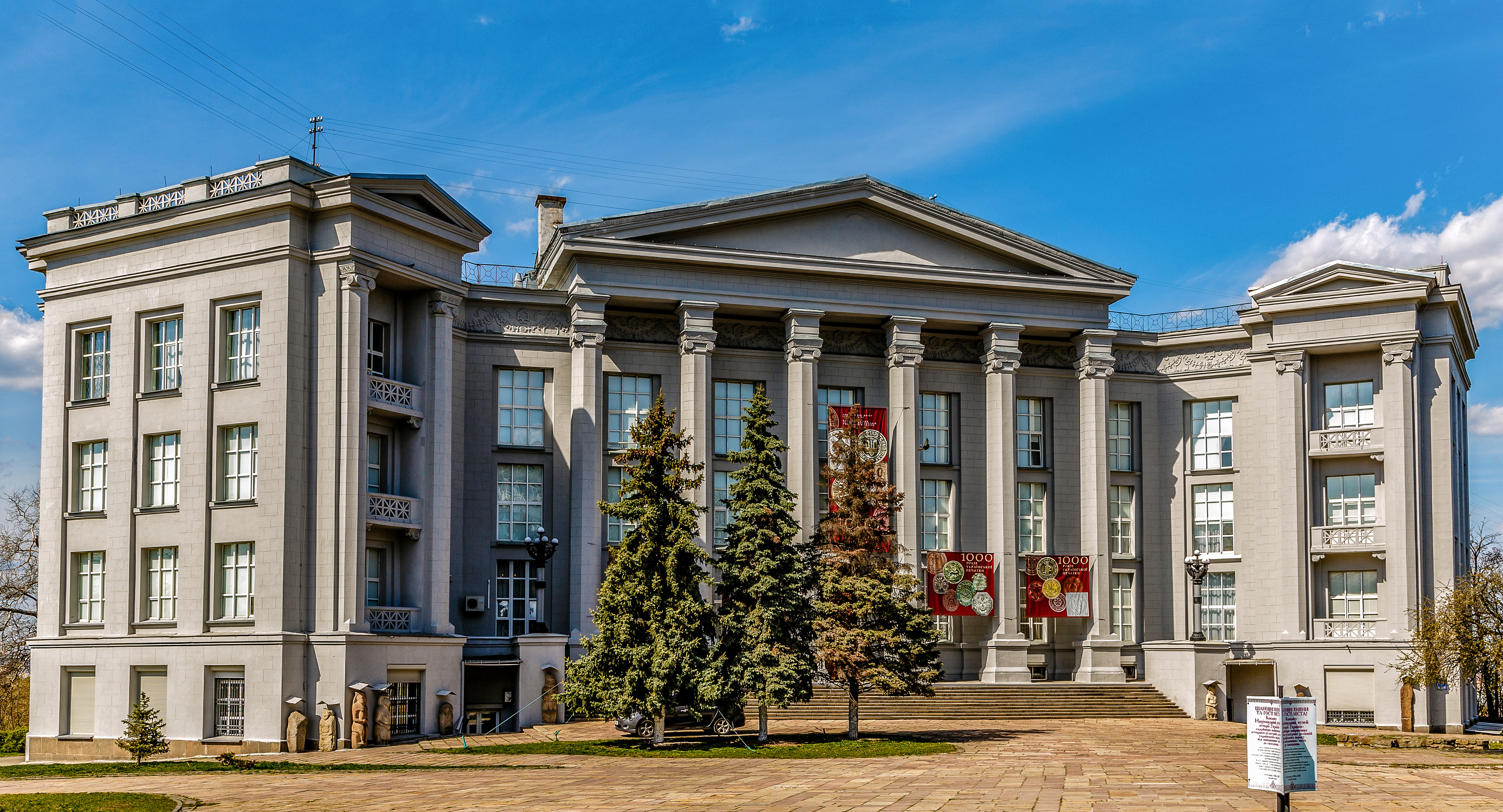
The National Historical Museum of Ukraine

Kyiv is home to some 40 different museums. In 2009 they recorded a total of 4.3 million visits.

The National Museum of the History of Ukraine in the Second World War is a memorial complex commemorating the Eastern Front of World War II in the hills on the right-bank of the Dnieper in Pechersk. Kyiv Fortress is the 19th-century fortification buildings situated in Ukrainian capital Kyiv, that once belonged to western Russian fortresses. These structures (once a united complex) were built in the Pechersk and neighbourhoods by the Russian army. Some of the buildings are restored and turned into a museum, while others are in use in various military and commercial installations.

The National Art Museum of Ukraine is a museum dedicated to Ukrainian art. The Golden Gate is a historic gateway in the ancient city's walls. The name Zoloti Vorota (Golden Gate) is also used for a nearby theatre and a station of the Kyiv Metro. The small Ukrainian National Chernobyl Museum acts as both a memorial and historical center devoted to the events surrounding the 1986 Chernobyl disaster and its effect on the Ukrainian people, the environment, and subsequent attitudes toward the safety of nuclear power as a whole.

=== Sports ===
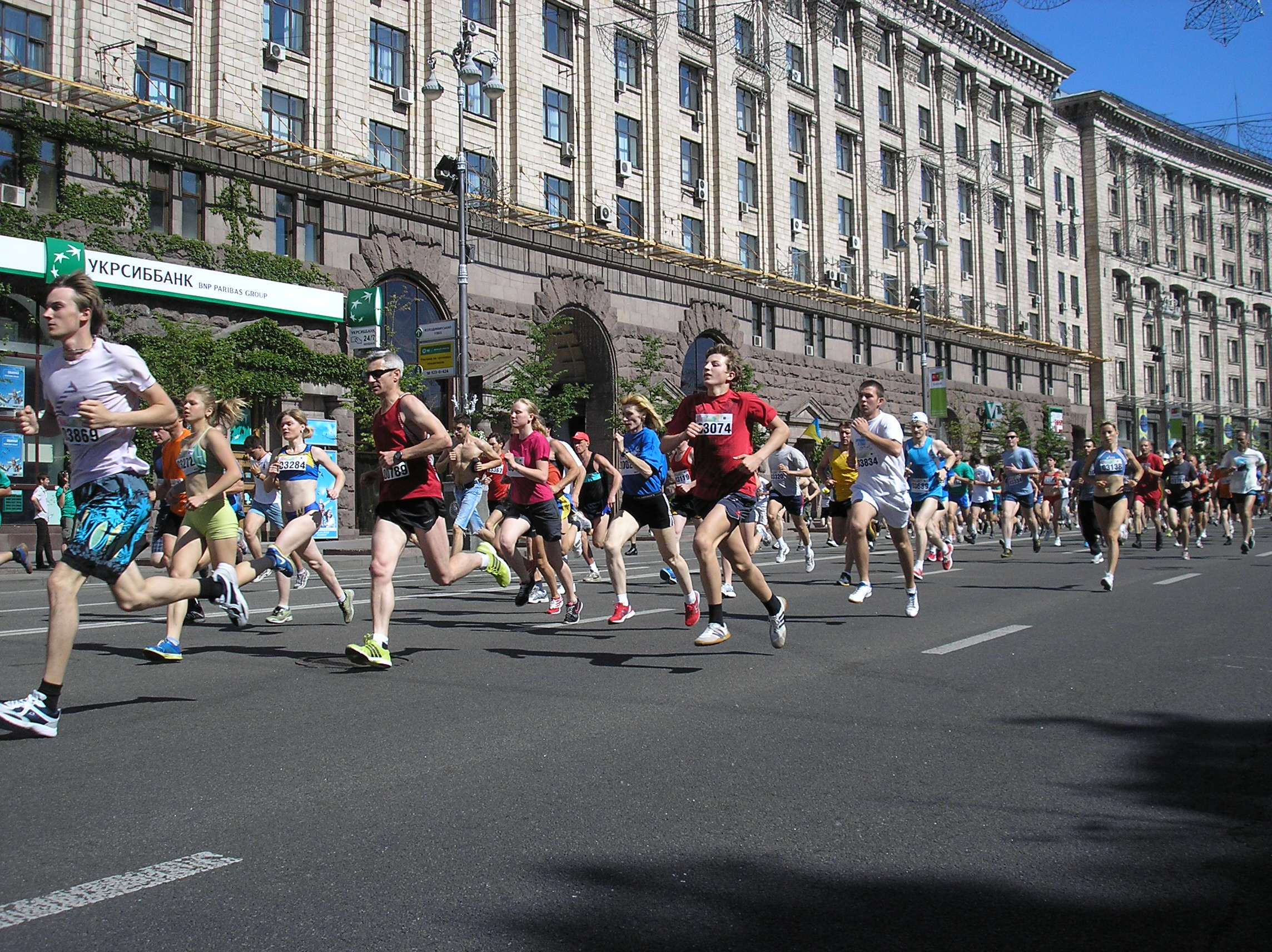
The annual 5.5-kilometre (3.4-mile) "Run under the Chestnuts" is a popular public sporting event in Kyiv, with hundreds taking part every year.

Kyiv has many professional and amateur football clubs, including FC Dynamo Kyiv, FC Obolon Kyiv, FC CSKA Kyiv, FC Arsenal Kyiv, FC Livyi Bereh Kyiv, FC Lokomotyv Kyiv, FC Atlet Kyiv and FC Rebel Kyiv, but only Dynamo Kyiv and Obolon Kyiv play in the Ukrainian Premier League. Of these clubs, Dynamo Kyiv has had the most success over the course of its history. For example, up until the collapse of the Soviet Union in 1991, the club won 13 USSR Championships, 9 USSR Cups, and 3 USSR Super Cups, thus making Dynamo the most successful club in the history of the Soviet Top League.

Other prominent non-football sport clubs in the city include: the Sokil Kyiv ice hockey club and BC Budivelnyk basketball club. Both of these teams play in the highest Ukrainian leagues for their respective sports. Budivelnyk was founded in 1945, Sokil was founded in 1963, during the existence of the Soviet Union. Both these teams play their home games at the Kyiv Palace of Sports.

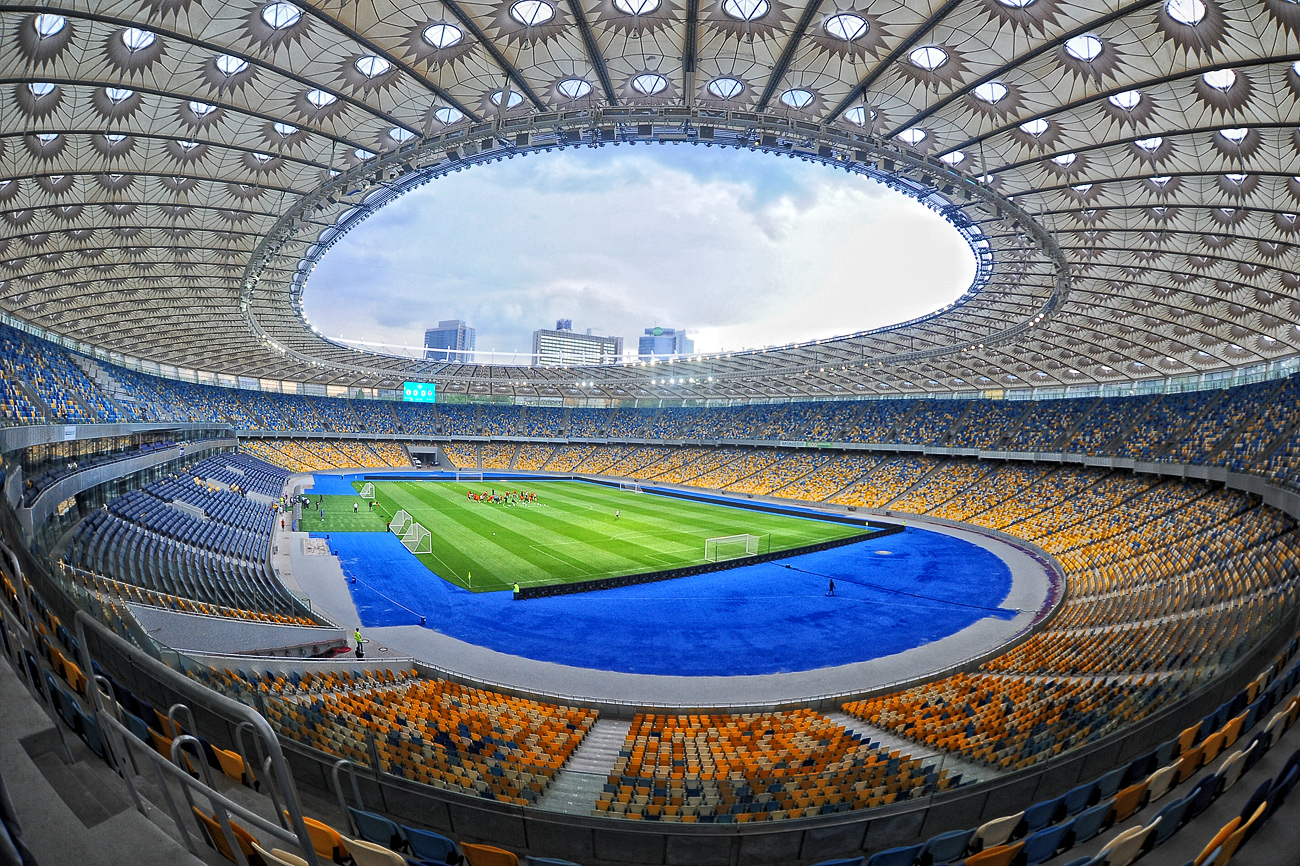
Olimpiyskiy National Sports Complex

During the 1980 Summer Olympics held in the Soviet Union, Kyiv held the preliminary matches and the quarter-finals of the football tournament at its Olympic Stadium, which was reconstructed specially for the event. From 1 December 2008, the stadium underwent a full-scale reconstruction in order to satisfy standards put in place by UEFA for hosting the Euro 2012 football tournament; the opening ceremony took place in the presence of president Viktor Yanukovych on 8 October 2011, with the first major event being a Shakira concert which was specially planned to coincide with the stadium's re-opening during Euro 2012. Other notable sport stadiums/sport complexes in Kyiv include the Valeriy Lobanovskyi Dynamo Stadium, the Palace of Sports, among many others.

Most Ukrainian national teams play their home international matches in Kyiv. The Ukraine national football team, for example, will play matches at the re-constructed Olympic Stadium from 2011.

=== Tourism ===
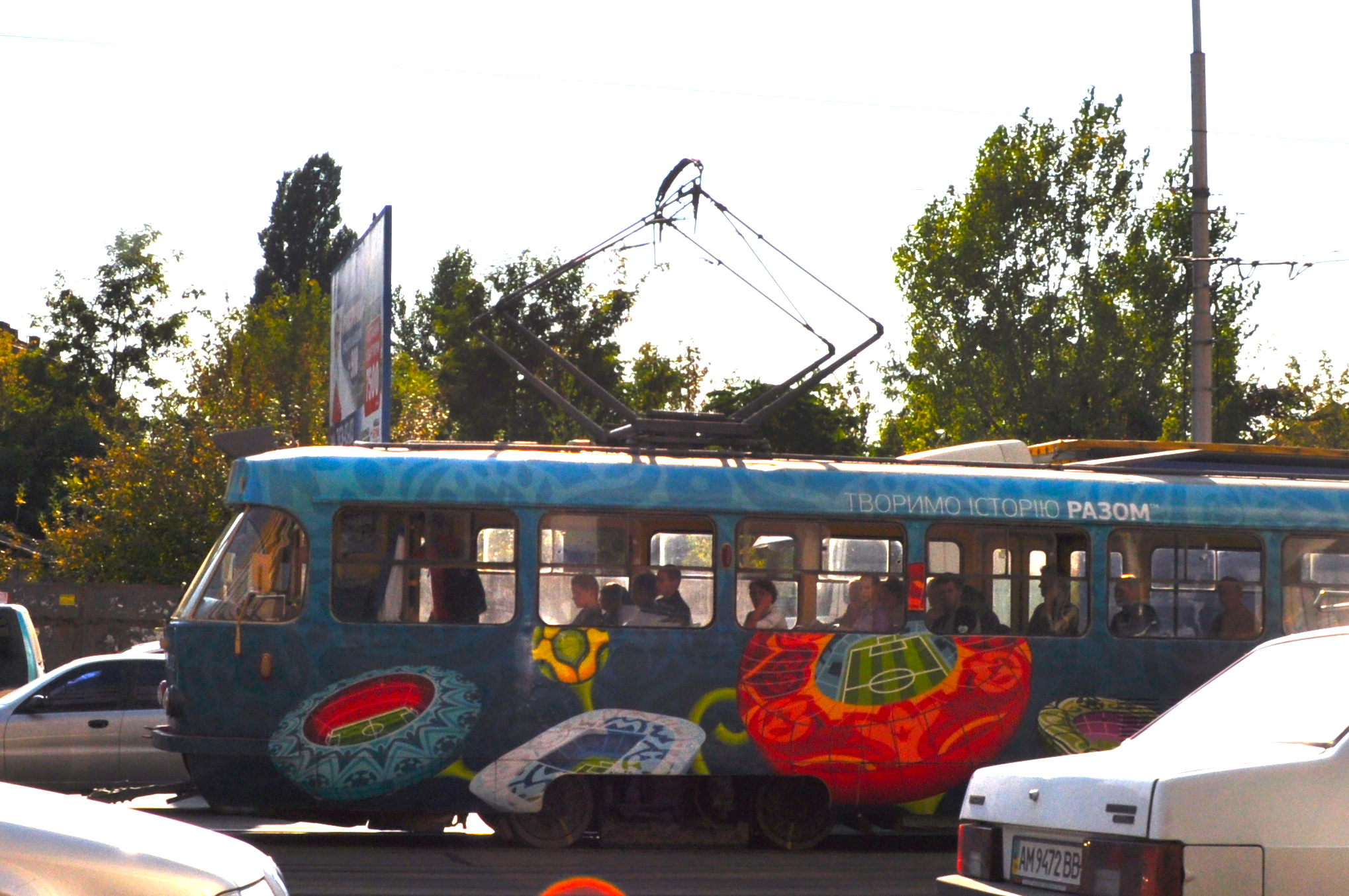
A Kyiv tram carrying the colours of UEFA Euro 2012 football championship

Since introducing a visa-free regime for EU-member states and Switzerland in 2005, Ukraine has seen a steady increase in the number of foreign tourists visiting the country. Before the 2008–2009 Ukrainian financial crisis, the average annual growth in the number of foreign visits in Kyiv was 23% over a three-year period. In 2009, a total of 1.6 million tourists stayed in Kyiv hotels, of whom almost 259,000 (c. 16%) were foreigners.

After UEFA Euro 2012, the city became a popular destination for European tourists. A record number of 1.8 million foreign tourists was registered then along with about 2.5 million domestic tourists. More than 850,000 foreign tourists visited Kyiv in the first half of 2018, as compared to 660,000 tourists over the same period in 2013. As of 2018, the hotel occupancy rate from May to September averages 45–50%. Hostels and three-star hotels are approximately 90% full, four-star hotels 65–70%. Six five-star hotels average 50–55% occupancy. Ordinary tourists generally come from May to October, and business tourists from September to May.

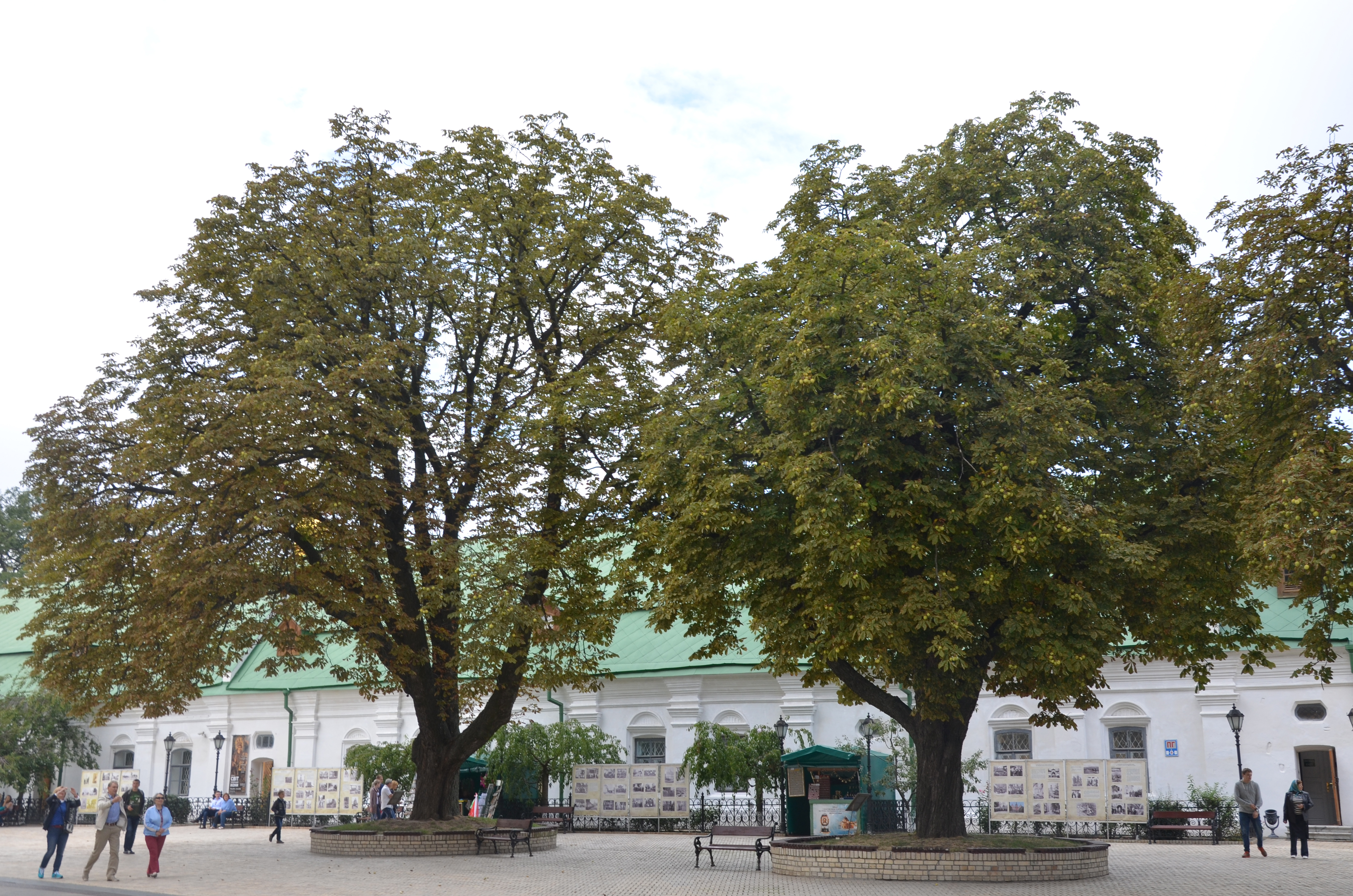
Lime and horse chestnut trees in Kyiv Pechersk Lavra

=== City anthem ===
In 2014, the Kyiv city's council established the city's anthem. It became a 1962 song, "Yak tebe ne liubyty, Kyieve mii!" (Як тебе не любити, Києве мій!, roughly "How can I not love you, Kyiv of mine!").

=== City symbols ===
The horse chestnut tree is one of the symbols of Kyiv. It was heavily present on the city's coat of arms used from 1969 to 1995.

== Economy ==
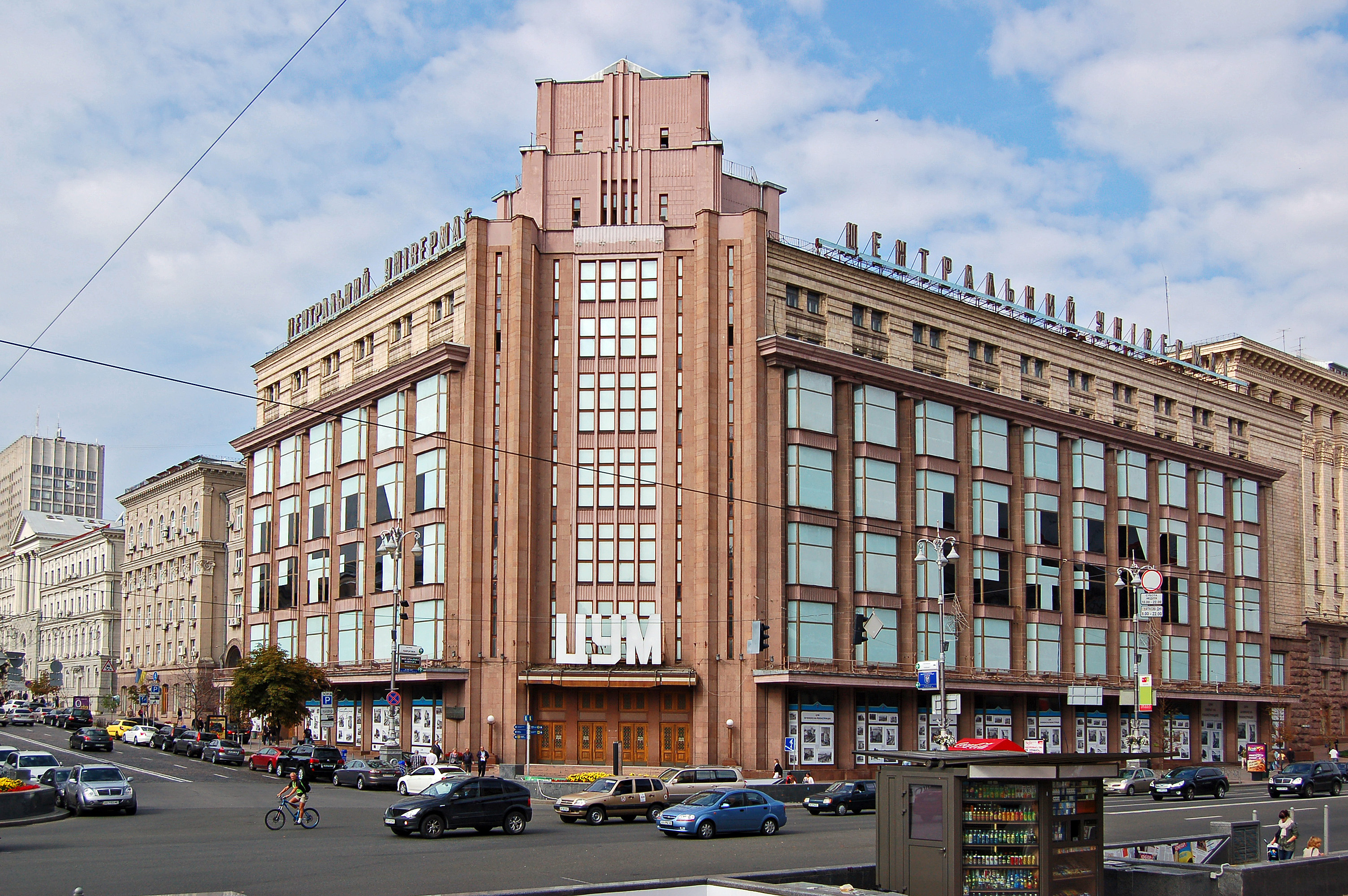
The TsUM department store

As with most capital cities, Kyiv is a major administrative, cultural, and scientific centre of the country. It is the largest city in Ukraine in terms of both population and area and enjoys the highest levels of business activity. On 1 January 2010, there were around 238,000 business entities registered in Kyiv.

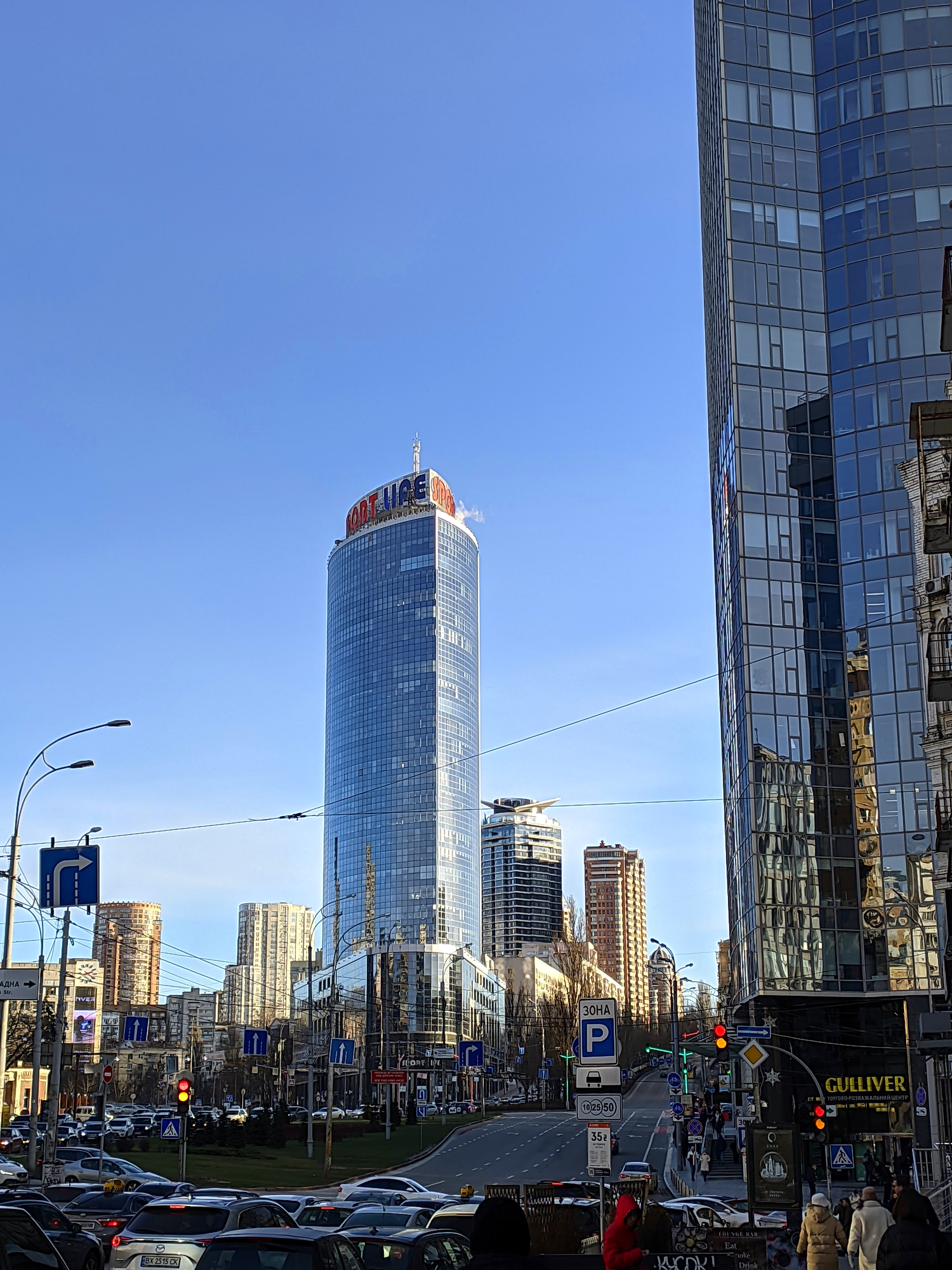
Office buildings in Lesya Ukrainka Boulevard

Official figures show that between 2004 and 2008 Kyiv's economy outstripped the rest of the country's, growing by an annual average of 11.5%. Following the Great Recession, Kyiv's economy suffered a severe setback in 2009 with gross regional product contracting by 13.5% in real terms. Although a record high, the decline in activity was 1.6 percentage points smaller than that for the country as a whole. The economy in Kyiv, as in the rest of Ukraine, recovered somewhat in 2010 and 2011. Kyiv is a middle-income city, with prices comparable to many mid-size American cities (i.e., considerably lower than Western Europe).

Because the city has a large and diverse economic base and is not dependent on any single industry or company, its unemployment rate has historically been relatively low – only 3.75% over 2005–2008. Indeed, even as the rate of joblessness jumped to 7.1% in 2009, it remained far below the national average of 9.6%.

As of January 2022, the average monthly salary in Kyiv reached 21,347 UAH (€540) gross and 17,184 UAH (€430) net.

Kyiv is the undisputed center of business and commerce of Ukraine and home to the country's largest companies, such as Naftogaz Ukrainy, Energorynok and Kyivstar. In 2010, the city accounted for 18% of national retail sales and 24% of all construction activity. Real estate is one of the major forces in Kyiv's economy. Average prices of apartments are the highest in the country and among the highest in eastern Europe. Kyiv also ranks high in terms of commercial real estate and has Ukraine's tallest office buildings (such as Gulliver and Parus) and some of Ukraine's biggest shopping malls (such as Dream Town and Ocean Plaza).

In May 2011, Kyiv authorities presented a 15-year development strategy which calls for attracting as much as EUR82 billion of foreign investment by 2025 to modernize the city's transport and utilities infrastructure and make it more attractive for tourists.

Historical economic data
| | 2004 | 2005 | 2006 | 2007 | 2008 | 2009 | 2010 | 2011 | 2012 | 2013 | 2014 | 2015 | 2016 | 2017 | 2018 | 2019 | 2020 | 2021 |
|---|---|---|---|---|---|---|---|---|---|---|---|---|---|---|---|---|---|---|
| Nominal GRP (UAH bn) | 61.4 | 77.1 | 95.3 | 135.9 | 169.6 | 169.5 | 196.6 | 223.8 | 275.7 | 312.6 | 357.4 | 451.7 | 559.1 | 699.4 | 833.3 | 949.6 | 1014.7 | 1276.4 |
| Nominal GRP (USD bn)** | 11.5 | 15.0 | 18.9 | 26.9 | 32.2 | 21.8 | 24.8 | 28.0 | 34.5 | 39.1 | 30.1 | 20.7 | 21.9 | 26.3 | 30.6 | 36.7 | 37.6 | 46.1 |
| Nominal GRP per capita (USD)** | 4,348 | 5,616 | 6,972 | 9,860 | 11,693 | 7,841 | 8,875 | 10,007 | 12,192 | 13,687 | 10,443 | 7,139 | 7,504 | 8,973 | 10,411 | 12,414 | 12,695 | 15,582 |
| Monthly wage (USD)** | 182 | 259 | 342 | 455 | 584 | 406 | 432 | 504 | 577 | 627 | 452 | 308 | 338 | 419 | 498 | 610 | 634 | 742 |
| Unemployment rate (%)*** | n/a | 4.6 | 3.8 | 3.3 | 3.3 | 7.1 | 6.4 | 6.1 | 6.0 | 5.7 | 7.2 | 7.5 | 7.1 | 7.4 | 6.6 | 6.2 | n/a | n/a |
| Retail sales (UAH bn) | n/a | n/a | n/a | 34.87 | 46.50 | 42.79 | 50.09 | 62.80 | 73.00 | 77.14 | n/a | n/a | n/a | n/a | n/a | n/a | n/a | n/a |
| Retail sales (USD bn) | n/a | n/a | n/a | 6.90 | 8.83 | 5.49 | 6.31 | 7.88 | 9.14 | 9.65 | n/a | n/a | n/a | n/a | n/a | n/a | n/a | n/a |
| Foreign direct investment (USD bn) | 2.1 | 3.0 | 4.8 | 7.0 | 11.7 | 16.8 | 19.2 | 21.8 | 24.9 | 27.3 | n/a | n/a | n/a | n/a | n/a | n/a | n/a | n/a |

* – data not available; ** – calculated at annual average official exchange rate; *** – ILO methodology (% of workforce).

=== Industry ===
Primary industries in Kyiv include utilities – i.e., electricity, gas and water supply (26% of total industrial output), manufacture of food, beverages and tobacco products (22%), chemical (17%), mechanical engineering (13%) and manufacture of paper and paper products, including publishing, printing and reproduction of recorded media (11%). The Institute of Oil Transportation is headquartered here.

==== Notable enterprises ====
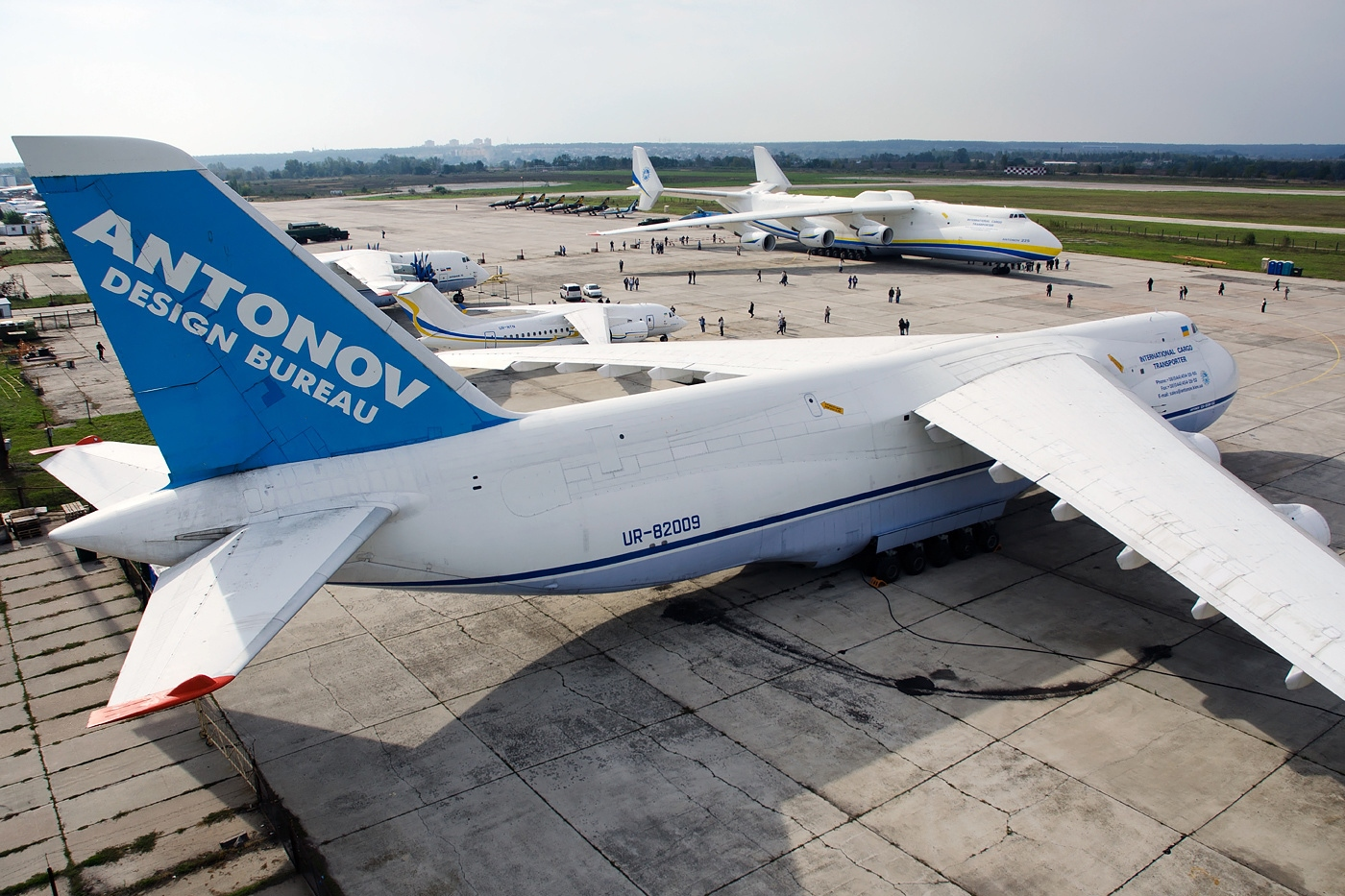
The An-124, the largest aircraft ever mass-produced, designed by Antonov in Kyiv

- Antonov Serial Production Plant (former Aviant), airplanes manufacturing
- Aeros, small aircraft production
- Darnytsia pharmaceutical company
- Farmak pharmaceutical company
- Grammarly software
- Kuznia na Rybalskomu, naval production
- Kyiv Aircraft Repair Plant 410, repair factory at Zhuliany Airport
- Kyiv Arsenal (former arms manufacturer), specializes in production of optic-precision instruments
- Kyiv Roshen Factory, confectionery
- Kyivmiskbud, construction company
- Obolon brewery
- Philip Morris Ukraine, tobacco producer
- Slavutych brewery

== Education and science ==
=== Scientific research ===
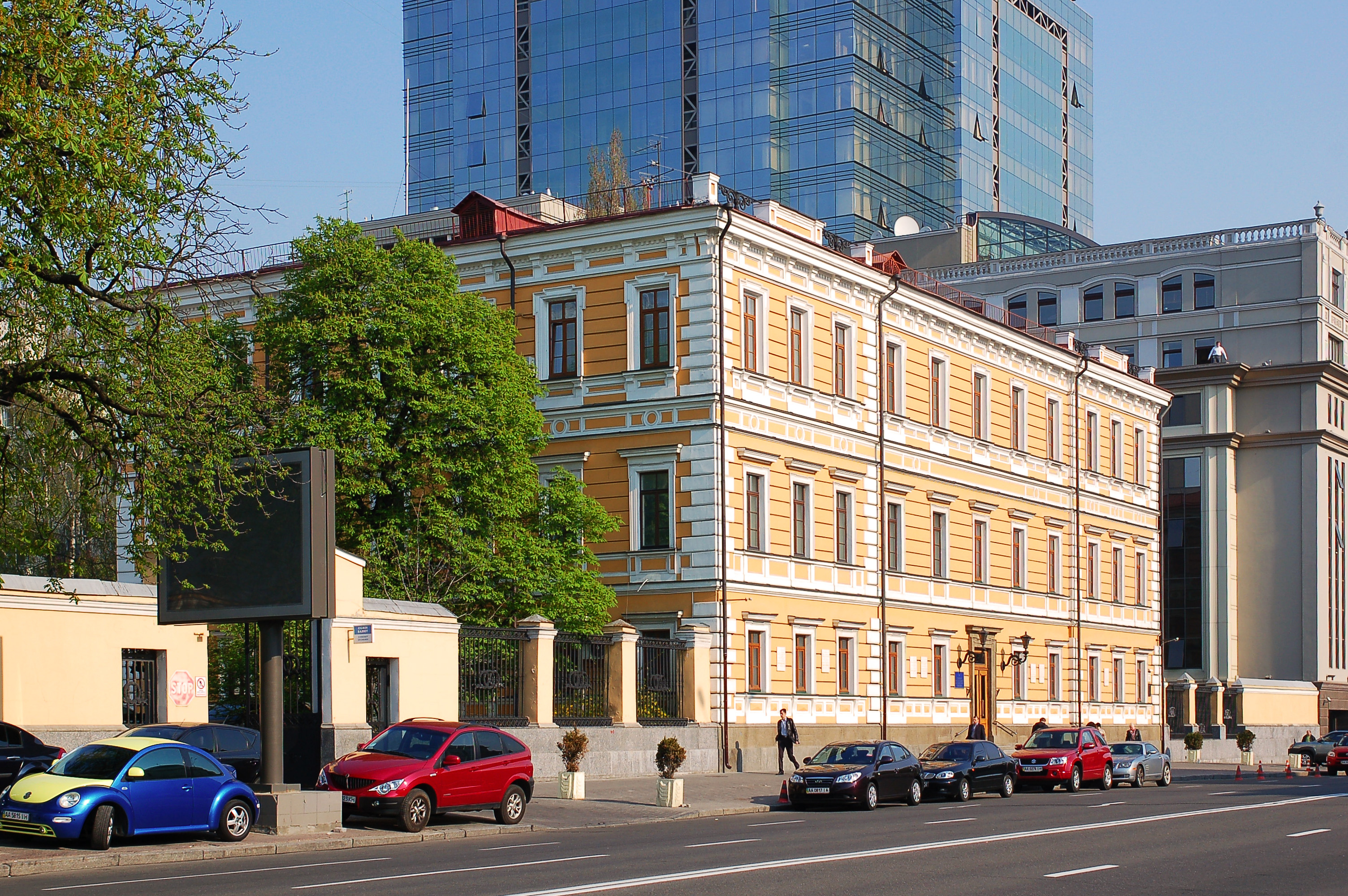
Office of the Ukrainian Academy of Sciences in Kyiv

Scientific research is conducted in many institutes of higher education and, additionally, in many research institutes affiliated with the Ukrainian Academy of Sciences. Kyiv is home to Ukraine's ministry of education and science, and is also noted for its contributions to medical and computer science research.

In 2016, UNIT Factory (Ukrainian National IT Factory) opened. It offers a completely new format of IT education. The education is completely free for all trainees subject to compliance with the terms of the program. Within this project are the Technology Companies' Development Center (TCDC), BIONIC University open inter-corporate IT-university, as well as two hi-tech laboratories—VR Lab (Crytek) and Smart City lab.

=== University education ===
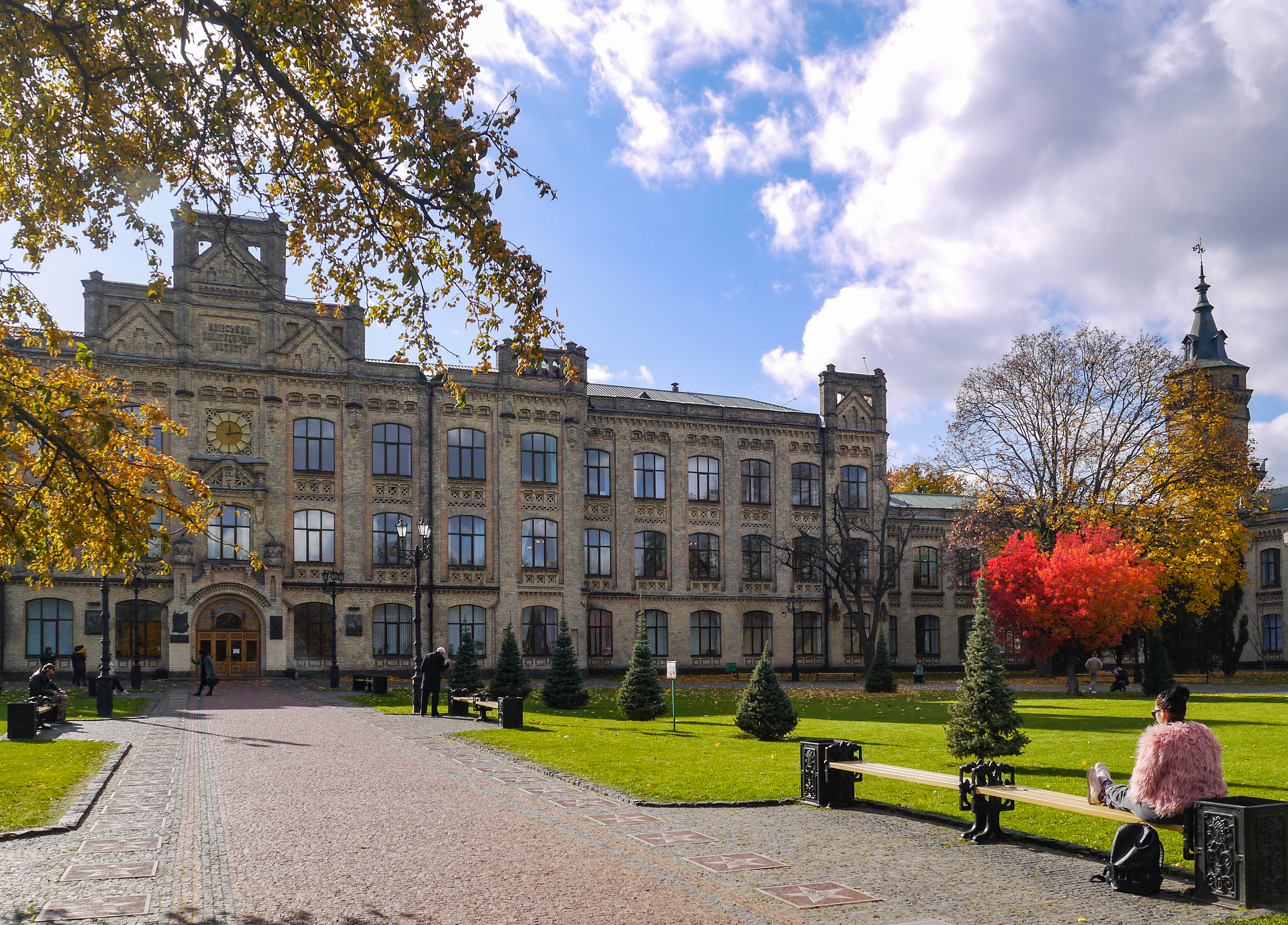
Main building of Kyiv Polytechnic Institute

Kyiv hosts many universities, the major ones being Kyiv National Taras Shevchenko University, the National Technical University "Kyiv Polytechnic Institute", Kyiv-Mohyla Academy and the Kyiv National University of Trade and Economics. Of these, the Mohyla Academy is the oldest, founded as a theological school in 1632, but Shevchenko University, founded in 1834, is the oldest in continuous operation. The total number of institutions of higher education in Kyiv approaches 200, allowing young people to pursue almost any line of study. While education traditionally remains largely in the hands of the state there are several accredited private institutions in the city.

=== Secondary education ===
There are about 530 general secondary schools and about 680 nursery schools and kindergartens in Kyiv. Additionally, there are evening schools for adults, specialist technical schools, and the Evangel Theological Seminary.

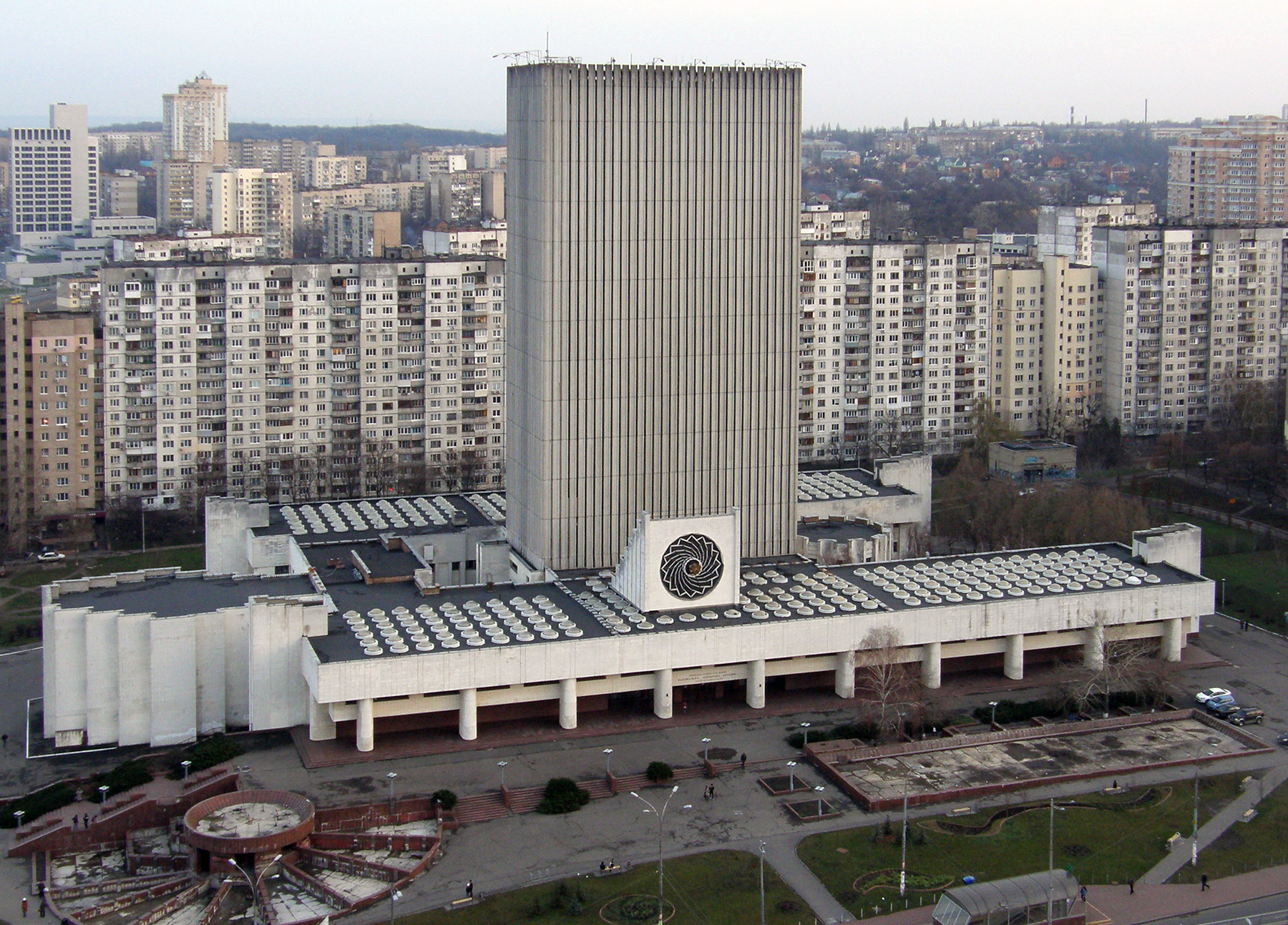
Vernadsky National Library

=== Public libraries ===
There are many libraries in the city, with the Vernadsky National Library, which is Ukraine's main academic library and scientific information centre, as well as one of the world's largest national libraries, being the largest and most important one. The National Library is affiliated with the Academy of Sciences in so far as it is a deposit library and thus serves as the academy's archives' store. The national library is the world's foremost repository of Jewish folk music recorded on Edison wax cylinders. Their Collection of Jewish Musical Folklore (1912–1947) was inscribed on UNESCO's Memory of the World Register in 2005.

== Infrastructure ==
=== Transportation ===
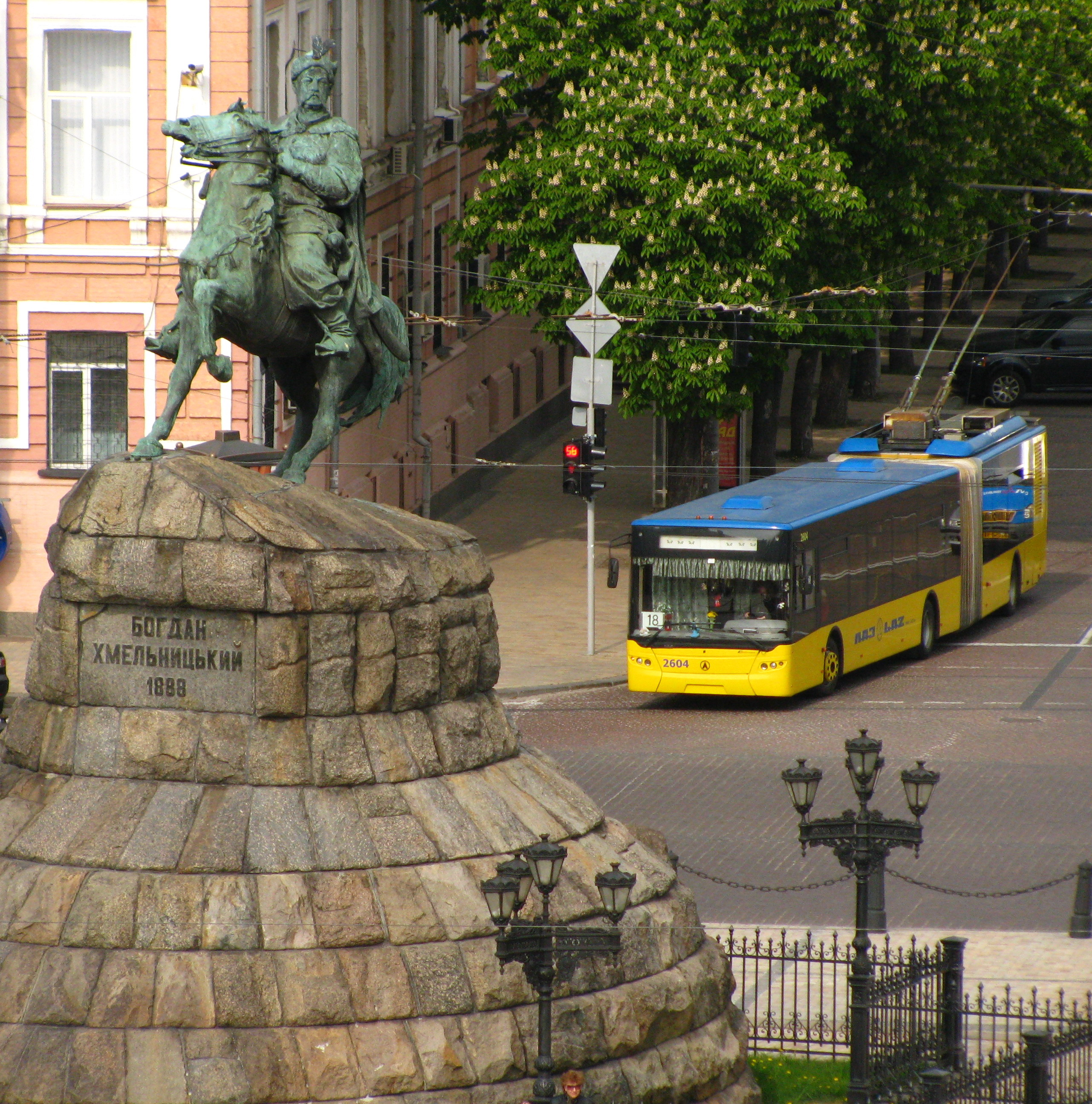
Trolleybus ElektroLAZ-301 at Sofia Square, passing by the statue of Bohdan Khmelnytsky

==== Local public transport ====
Local public transportation in Kyiv includes the Metro, buses and minibuses, trolleybuses, trams, taxi and funicular. There is also an intra-city ring railway service.

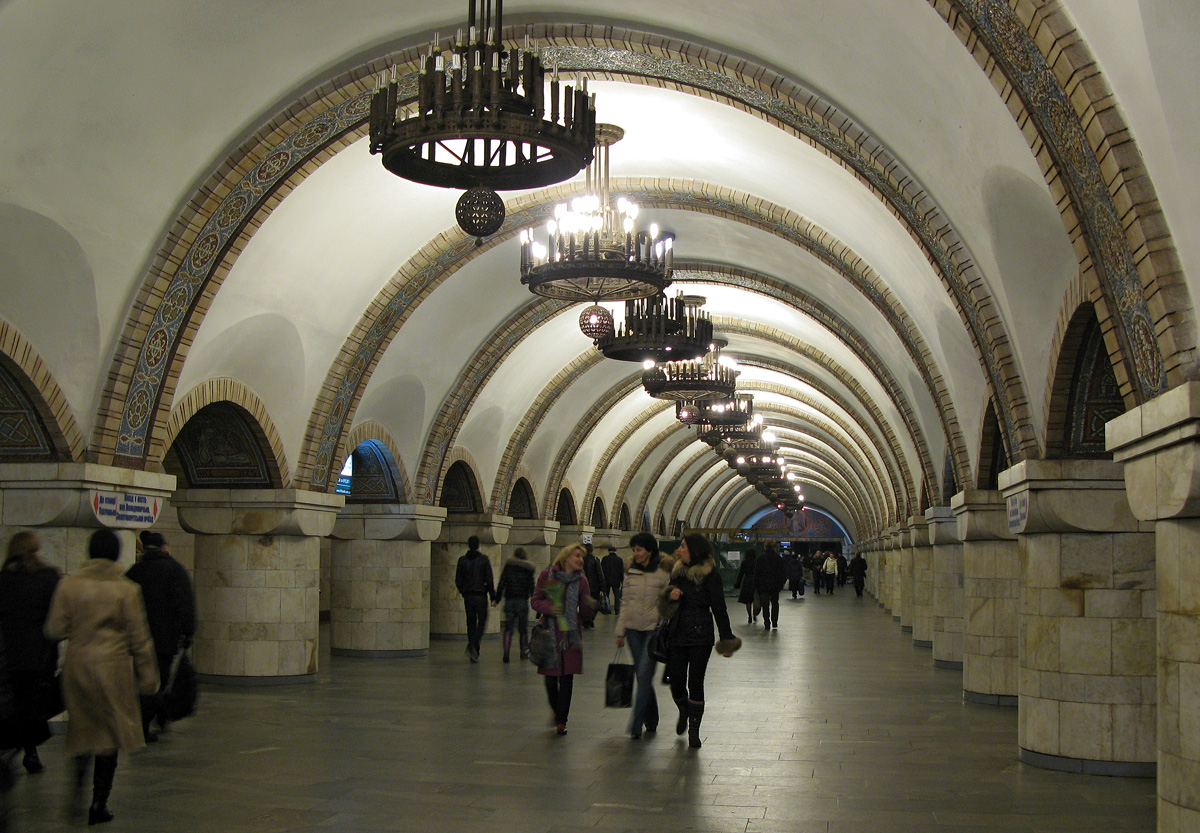
Zoloti Vorota metro station

The publicly owned and operated Kyiv Metro is the fastest, the most convenient and affordable network that covers most, but not all, of the city. The Metro is expanding towards the city limits to meet growing demand, having three lines with a total length of 66.1 kilometres (41.1 miles) and 51 stations (some of which are renowned architectural landmarks). The Metro carries around 1.422 million passengers daily accounting for 38% of the Kyiv's public transport load. In 2011, the total number of trips exceeded 519 million.

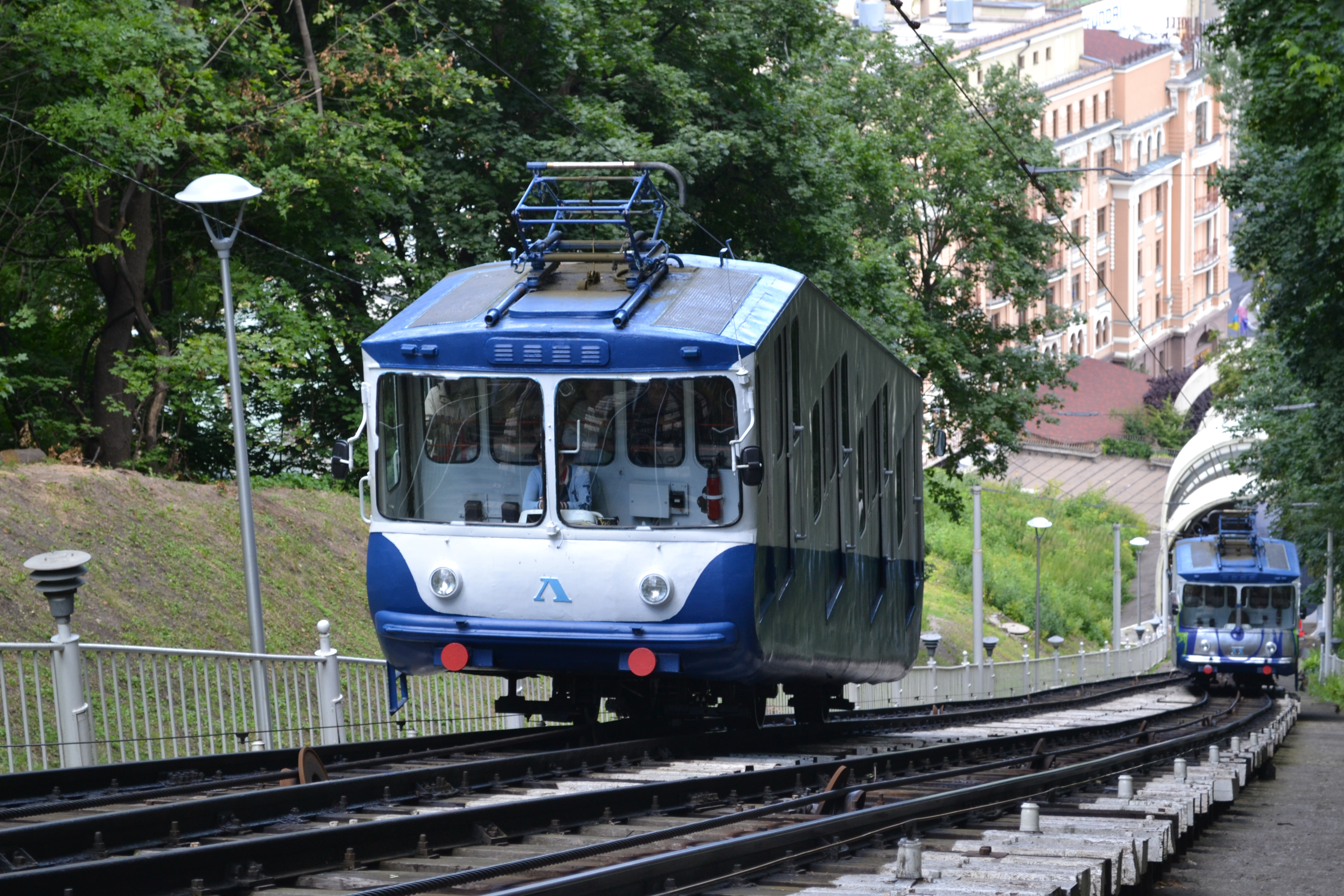
Kyiv Funicular

The historic tram system was the first electric tramway in the former Russian Empire and the third one in Europe after the Berlin Straßembahn and the Budapest tramway. The tram system consists of 139.9 km (86.9 mi) of track, including 14 km (8.7 mi) two Rapid Tram lines, served by 21 routes with the use of 523 tram cars. Once a well maintained and widely used method of transport, the system is now gradually being phased out in favor of buses and trolleybuses.

The Kyiv Funicular was constructed during 1902–1905. It connects the historic Uppertown, and the lower commercial neighborhood of Podil through the steep Saint Volodymyr Hill overseeing the Dnieper River. The line consists of two stations.

All public road transport (except for some minibuses) is operated by the united Kyivpastrans municipal company. It is heavily subsidized by the city.

The Kyiv public transport system, except for taxi, uses a simple flat rate tariff system regardless of distance traveled: tickets or tokens must be purchased each time a vehicle is boarded. Digital ticket system is already established in Kyiv Metro, with plans for other transport modes. The cost of one ride is far lower than in Western Europe.

The taxi market in Kyiv is expansive but not regulated. In particular, the taxi fare per kilometer is not regulated. There is a fierce competition between private taxi companies.

==== Roads and bridges ====
Kyiv represents the focal point of Ukraine's "national roads" system, thus linked by road to all cities of the country. European routes, and intersect in Kyiv.

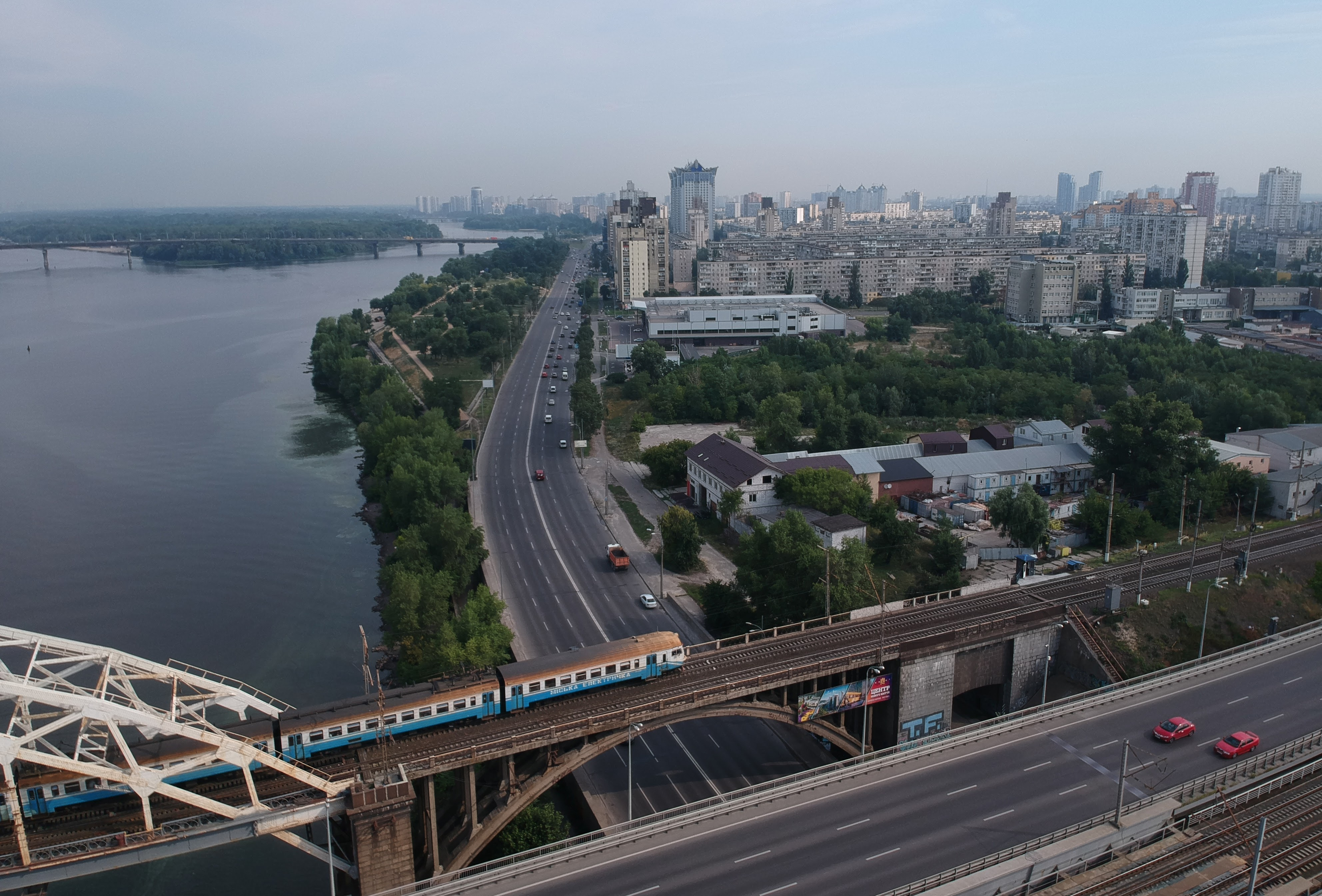
Intersection of New Darnytsia Bridge and Dnipro Embankment in Kyiv

There are eight Dnieper bridges and dozens of grade-separated intersections in the city. Several new intersections are under construction. There are plans to build a full-size, fully grade-separated ring road around Kyiv.

In 2009, Kyiv's roads were in poor technical condition and maintained inadequately.

Traffic jams and lack of parking space are growing problems for all road transport services in Kyiv.

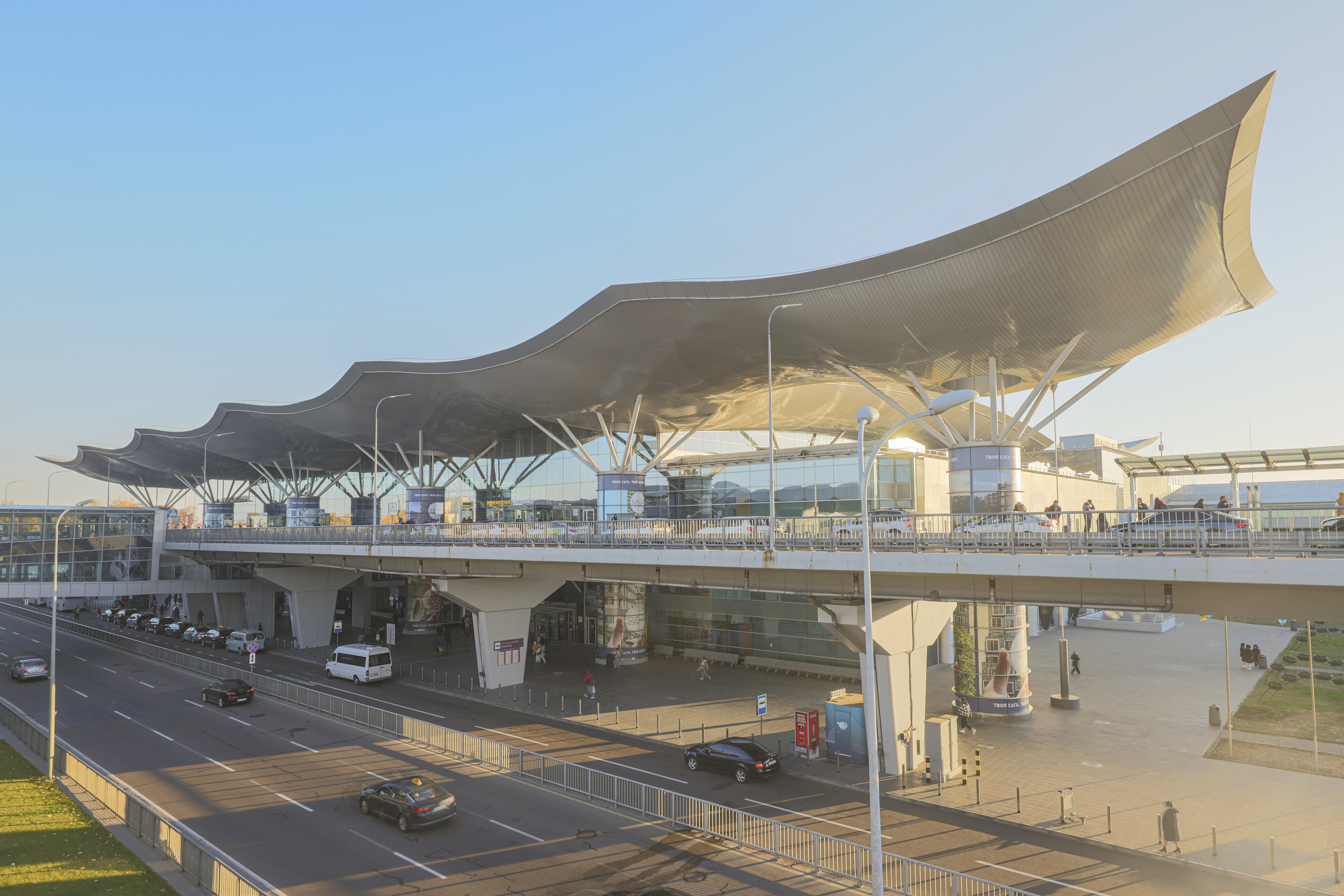
Boryspil International Airport

==== Air transport ====
Kyiv is served by two international passenger airports: the Boryspil Airport 30 kilometres (19 miles) away, and the smaller, municipally owned Zhuliany Airport on the southern outskirts of the city. There are also the Hostomel cargo airport and additional three operating airfields facilitating the Antonov aircraft manufacturing company and general aviation.

==== Railways ====
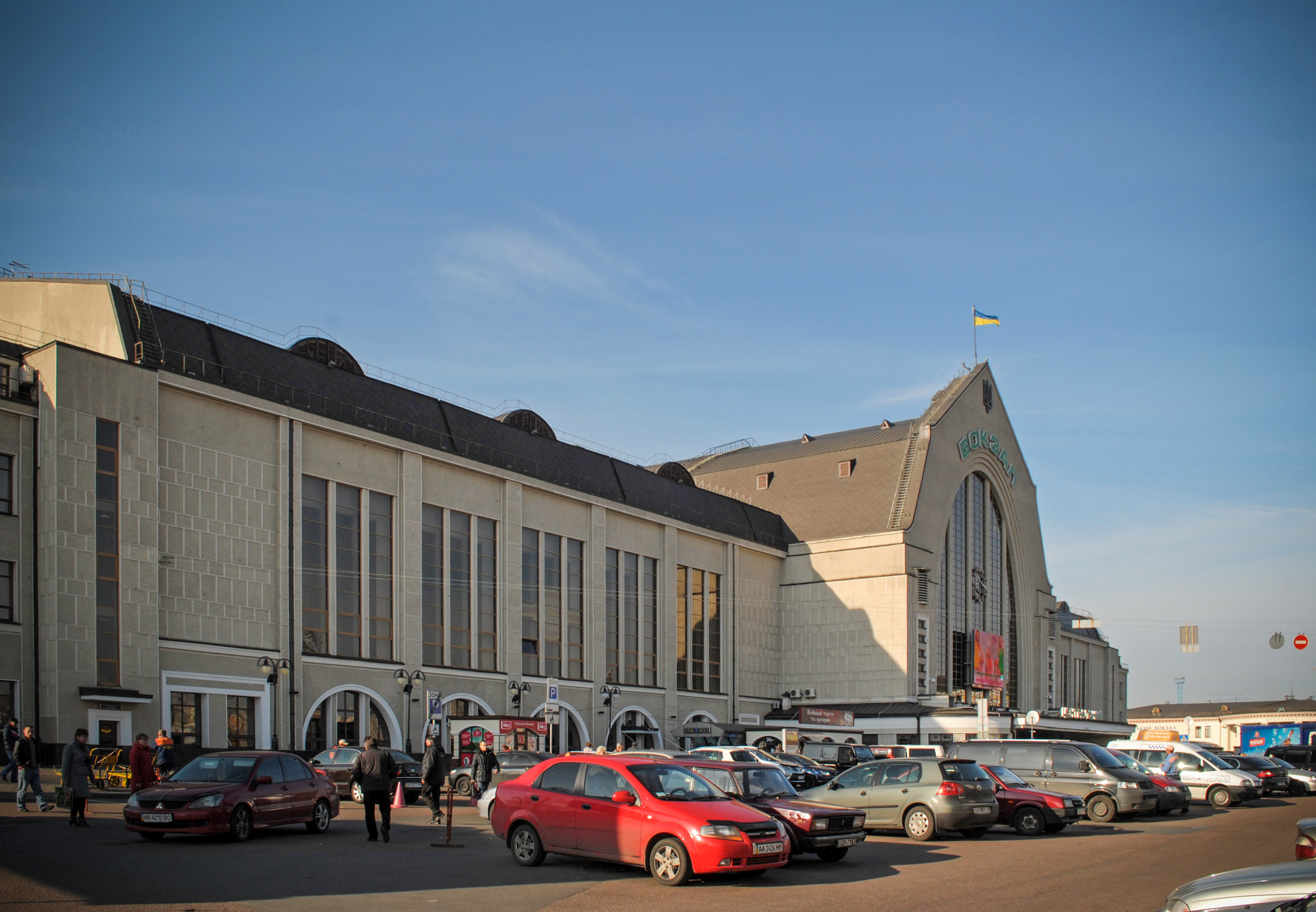
Kyiv-Pasazhyrskyi railway station

Railways are Kyiv's main mode of intracity- and suburban transportation. The city has a developed railroad infrastructure including a long-distance passenger station, 6 cargo stations, depots, and repairing facilities. However, this system still fails to meet the demand for passenger service. Particularly, the Kyiv-Pasazhyrskyi railway station is the city's only long-distance passenger terminal (vokzal).

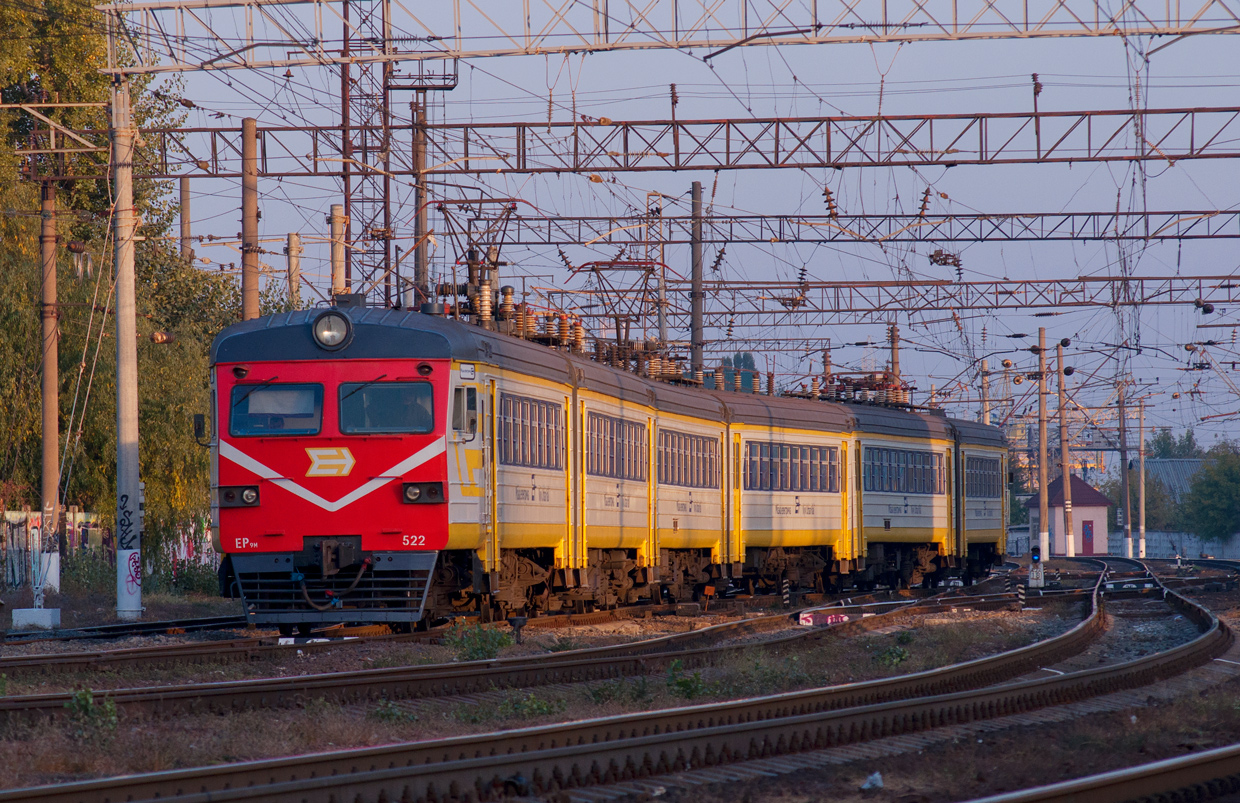
A suburban train in Kyiv-Demiivskyi railway station

Construction is underway for turning the large Darnytsia railway station on the left-bank part of Kyiv into a long-distance passenger hub, which may ease traffic at the central station. Bridges over the Dnieper River are another problem restricting the development of city's railway system. Presently, only one rail bridge out of two is available for intense train traffic. A new combined rail-auto bridge is under construction, as a part of Darnytsia project.

In 2011, the Kyiv city administration established the new Urban Train for Kyiv. This service runs at standard 4- to 10-minute intervals throughout the day and follows a circular route around the city centre, which allows it to serve many of Kyiv's inner suburbs. Interchanges between the Kyiv Metro and Fast Tram exist at many of the urban train's station stops.

Suburban 'Kyiv City Express' trains (colloquially known as elektrychka) are serviced by the publicly owned Ukrainian Railways. The suburban train service is fast, and unbeatably safe in terms of traffic accidents. But the trains are not reliable, as they may fall significantly behind schedule, may not be safe in terms of crime, and the elektrychka cars are poorly maintained and overcrowded in rush hours.

There are nine elektrychka directions from Kyiv:

- Bila Tserkva – Uzyn
- Fastiv
- Klavdiievo
- Myronivka – Bohuslav
- Nizhyn
- Ukrainka
- Vasylkiv
- Vyshhorod
- Yahotyn

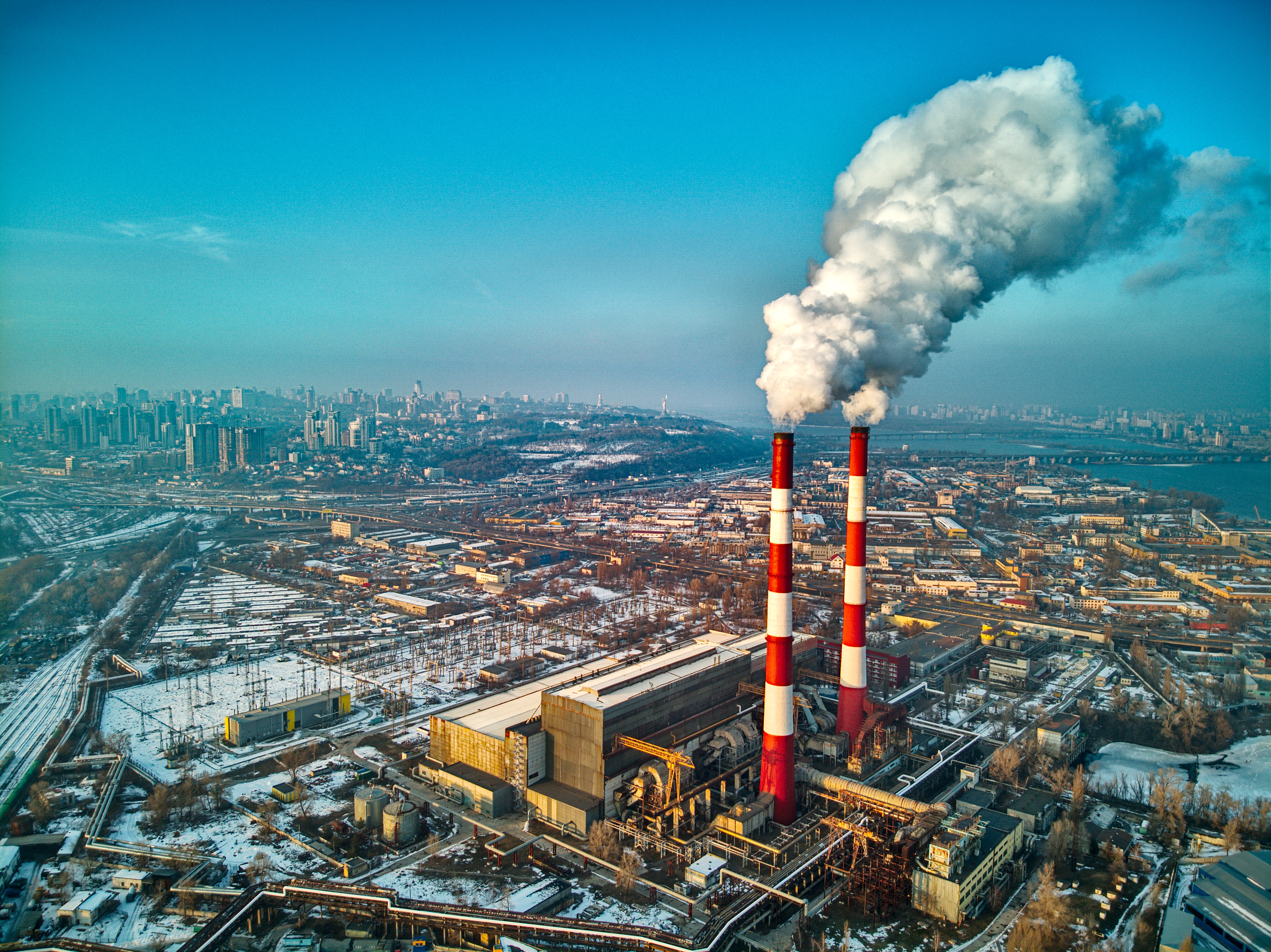
CHP-5 (ТЕЦ-5) is the largest and most powerful combined heat and power plant in Ukraine.

More than a dozen of elektrychka stops are within the city allowing residents of different neighborhoods to use the suburban trains.

=== Energy ===
DTEK Kyiv Electric Networks (formerly Kyivenergo) is the electric power distribution network operator for Kyiv, owned by oligarch Rinat Akhmetov. As of 2021 it had:

- 12,038 km of power transmission lines with a voltage of 0.4–110 kV
- 64 substations with a voltage of 35–110 kV
- 243 switchgears and 3728 transformer substations at 10 kV

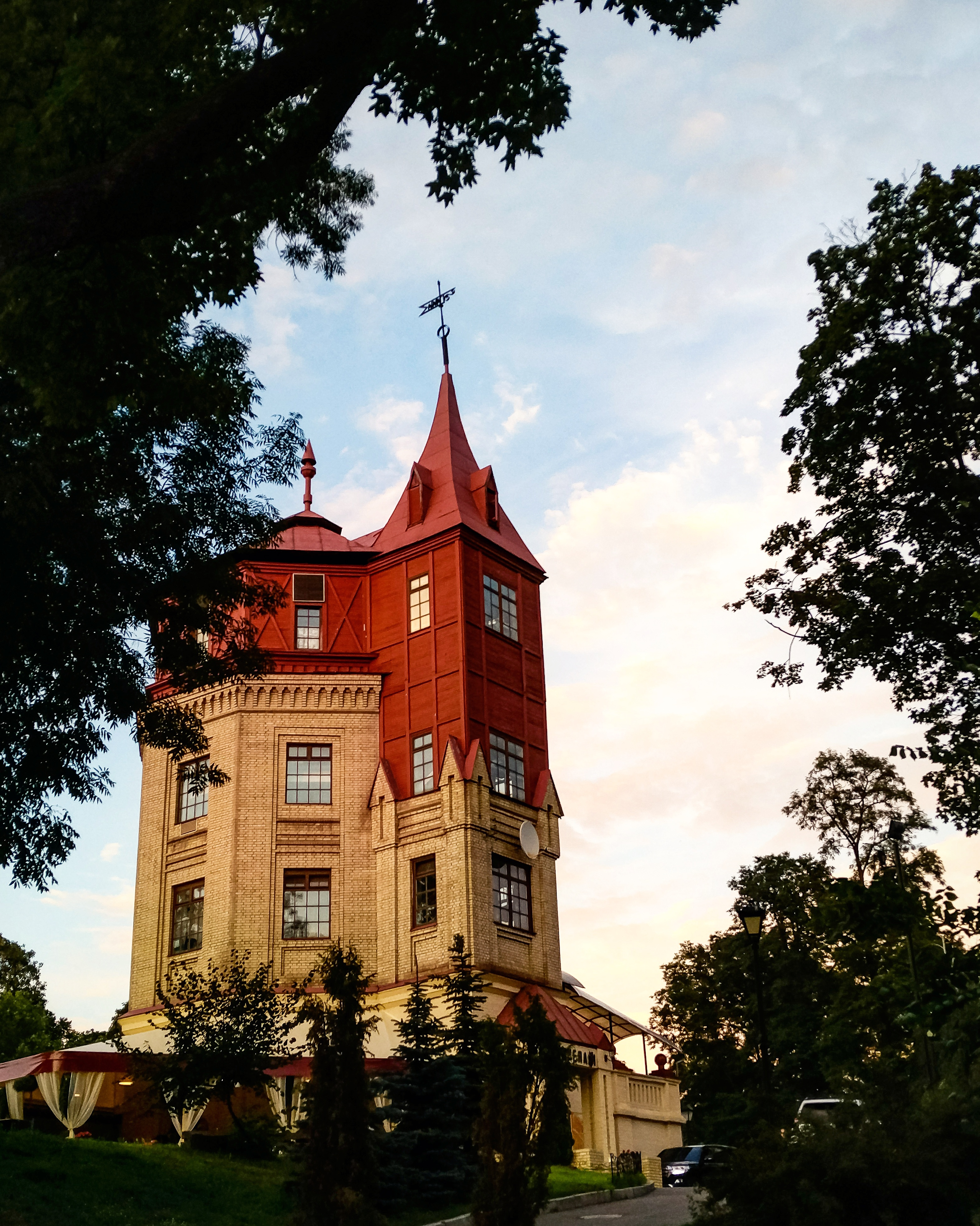
Historical water tower in Kyiv, now a museum

Kyivteploenergo operates a centralized heating system, which provides heating and hot water to customers through a network of pipes that distribute hot water from centralized heating plants to buildings throughout the city. It operates a 2700 km network, two of the largest combined heat and power plants in Ukraine CHP-5 and CHP-6, as well as the only waste incineration plant Energia (plant) operating in Ukraine.

In line with the EU Third Energy Package, since 2019 state energy policy abandoned the Rotterdam plus system and has required transmission system operator (TSO) and regional utilities unbundling in order to separate electricity distribution and retail electricity supply.

=== Water and sanitation ===
The national government has delegated responsibility for water and sanitation services to local authorities. Kyivvodokanal is a private joint-stock company that provides such services to Kyiv. The length of water supply networks is 4231 km, of which 1798 km are dilapidated. The length of sewage networks is 2662 km, of which 830 km are dilapidated.

== Twin towns – sister cities ==
Kyiv is twinned with:

- Ankara, Turkey (1993)
- Ashgabat, Turkmenistan (2001)
- Astana, Kazakhstan (1998)
- Athens, Greece (1996)
- Baku, Azerbaijan (1997)
- Beijing, China (1993)
- Berlin, Germany (2023)
- Bishkek, Kyrgyzstan (1997)
- Brasília, Brazil (2000)
- Bratislava, Slovakia (1969)
- Brussels, Belgium (1997)
- Bucharest, Romania (2022)
- Buenos Aires, Argentina (2000)
- Chicago, United States (1991)
- Chișinău, Moldova (1993)
- Copenhagen, Denmark (2023)
- Edinburgh, Scotland (1989)
- Florence, Italy (1967)
- Jakarta, Indonesia (2005)
- Kraków, Poland (1993)
- Kyoto, Japan (1971)
- Leipzig, Germany (1956)
- Lima, Peru (2005)
- Mexico City, Mexico (1997)
- Munich, Germany (1989)
- Odense, Denmark (1989)
- Osh Region, Kyrgyzstan (2002)
- Pretoria, South Africa (1993)
- Riga, Latvia (1998)
- Rio de Janeiro, Brazil (2000)
- Santiago, Chile (1998)
- Sofia, Bulgaria (1997)
- Suzhou, China (2005)
- Tallinn, Estonia (1994)
- Tampere, Finland (1954)
- Tashkent, Uzbekistan (1998)
- Tbilisi, Georgia (1999)
- Toulouse, France (1975)
- Vilnius, Lithuania (1991)
- Warsaw, Poland (1994)
- Wuhan, China (1990)

=== Other cooperation agreements ===
- Belgrade, Serbia (2002)
- Helsinki, Finland
- Jerusalem, Israel (2000)
- Lisbon, Portugal
- Paris, France
- Rome, Italy
- Stockholm, Sweden
- Toronto, Canada (1991)
- Tripoli, Libya (2001)
- Vienna, Austria
- Yerevan, Armenia (1995)

== Notable people ==
=== Born in Kyiv ===
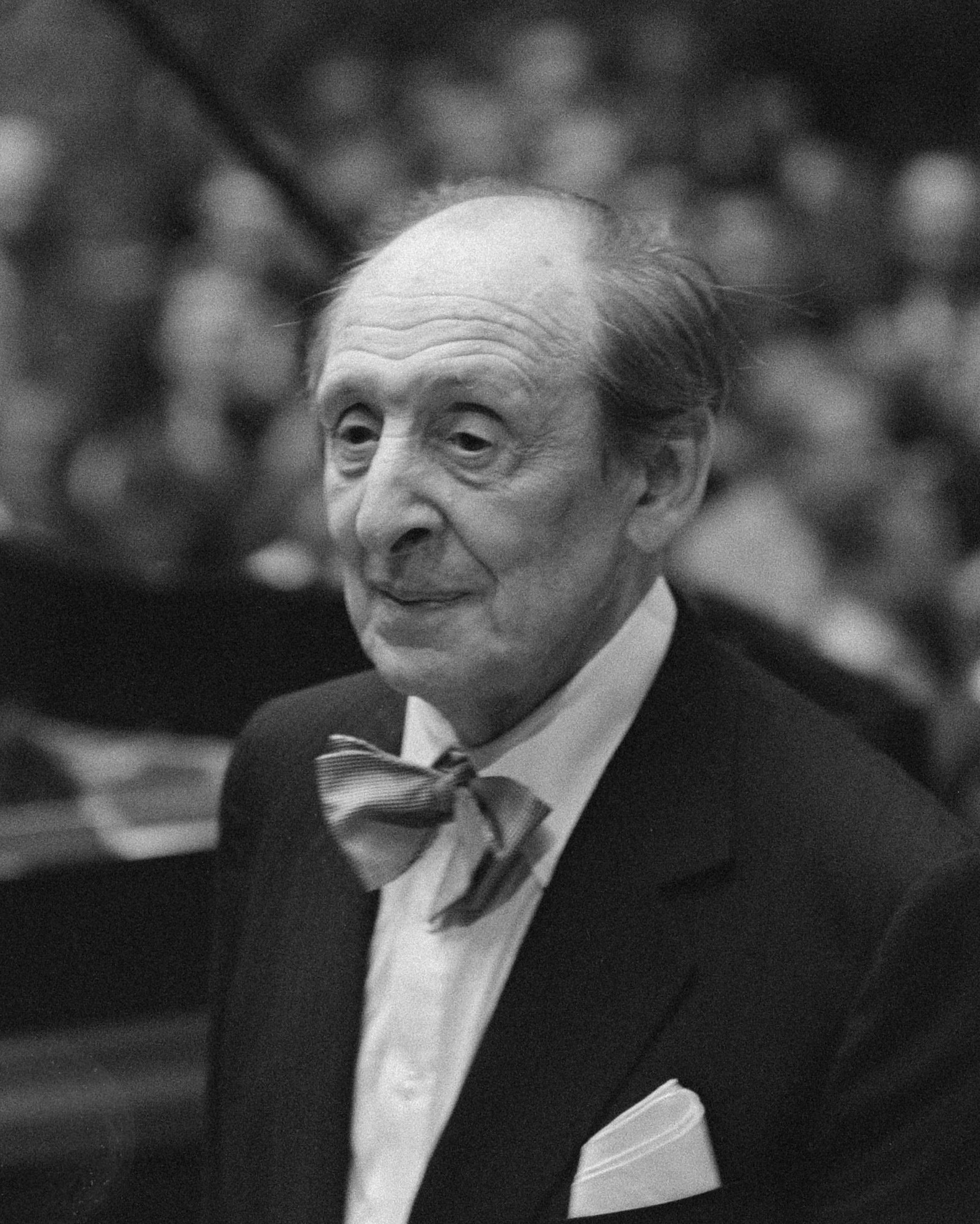
Vladimir Horowitz

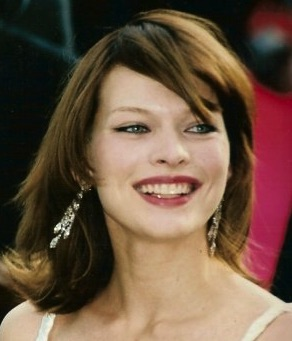
Milla Jovovich

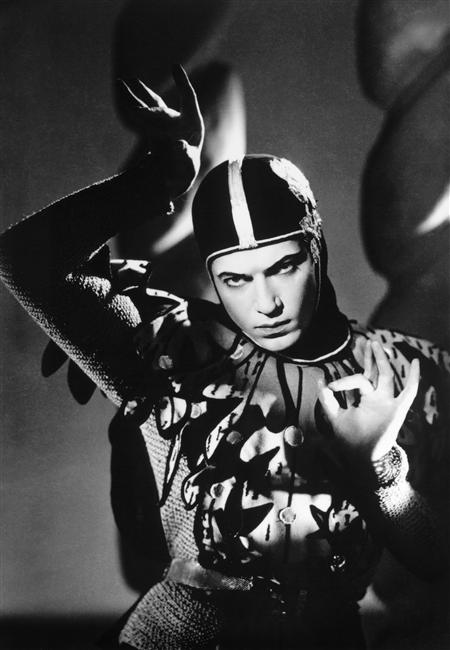
Serge Lifar, 1941

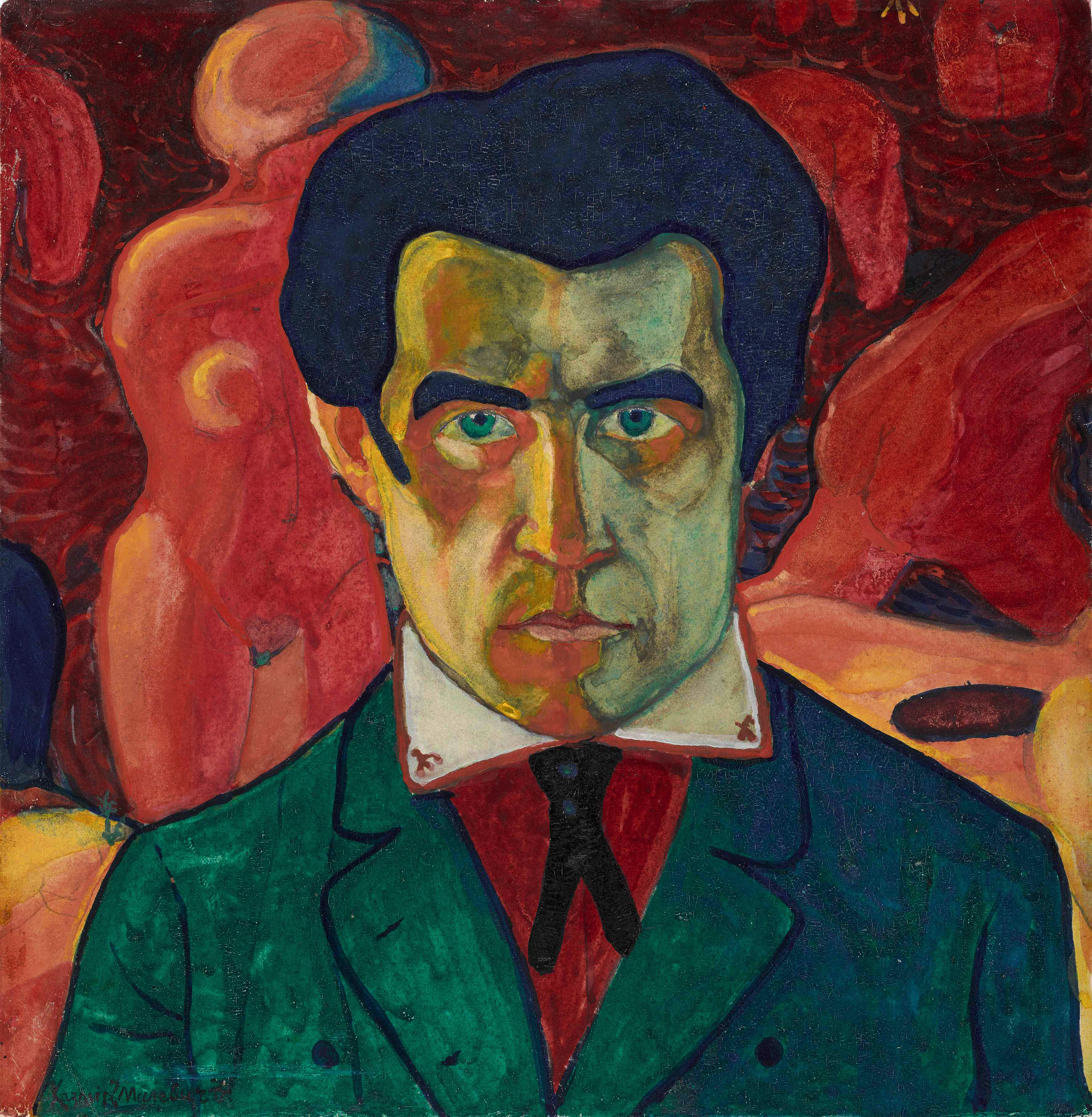
Kazimir Malevich

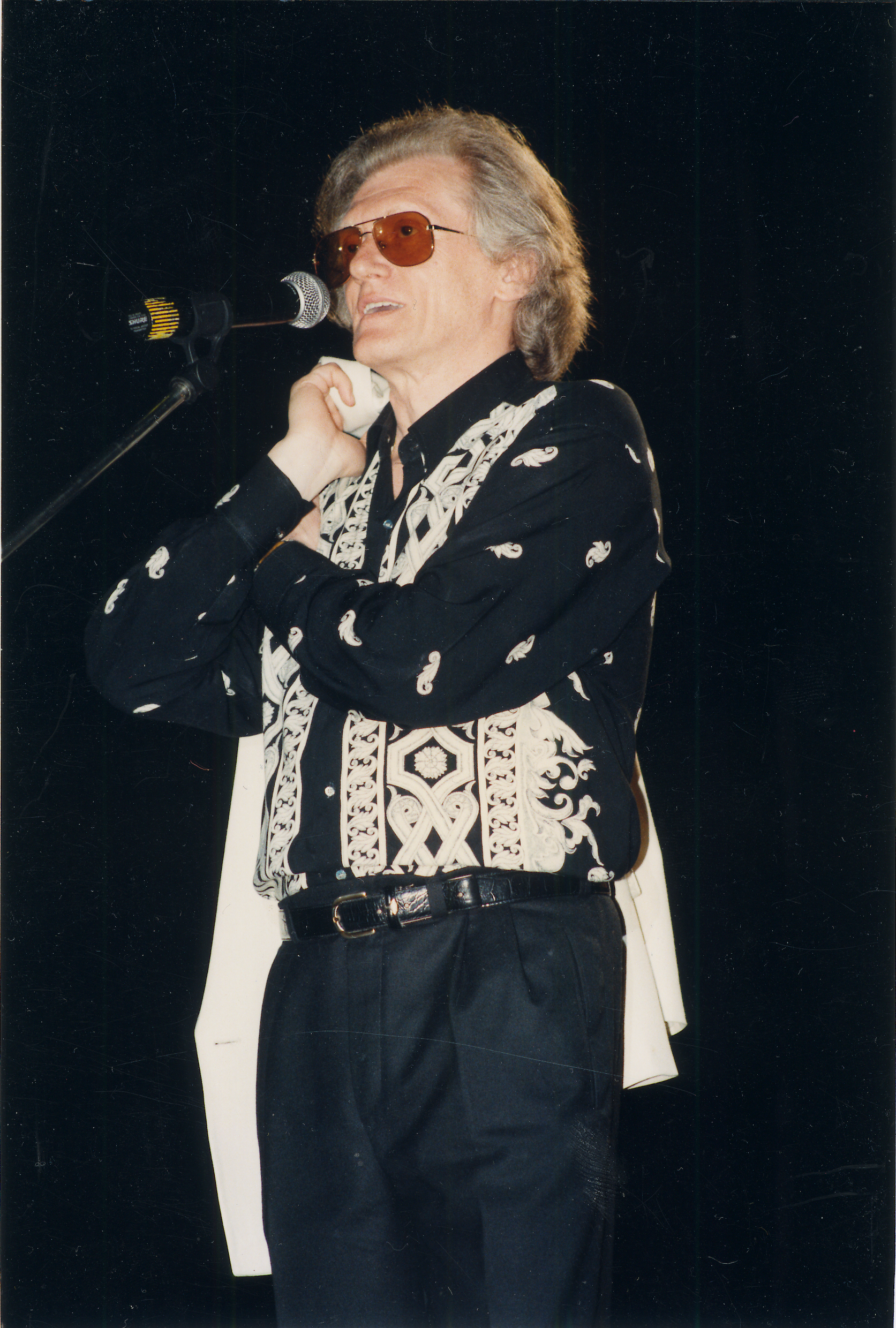
Yuriy Rybchynskyi

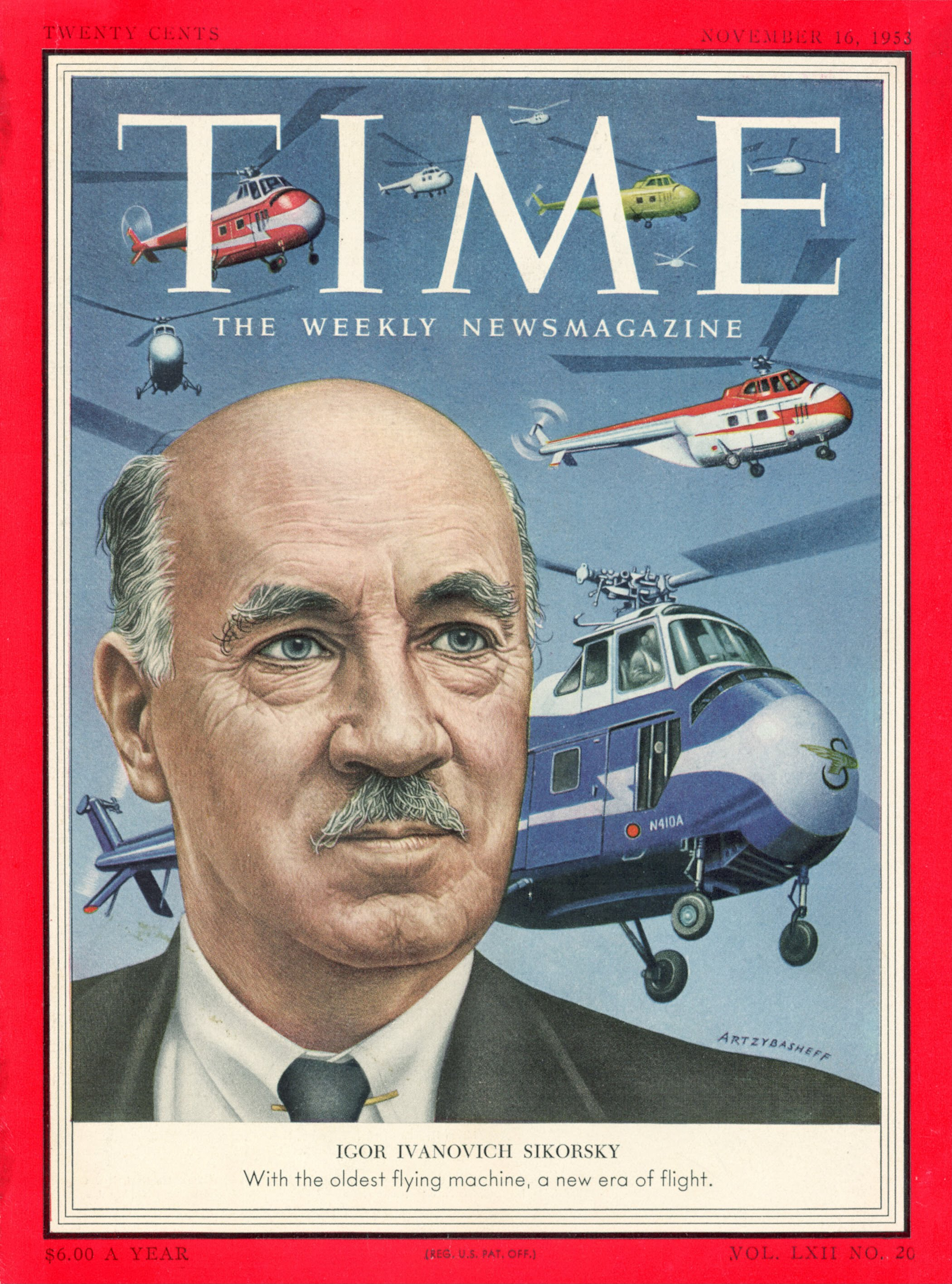
Igor Sikorsky on Time magazine cover, 1953

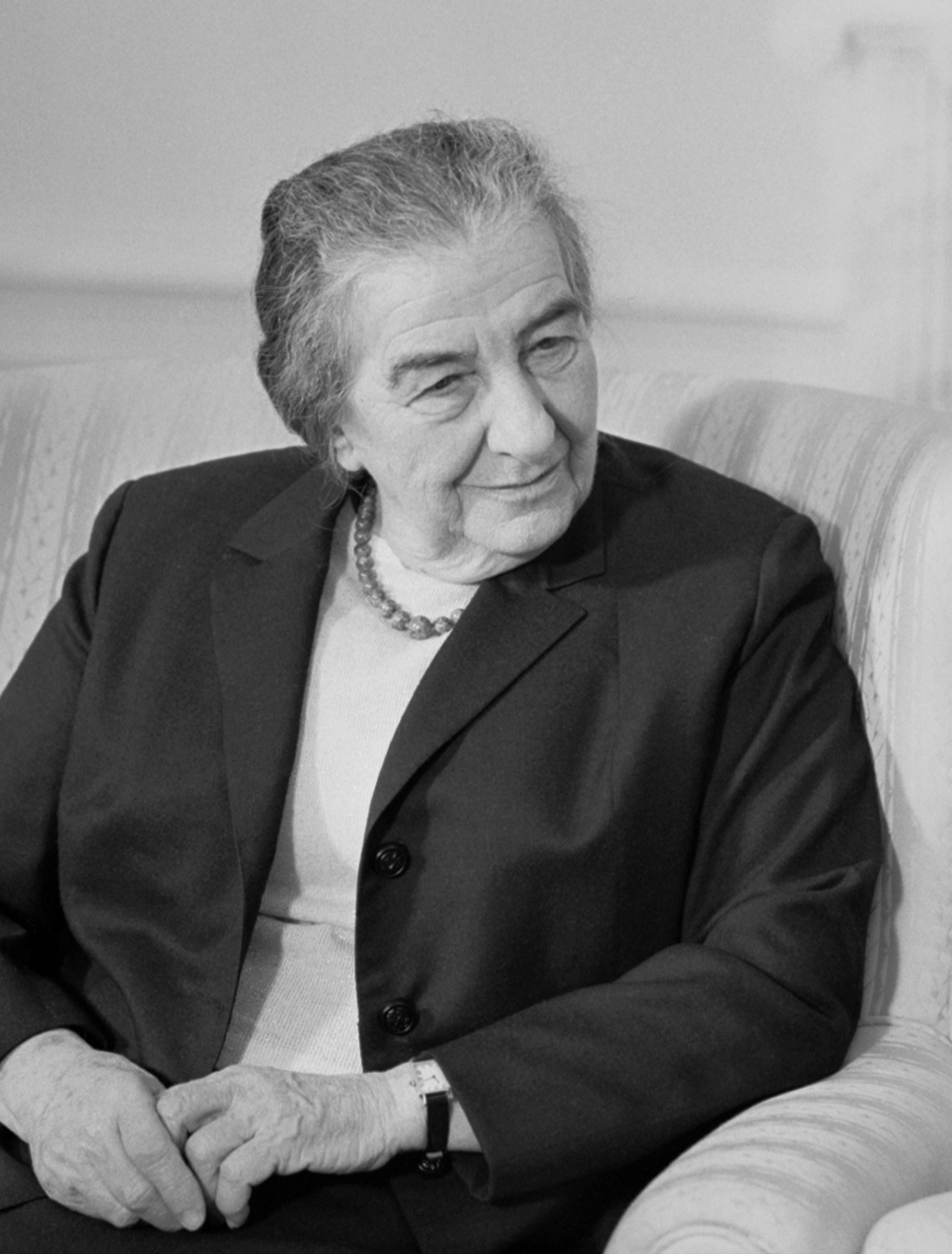
Golda Meir, Prime Minister of Israel, 1973

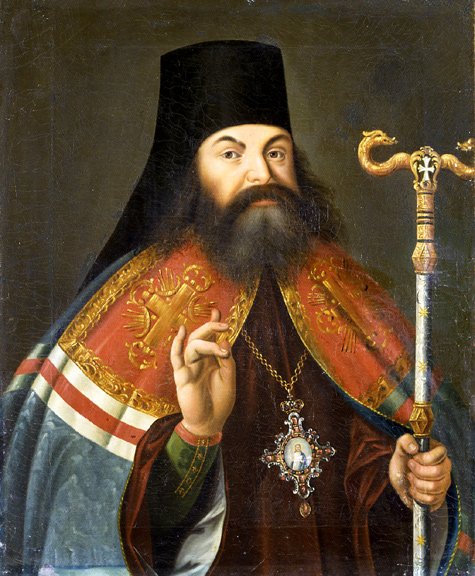
Theophan Prokopovich

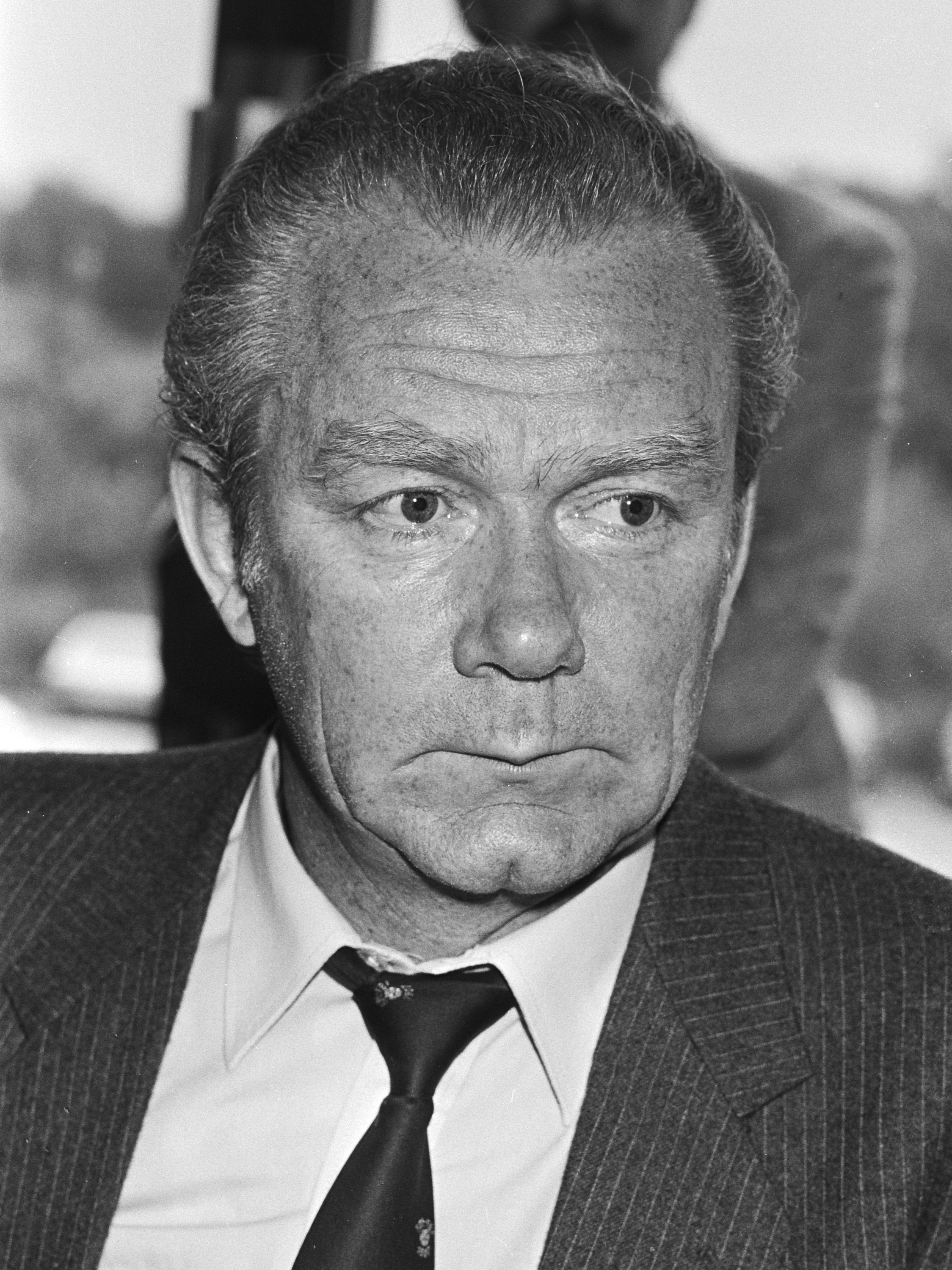
Valeriy Lobanovskyi

==== Arts, literature, and entertainment ====
- Iryna Bilyk (born 1970), Ukrainian singer
- Leonid Bronevoy (1928–2017), Soviet and Russian actor
- Mikhail Bulgakov (1891–1940), Soviet writer, medical doctor and playwright
- Eugenia Chuprina (born 1971), poet, novelist, writer and playwright
- Maya Deren (1917–1961), filmmaker
- Maryna (born 1968) and Serhiy Dyachenko (1945–2022), fantasy fiction authors
- Ilya Ehrenburg (1891–1967), Soviet writer, journalist, translator and cultural figure
- Zuzanna Ginczanka (1917–1945), Polish poet of Jewish ethnicity
- Reinhold Glière (1875–1956), composer
- André Grabar (1896–1990), historian of Romanesque art and the art of the Eastern Roman Empire and the Bulgarian Empire
- Selma Gubin (1903–1974), American artist
- Olha Haidamaka (born 1990), Ukrainian artist
- Milton Horn (1906–1995), American sculptor
- Vladimir Horowitz (1903–1989), American classical pianist
- Ivan Hryhorovych Barsky (1713–1791), Ukrainian Baroque architect
- Vasyl Hryhorovych-Barsky (1700–1747), monk and travelogue author
- Viktor Ivanov (1909–1981), Soviet film director
- Milla Jovovich (born 1975), American actress
- Irina Karnaoukhova (1901–1959), Ukrainian-Russian children's writer and folklorist
- Sonya Koshkina (born 1985), Ukrainian journalist, editor-in-chief
- Kateryna Kukhar (born 1982), prima ballerina
- Danylo Knyshuk (born 1978), Ukrainian sculptor
- Viacheslav Kryshtofovych (1947–2025), Ukrainian film director and actor
- Ana Layevska (born 1982), Ukrainian-Mexican actress
- Boris Levit-Broun (born 1950), Russian poet, writer, and artist
- Serge Lifar (1905–1986), ballet dancer
- Kazimir Malevich (1879–1935), pioneer of geometric abstract art and the originator of the avant-garde Suprematist movement
- Natalya Marchenkova (born 1948), animator and animation director, born in Kyiv
- Natalia Matsak (born 1982), ballet dancer
- Galyna Moskvitina (born 1963), painter
- Viktor Nekrasov (1911–1987), Soviet writer and dissident
- Nikolay Nosov (1908–1976), Soviet writer
- Ivan Putrov (born 1980), dancer, former Principal with The Royal Ballet in London
- Maksym Petrenko (1983–2022), Ukrainian writer, scientist, inventor, educator, soldier
- Les Podervianskyi (born 1952), underground author and artist
- Dmitry (1899–1978) and Samuel Pokrass (1893–1939), composers
- Vitaly Portnikov (born 1967), Ukrainian journalist and publicist
- Yudif Grigorevna Rozhavskaya (1923–1982), composer and pianist
- Yuriy Rybchynskyi (born 1945), poet and playwright
- Ivanna Sakhno (born 1997), actress
- Natalya Semenchenko (born 1976), professor, writer, and publicist
- Ihor Shamo (1925–1982), Ukrainian composer of the Soviet era
- Yuriy Shcherbak (born 1934), Ukrainian author
- Lev Shestov (1866–1938), Russian existentialist philosopher
- Oksana Shvets (1955–2022), Ukrainian actress
- Kostiantyn Stohniy (born 1968), journalist
- Alexander Vertinsky (1889–1957), singer, composer, poet, cabaret artist and actor
- Artemy Vedel (1767–1808), composer
- Sergei Udovik (born 1956), publisher, photographer and writer
- Ludmila Anatolievna Yaroshevskaya (1906–1975), composer
- Mariia Yunak (1902–1977), Ukrainian artist

==== Science and technology ====
- Jan Koum (born 1976), American computer programmer, CEO and co-founder of WhatsApp
- Viktor Kaspruk (born 1955), political scientist
- Alexander Ostrowski (1893–1986), mathematician
- Borys Paton (1918–2020), scientist, chairman of the National Academy of Sciences of Ukraine
- Tetiana Podchasova (born 1940), Ukrainian economist-cyberneticist, computer scientist
- Igor Sikorsky (1889–1972), Russian-American aviation pioneer
- Svetlana Zaginaichenko (1957–2015), physicist

==== Politics ====
- Golda Meir (1898–1978), Israeli politician, the fourth Prime Minister of Israel
- Henry P. Melnikow, economic consultant to unions involved in labor
- Eugene Vindman (born 1975), U.S. representative for Virginia

==== Religion ====
- Mikhail Morgulis (1941–2021), Russian-language writer, editor and theologian
- Theophan Prokopovich (1681–1736), theologian, poet, mathematician and philosopher

==== Military ====
- Eugeniusz Horbaczewski (1917–1944), Polish fighter pilot
- Yuliia "Taira" Paievska (born 1968), Ukrainian medic

==== Sport ====
- Oleg Blokhin (born 1952), Ukrainian football player
- Oleg Ladik (born 1971), Ukrainian-born Canadian Olympic wrestler
- Valeriy Lobanovskyi (1939–2002), Soviet and Ukrainian football coach
- Oleksandr Saliuk Jr. (born 1978), Ukrainian rally driver
- Igor Slyusar (born 1989), Ukrainian professional ice hockey player
- Igor Skuz (born 1976), Ukrainian racing driver

==== Other ====
- Semyon Mogilevich (born 1946), international organized crime boss

=== Lived in Kyiv ===
- Nikolai Amosov (1913–2002), Soviet and Ukrainian heart surgeon and inventor
- Nikolai Berdyaev (1874–1948), Russian Orthodox religious and political philosopher
- Daniel the Traveller, 12th-century travel writer from the Kievan Rus'
- Zino Davidoff (1906–1994), Swiss premium tobacco manufacturer; known as "King of Cigars"
- Dmytro Hnatiuk (1925–2016), Ukrainian singer
- Vikentiy Khvoyka (1850–1914), archaeologist
- Volodymyr Klychko (born 1976), Ukrainian boxer
- Jonathan Markovitch (born 1967), Chief Rabbi of Kyiv
- Petro Mohyla (1596–1647), Metropolitan bishop of Kyiv from 1633
- Moses of Kiev, 12th century Talmudist
- Andriy Shevchenko (born 1976), Ukrainian footballer

== Honour ==
- Kyiv Peninsula in Graham Land, Antarctica, is named after the city of Kyiv.

== See also ==
- List of national landmarks of cultural heritage in Kyiv
- List of crossings of the Dnieper River
- List of universities, colleges, and research institutions in Kyiv
- Yehupetz

== Sources ==
- Bilous, Natalia Oleksijivna (2008). Київ наприкінці XIV — у першій половині XVII століття. Міська влада і самоврядування [Kyiv at the end of the 14th century — first half of the 17th century. City authorities and self-government.] (PDF) (in Ukrainian). Kyiv: Publishing House Kyiv-Mohyla Academy. p. 360. ISBN 978-966-518-450-8. Archived (PDF) from the original on 9 September 2025.
- Hamm, Michael F. (1993). Kiev. A portrait, 1800–1917.
- Magocsi, Paul Robert (1996). A History of Ukraine: The Land and Its Peoples (2nd, revised ed.). University of Toronto Press. ISBN 978-1-4426-9879-6. Archived from the original on 14 June 2020.
- Martin, Janet (2007). Medieval Russia: 980–1584. Second Edition. E-book. Cambridge: Cambridge University Press. ISBN 978-0-511-36800-4.

| Preceded by Istanbul 2004 | Eurovision Song Contest Hosts; 2005 | Succeeded by Athens 2006 |

| Preceded by Stockholm 2016 | Eurovision Song Contest Hosts; 2017 | Succeeded by Lisbon 2018 |
