= Pavlo Zhebrivskyi =

Ukrainian politician

- Павло Жебрівський
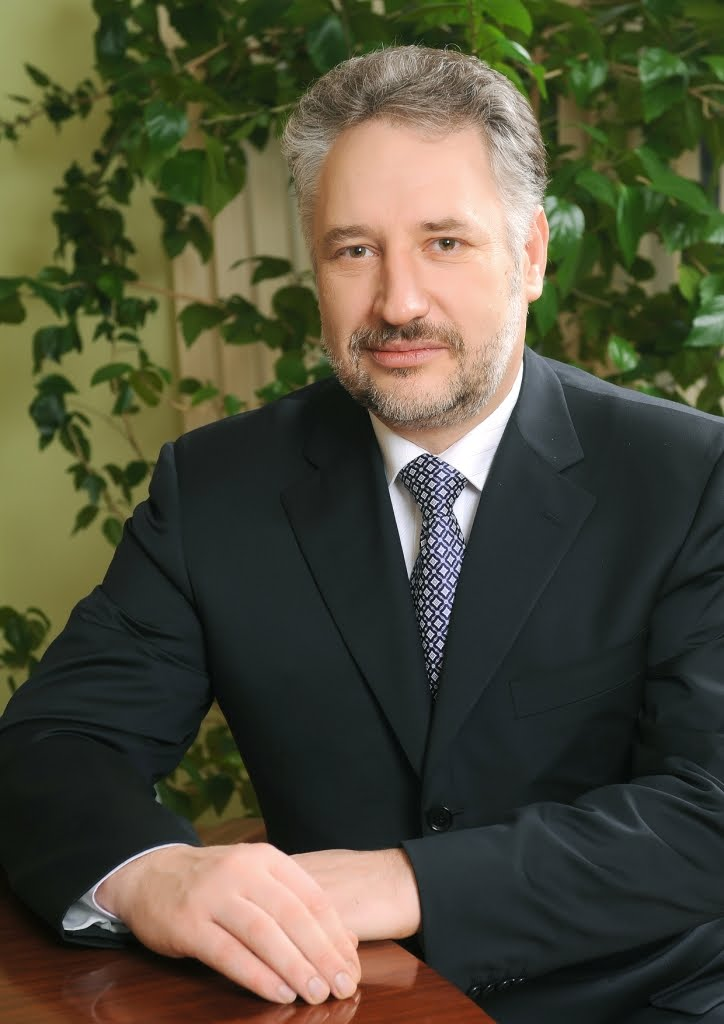

Leader of the Republican Platform
- Incumbent
- Assumed office 19 December 2018

Auditor of the National Anti-Corruption Bureau of Ukraine
- In office June – November 2018

Head of Donetsk Oblast military civilian administration
- Disputed (Note: Control over Donetsk Oblast is disputed due to the Russo-Ukrainian War. Alexander Zakharchenko was installed by Russia as Head of the Donetsk People's Republic, while Zhebrivskyi was loyal to the Ukrainian government.)
- In office 11 June 2015 – 13 June 2018
- Preceded by: Oleksandr Kikhtenko
- Succeeded by: Oleksandr Kuts

Head of the Anti-Corruption Department of the General Prosecutor Office of Ukraine
- In office January – June 2015

Head of Zhytomyr Regional State Administration
- In office April – December 2005

Member of the Verkhovna Rada
- In office 14 May 2002 – 12 December 2012

Personal details
- Born: March 21, 1962 (age 64) Nemyryntsi, Zhytomyr Oblast, Soviet Union
- Citizenship: Ukraine
- Party: Republican Platform

Pavlo Ivanovych Zhebrivskyi (Ukrainian: Павло Іванович Жебрівський, born 21 March 1962) is a Ukrainian politician, leader of the political party Republican Platform.

The people's deputy of the Verkhovna Rada of Ukraine of the IV, V and VI congresses, the chairman of the Zhytomyr Regional State Administration (2005), head of the Anti-Corruption Directorate of the General Prosecutor's Office of Ukraine (2015), chairman of the Donetsk region al the military-civilian administration (from 2015 to 2018), auditor of the National Anti-Corruption Bureau of Ukraine (from June 19, 2018 to November 15, 2018). The founder of the project is the financial support of small and medium-sized businesses "Ukrainian Donetsk Kurkul", the United Ukrainian Cultural Space program, "cities' ukrainianization" in the Donetsk region.

== Childhood ==
Born in the Polish Roman Catholic family.

His father Ivan Pavlovich Zhebrivskyi worked as a driver at a factory in the collective farm of the village of Nemirintsy. Ivan Pavlovich Zhebrivskyi, from June 22, 1942, fought during the Second World War, participated in the assault of Berlin. He received the military awards – the Order of the Red Star, the medal "For military service", the Order of "Patriotic War of the 2nd degree.", The medal "For the Defense of Stalingrad", "For the liberation of Warsaw", "For the capture of Berlin", "For victory over Germany" " etc.

His mother Yanina Ivanivna Zhebrivska worked as a beet farmer on a collective farm.

The parents had six children – five daughters and one son – Pavlo Zhebrivskyi.

In 1979 he graduated from Nemyrynensky secondary school in the Ruzhinsky district of Zhytomyr region.

== Business career ==
- 1979-1980 – factory of reinforced concrete constructions of the "Budindustriya" industrial complex in Kyiv.
- 1980-1982 – service in the army
- 1989 – graduated from Kyiv National Taras Shevchenko University, received a lawyer degree.
- 1983-1991 – work in law enforcement agencies, began as a policeman of patrol service, graduated from the senior investigator of the Department of Internal Affairs, the city of Kyiv.
- November 1991 – April 2002 – entrepreneurial activity.
- 1993-1994 – General Director of Joint-Stock Company "Jaya", Kyiv.
- 1994-2001 – General Director of Private Enterprise "YAN", Kyiv.
- From 2001 to April 2002 – President of CJSC "Pharmacy-2000" (Kyiv).

== Political career ==
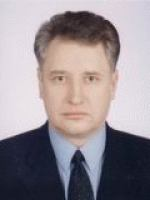
Zhebriksyi as a Member of the Verkhovna Rada, 2002

- From April 2002 to July 2005 – People's Deputy of Ukraine of the 4th convocation, deputy Chairman of the Committee on Health, Maternity and Childhood. Constituency number 65, Zhytomyr region, self-nomination
- From February 4 to December 19, 2005 – he was appointed chairman of the Zhytomyr Regional State Administration. During his tenure, he introduced a project of national patriotic education "Little Ukrainian". With his assistance, the work of kindergartens was restored, schools were modernized. During his tenure as the head of the regional state administration, he attracted over 50 million euro of foreign investment to the oblast's budget. Has carried out gasification of rural settlements of Zhytomyr region. Construction of the Kyiv-Warsaw Autobahn started.
- Since 2006, the People's Deputy of Ukraine of the 5th convocation from the bloc "Nasha Ukraina". First Deputy Chairman of the Committee, Chairman of the Subcommittee of the Verkhovna Rada Committee of the Subcommittee on State Debt, Borrowings, Investment Projects of the Budget Committee of the Verkhovna Rada of Ukraine (July 2006). He finished deputy powers on June 8, 2007.
- From November 2007 to November 2012, he was a people's deputy of the 6th convocation of the Our Ukraine–People's Self-Defense Bloc. Being a member of the Budget Committee, he was the chairman of the Budget Committee's Committee on Budget Expenditure.
- In March 2009, he assembled a team of like-minded people and created an ideological political party "Ukrainian Platform". Subsequently, he initiated an association with the Ukrainian Republican Party "Sobor".
- At the XVIII Congress of the Ukrainian Republican Party "Sobor" December 3, 2011, Pavlo Zhebrivskyi was elected chairman of the Ukrainian Platform "Sobor" political party.
- In August 2014, Pavlo Zhebrivskyi established the powers of the party's chairman, after serving as a volunteer in the ATO zone in the rank of senior sergeant.
- From August 2014 to January 2015 he served as a volunteer in the Donbass area as a senior sergeant. Fought with his fellow countrymen from the Novograd-Volynsky 54th separate intelligence battalion. Participated in battles with separatists under Debaltsevo and other cities of Donetsk Region and Luhansk Region.
- After demobilization, in January 2015, he headed the Office of the Prosecutor General of Ukraine for the investigation of corruption crimes committed by officials who occupy a particularly responsible position. During his work in the GPU, he conducts pre-trial investigation in 40 proceedings. During 4 months, the investigation authorities reported suspicions to 17 people, including people's deputy, judge of the appellate and local courts, lawyer, prosecutor's office, tax militia, and heads of state-owned enterprises. In addition, reports of suspicion of people's deputies and high officials of the Ministry of Internal Affairs of Ukraine were prepared. The search for 6 people was announced.
- On June 11, 2015, the President of Ukraine appointed Pavlo Zhebrivskyi as head of the Head of Donetsk regional military civilian administration. Under the direction of Pavlo Zhebrivskyi, the main goal was to turn Donetsk Region into a single Ukrainian space, the realization of which allowed the implementation of social, economic and cultural projects. The "Cities' ukrainianization" was carried out, the project "Unified Ukrainian Cultural Space" was developed, favorable conditions for training and development of youth were created, and opportunities for the economic sector (business) in the region were created.

In the economic sphere: international investment is involved in the regional budget. Under the direction of Pavlo Zhebrivskyi, a project for financial support of small and medium-sized businesses in the Donetsk region under the name "Ukrainian Donetsk Kurkul" was launched.

In the social sphere: a new modern educational space with modern kindergartens and reference schools has been created. 185 units for orphans and children deprived of parental care were purchased and six houses of family type were created. 115 sports and 209 training platforms in the region were built. 80 innovative development centers for children and youth have been opened. In the field of public health, the Regional Department of Hemodialysis, 8 computer tomography rooms have been opened.

In the environmental sphere: 41 units of special equipment and 1 unit for the processing and disposal of mercury waste were purchased. Construction of regional landfills for solid household wastes has started in the cities of Kramatorsk, Kurakhovo, Volnovaha. The wastewater treatment facilities in the city of Konstantinovka, Bakhmut and Dobropol region were opened. The first automated environmental monitoring system in Ukraine, which meets the requirements of EU directives, was introduced. New parks, squares built.

Restoration and construction of infrastructure on the territory of Donetsk region: the ceilings on the entrances to the region have been updated, new stops have been constructed. Purchased 20 trolleybuses and 21 trams. Repairs of 153 roads of communal ownership form have been completed. 8 bridges and overpasses were repaired. 41 units of communal equipment were purchased.

Improving the quality of governance: 4 updated centers for the provision of administrative services have been opened; in 27 CNAAs, activities have been provided, which allowed to increase the number of visitors by 4 times and reduce the time of maintenance. Six citizens' security centers opened.

Overcoming the consequences of ATO: Over 700 houses and social facilities were restored on the territory of combat operations, lines of separation. An alternative system of power supply networks has been restored and created from the territory under the control of Ukraine: Zaytsevo village, Travneve village, Gladosovo village and Avdiivka municipality. A gas pipeline to Toretsk is put up. The pumping station of the first lift in the village was repaired. Semenivka, which supplies technical water to the territory of the entire Donetsk region. A gas pipeline in the city of Avdiivka was built.

Civil society development: Communicable 109 settlements, 1950 streets and other toponymic sites. Ukrainianization of cities was carried out – four cities of Donetsk region (Druzhkovka, Pokrovsk, Vugledar, Mirnograd) conducted a 100% replacement of toponymic objects

The concept of the development of the Unified Ukrainian Cultural Space was approved. 26 joint projects with other regions of Ukraine were implemented. European Day is launched. The first officer ball has been held over the last 100 years.

- On June 11, 2018, he resigned from the position of the head of Donetsk Regional Military-Civil Administration.
- On June 13, 2018, the President of Ukraine Petro Poroshenko signed the dismissal of the head of the Donetsk Regional State Administration Pavlo Zhebrivskyi according to his own application.
- On June 19, 2018, the President of Ukraine appointed Pavlo Zhebrivskyi as one of three auditors of NABU.
- On November 15, 2018, Pavlo Zhebrivskyi resigned due to the lack of legal grounds for auditing.
- On June 13, 2018, by a decree of the President of Ukraine, he was dismissed from the position of the head of the Donetsk Regional State Administration, according to his application.
- On June 19, 2018, President of Ukraine P. Poroshenko appointed Pavlo Zhebrivskyi as one of three NABU auditors. To perform the duties of the auditor of NABU, the prosecutors and draft laws and regulations were developed by auditors and submitted to the Presidential Administration, the Verkhovna Rada, and the Cabinet of Ministers. None of the institutions considered the proposals of the auditors, which made it impossible to fulfill their duties. Pavlo Zhebrivskyi in his statement on resignation noted: "Inaction is not my role. On November 15, 1818, I sent a statement on the assemblage of my powers to the NABU auditor to the Presidential Administration of Ukraine and from today I consider myself free of these responsibilities. I renew my participation in the political process, including - to fight corruption."

== Awards ==
Order of Prince Yaroslav the Wise of the 5th cl. (June 13, 2018) – for a significant personal contribution to state construction, long-term faithful service to the Ukrainian people.

== Views ==
The main function of the state is the establishment of fair and just rules of social life (rules of the game). The basis of these rules is the ideological values of Ukrainians – liberties, self-sufficiency and the aspiration of wealth. He believes that "the economy of success is wealth through opportunities".

His life credo: first: in all its problems one must blame exclusively for himself, and not for anyone else; the second: every day you have to live so that the next morning you cannot be afraid to look in the mirror in your own eyes; the third: we must confidently go to the goal, to gather like-minded people and to change the world around us together.

== Personal life ==
Zhebrivskyi's sister, Filya Zhebrovska (born 1950), is the Director General of the Farmak OJSC. He is married to Valentina, an economist, and has two children, Anna, his daughter (born 1989) and Jan, his son (born 1994).

He loves to read. Has over 2000 books in home library. In 2014, Zhebrivskyi presented his own book Live Humanly, in which he proposed his own vision of reforming the country.
