= Khrystofor Baranovsky =

Ukrainian financial expert and finance minister (1874–1941)

Khrystofor Baranovsky Христофор Барановський
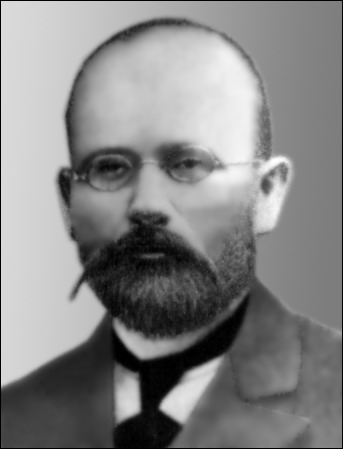

Secretary of Finance
- In office 28 June 1917 – 14 August 1917
- Prime Minister: Volodymyr Vynnychenko
- Preceded by: position created
- Succeeded by: Mikhail Tugan-Baranovsky

Minister of Finance
- In office 26 May 1920 – 1921
- Prime Minister: Vyacheslav Prokopovych
- Preceded by: Borys Martos
- Succeeded by: gov't-in-exile

Personal details
- Born: 31 December [O.S. 19 December] 1874 Nemirintsy, Kiev Governorate, Russian Empire
- Died: 7 May 1941 (age 67) São Paulo, Brazil
- Party: Non-affiliated
- Education: no general education
- Occupation: statesman, cooperative activist, financial specialist
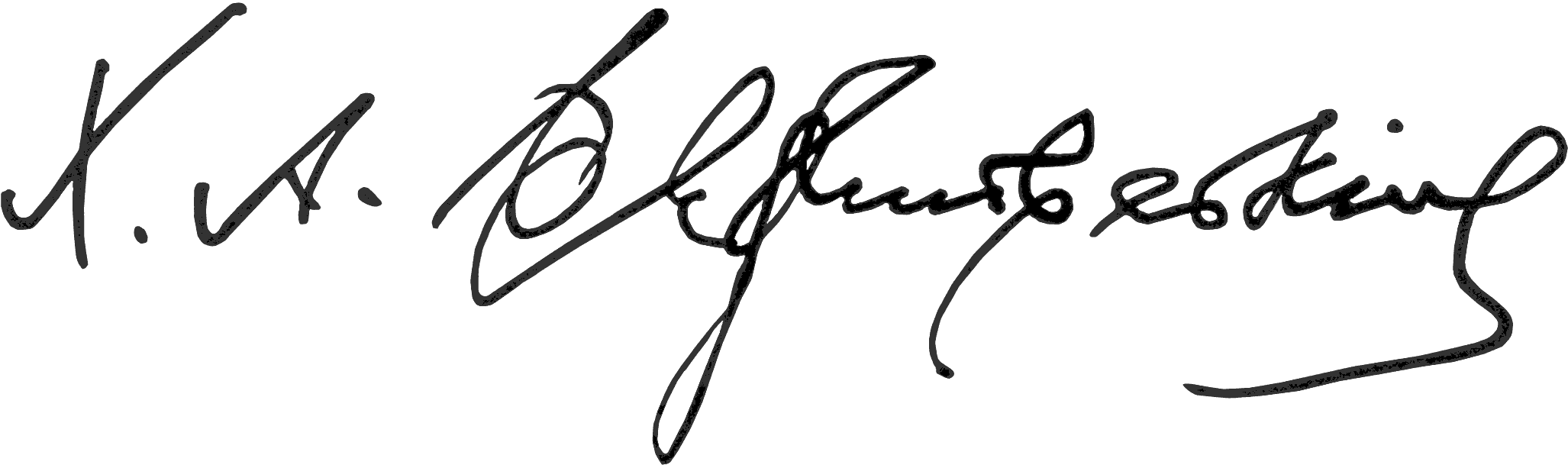
- Signature

Khrystofor Antonovych Baranovsky (Ukrainian: Христофо́р Антоно́вич Барано́вський; Russian: Христофо́р Антоно́вич Барано́вский, romanized: Khristofor Antonovich Baranovskiy; December 31 [O.S. December 19] 1874 — 1941) was a financial expert and a leader of cooperative movement in the Russian Empire, Ukraine, and Brazil.

== Early life ==
Baranovsky was born in the village of Nemyryntsi, Berdychiv Raion, in the Kiev Governorate of the Russian Empire (in the former Ruzhyn Raion, in the Zhytomyr Oblast of Ukraine). He was born to a peasant family. He did not earn a general education, but his financial talent made him the leader of the Ukrainian cooperative movement. In December 1913, Baranovsky was admitted to the International Co-operative Alliance.

== Career ==
Prior to World War I he established the Soyuzbank in Kiev. In 1917, with Fedir Kryzhanivsky Baranovsky established the Ukrainbank and became its head director. In 1919, he chaired the board of the Central Ukrainian cooperative union - Central.

Baranovsky held the chair of the General Secretariat together with Volodymyr Vynnychenko (Secretary of Internal Affairs). He did not have any political affiliation.

In 1921, Baranovsky emigrated to South America where he died about 20 years later in 1941.

Preceded by introduced	General Secretary of Finance; July 1917–14 August 1917	Succeeded by Mikhail Tugan-Baranovsky
Preceded by introduced	Head of Soyuzbank ?–1917	Succeeded by
Preceded by introduced	Head of Ukrainbank; 1917–?	Succeeded by
Preceded by	Chairman of Board of Central; 1919–?	Succeeded by
