= Oleksandr Kuts =

Ukrainian politician, military commander, and intelligence officer

Olexander Kuts
- Олександр Куць
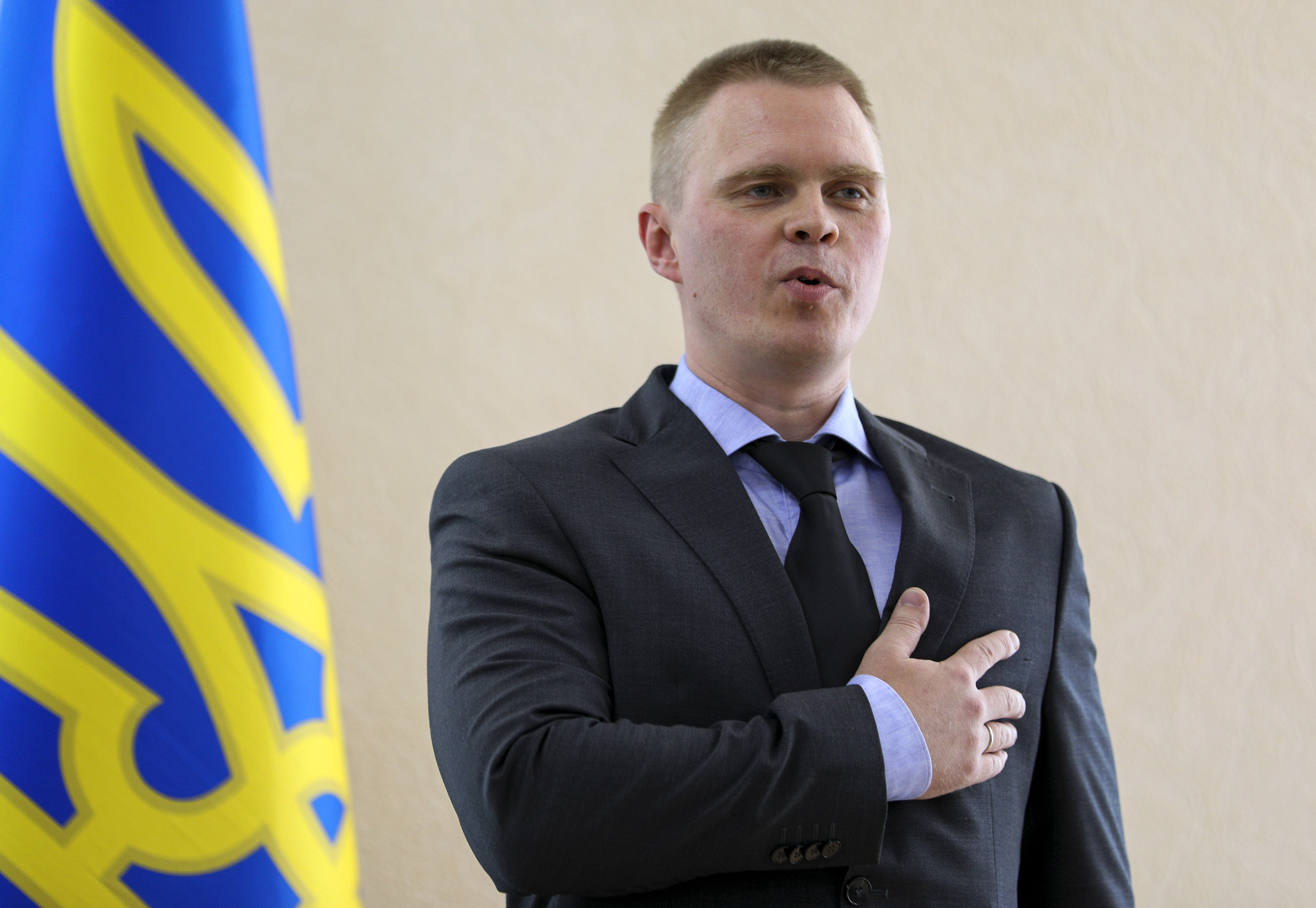
- Kuts in 2018

Governor of Donetsk Oblast
- Disputed (Note: Control over Donetsk Oblast is disputed due to the Russo-Ukrainian War. Alexander Zakharchenko (until 31 August 2018) and Denis Pushilin (since 20 November 2018) were installed by Russia as Heads of the Donetsk People's Republic, while Kuts was loyal to the Ukrainian government.)
- In office 22 June 2018 – 5 July 2019
- Preceded by: Pavlo Zhebrivskyi
- Succeeded by: Pavlo Kyrylenko

Head of the Office of the Security Service of Ukraine in Donetsk Oblast
- In office 25 March 2015 – 21 August 2017

Personal details
- Born: 30 August 1976 (age 49) Kozelets, Ukraine, Soviet Union
- Spouse: Olena Olexandrivna Kuts
- Children: 1

Olexander Ivanovych Kuts (Ukrainian: Олександр Іванович Куць; born 30 August 1976) is a Ukrainian political military commander, a Major General, the Chief of the newly created Directorate of the Security Service of Ukraine in Donetsk and Luhansk Oblasts (21 August 2017 – 22 June 2018). He was the Head of the Office of the Security Service of Ukraine in Donetsk Oblast from March 25, 2015, to August 21, 2017. He was the Governor of Donetsk Oblast between 22 June 2018 and 5 July 2019.

== Biography ==
Oleksandr Kuts was born on 6 August 1976 in the Chernihiv Oblast.

In 1998, he graduated from the National Pedagogical University named after Ukrainian political theorist, Mykhailo Drahomanov.

Through June 1999 to April 2000, he temporarily worked in service in the National Guard of Ukraine.

In 2014 he was awarded the Diploma of the Kyiv Regional State Administration. He served as Deputy Chief of the Main Directorate of the Security Service of Ukraine in Kyiv and Kyiv Oblast.

From March 2015 to August 2017, he was the head of the Ukrainian Security Service in Donetsk Oblast. And from August 2017, he was promoted the head of the SBU department in Donetsk and Luhansk Oblasts.

On October 14, 2016, with the decree of the President of Ukraine, Petro Poroshenko, Kuts received the rank of Major General.

On June 22, 2018, Oleksandr Kuts was appointed Governor of the Donetsk Oblast.

== Work in the Donetsk Security Service ==
From March 2015, the head of the Donetsk Security, Kuts headed the activities aimed at detecting and exposing three traitors in the ranks of the Donetsk Security Service (including the counter-intelligence and cryptographic employee) recruited by the Russian intelligence agency - they were, Aleksandr Tretyak (son of the ex-director of the Luhansk Security Service), Valery Nikiforov, and Yevgeny Kosyak (former Deputy Head of the Investigation Department of the Donetsk Security Service). The key role in this was played by the then Deputy Head of the Main Department of the Counterintelligence Department of the SBU Office in Donetsk Oblast, Oleksandr Kharaberyush.

On August 21, 2017, Oleksandr Kuts was appointed Chief of the newly formed Joint Directorate of the Security Service of Ukraine in Donetsk and Luhansk Oblasts.

Another Decree of Kutsa was dismissed from the post of Head of the Office of the Security Service of Ukraine in Donetsk Oblast.

In addition, the Presidential Decree No. 223/2017 provided that the list of positions of servicemen and law enforcement officers should be persons with a general rank, the title of the position "Head of the Main Directorate of the Security Service of Ukraine in the Autonomous Republic of Crimea, in Kyiv and Kyiv Oblast supplemented with the words "in the Donetsk and Luhansk Oblasts".

On November 25, 2017, General Kuts announced the discovery of 356 spies in the ATO zone only during September–November 2017; they used to work, as a rule, mobile communication. On this occasion, the general offered the Central Office of the Ukrainian Security Service to block mobile communications in the 50-kilometer zone along the lines of delineation in the Donetsk and Luhansk Oblasts.

According to Kuts' orders, they re-settled for work in the Donetsk Security Service, having undergone a lustrous check, of a number of authorized officers. Among them are: Andriy Temir (born in 1990, Mariyupol), Dmytro Maslennikov (born in 1986, Horlivka), Oleksiy Oganlukh (born in 1980, Dnipropetrovsk), Fedir Hubanov (born in 1990, Dmytrov), Roman Stepanyuk (born in 1988, Marinka), Andiry Kirikyas (born in 1992, Mariyupol), Maksym Shamray (born in 1992, Krasnoarmeysk) Ilya Krupin (born in 1983, Kramatorsk), Maksym Panchenko (born in 1990, Mariyupol), and Yuriy Takhtamysh (born in 1986, Urzuf Mangusky District). At the same time, detailed information on the lustration of the personnel of Donetsk Donetsk National Security Service, which was held during the time of his administration, has not yet been made public until now.

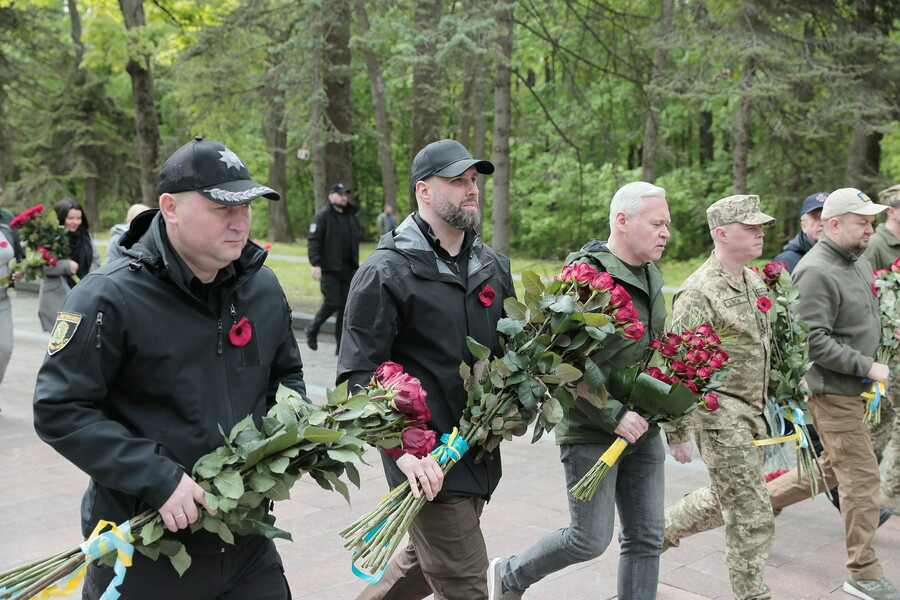
Kuts with Oleh Synyehubov, and Ihor Terekhov in May 2023

== Personal life ==
Kuts is married to his wife, Olena Olksandrivna. Olena is the assistant to the judge of the Court of Appeals of Dnipropetrovsk Oblast. They have a son, Herman.
