= Farmak =

Ukrainian pharmaceutical company

The logo of Farmak.

JSC Farmak (Ukrainian: Фармак) is the Ukrainian pharmaceutical market leader based on the sales of medicinal products in monetary terms (according to Proxima Research in 2022). The company has been established in 1925. The headquarters is located in Kyiv, Ukraine. The chairman of the supervisory board is Filya Zhebrovska, sister of Pavlo Zhebrivskyi. The chief executive officer is Volodymyr Kostiuk.

The company manufactures over 400 medicinal products. They are presented in 14 therapeutic groups. The portfolio mainly consists of anti-cold, endocrinological, gastroenterological, cardiological and neurological products.

The products manufactured by JSC Farmak are exported to more than 40 countries. Farmak's medicinal products are marketed in the countries of the EU, Central and South America, the CIS, the Middle East, Asia. The company has five international representative offices in Uzbekistan, Kazakhstan, Kyrgyzstan, Poland, Vietnam, as well as an office in the UAE.

== History ==
1925 — Lomonosov Kyiv Chemical and Pharmaceutical Plant was put into operation.

1950s — launch of manufacturing of radiopaque contrast agents. Development and release of Corvalolum; synthesis of new medicinal products.

1960s — manufacturing of 27 medicinal products.

1970s — export of products to more than 20 countries of the world, including Germany, France, Italy, Egypt, Greece, Angola.

1990s — privatization of Lomonosov Kyiv Chemical and Pharmaceutical Plant and reorganization of the enterprise into JSC Farmak.

2000s — signing a long-term partnership agreement with the American corporation Eli Lilly as a leader in insulin development and manufacturing. The company launched the manufacturing of genetically engineered human insulins using Eli Lilly's licensed technology.

2010s — 2021s — becoming the Ukrainian pharmaceutical market leader based on the sales of medicinal products in monetary terms according to Proxima Research International.

After the outbreak of the Russo-Ukrainian War, Farmak stopped registering and supplying medicinal products to the Russian Federation.

In 2015, Farmak launched a new API Production Division in Shostka, Sumy Region.

In 2022, Farmak closed its representative office in the Republic of Belarus, which supports the Russian invasion of Ukraine.

== Facilities ==
Farmak operates a pharmaceutical plant in Kyiv and API Production Division in Shostka, Sumy Region. The company also owns a laboratory and technological R&D complex for testing new and improving existing technologies of finished medicinal products.

The manufacturing facilities, laboratory and technological complex of the company are certified according to international standards and meet the requirements of European GMP standards.

Farmak reinvests approximately 90% of its profits in development. Annual investments in R&D are approximately US$15 million. Investments in business development in Ukraine amounted to US$400 million over the past 20 years (2002-2022).

== Social projects ==
In 2011, the Farmak Charitable Foundation was founded, succeeded by the Zhebrivski Family Charitable Foundation. Main areas of activity: providing support to the army, health care, education, restoring cultural monuments, preserving historical and cultural heritage, providing social assistance and protection to the population, overcoming COVID-19 consequences.

Since 2017, JSC Farmak has held the Run for Your Health race in Shostka. The event is held on September 3 every year on the occasion of Shostka Town Day with the support of the local authorities.

In 2018, JSC Farmak, in cooperation with the NGO Ukrainian Ecological Club “Green Wave”, launched Eco School informational and educational project. In 2019, the Company became the first Ukrainian pharmaceutical company to join the UN Global Compact.

== Ratings ==
- 2019 — TOP 100. Rating of the Largest — the first place among pharmaceutical companies in terms of the amount of taxes paid for 2018.
- 2021 — Top 50 best companies of 2021.
- 2021 — Top 25 Ukrainian exporting companies.
- 2021 — the leader of the rating of 50 most successful Ukrainian brands according to the Focus.
- 2022 — Top 50 Employers 2022.
