= Oleksandr Kikhtenko =

Ukrainian military leader and politician (1956–2024)

- Олександр Кіхтенко
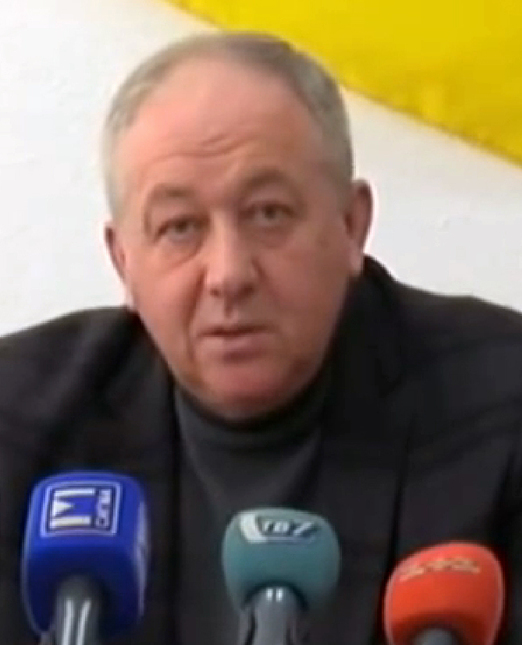
- Kikhtenko in 2015

Governor of Donetsk Oblast
- In office 10 October 2014 – 11 June 2015
- President: Petro Poroshenko
- Preceded by: Serhiy Taruta (acting)
- Succeeded by: Pavlo Zhebrivskyi

Commander of the Internal Troops of Ukraine
- In office 16 February 2005 – 6 April 2010
- President: Viktor Yushchenko; Viktor Yanukovych
- Preceded by: Serhiy Popkov
- Succeeded by: Volodymyr Vorobyov

Personal details
- Born: 5 April 1956 Bohodukhiv, Kharkiv Oblast, Ukrainian SSR, USSR
- Died: 16 October 2024 (aged 68)
- Party: Strength and Honor
- Education: Frunze Military Academy (1991)

Military service
- Allegiance: Soviet Union; Ukraine
- Branch/service: Internal Troops
- Years of service: 1974–2010
- Rank: General of the Army
- Commands: Internal Troops

Oleksandr Tymofiyovych Kikhtenko (Ukrainian: Олександр Тимофійович Кіхтенко; 5 April 1956 – 16 October 2024) was a Ukrainian military leader and politician. He was a career officer of the Internal Troops of Ukraine and a General of Army of Ukraine (2008).

Kikhtenko served in the army since 1974 first in the Soviet Army and then in the Ukrainian Army. In 1978 Kikhtenko graduated from the Frunze College of General Command (Omsk). In 1991 he graduated the faculty of intelligence of the M. V. Frunze Military Academy (Moscow).

After fall of the Soviet Union, Kikhtenko continued to serve the Armed Forces of Ukraine and was a chief of the Internal Troops administration in Zaporizhzhia Oblast. Since February 2005 he served as Commander of the Internal Troops of Ukraine during the presidency of Viktor Yushchenko, in 2007–2008 and 2010 Kikhtenko unprecedentedly was a member of the National Security and Defense Council of Ukraine.

After election of Viktor Yanukovych as President of Ukraine in 2010, Kikhtenko was fired and retired from military service. On 10 October 2014, newly elected President of Ukraine Petro Poroshenko appointed Kikhtenko as a governor of Donetsk Oblast. In 2014 he also topped the party list of the Strength and Honor party for the Ukrainian parliamentary election.

On 11 June 2015, Kikhtenko was dismissed as a governor and replaced by Pavlo Zhebrivskyi.

Kikhtenko died on 16 October 2024, at the age of 68.

Military offices
Preceded by Serhiy Popkov	Commander of the Internal Troops of Ukraine; 2005–2010	Succeeded by Volodymyr Vorobyov
