= Nemyryntsi =

Nemyryntsi Немиринці
- Village
- Location within Zhytomyr Oblast Location within Ukraine
- Coordinates: 49°37′12″N 29°3′0″E
- Country: Ukraine
- Oblast: Zhytomyr Oblast
- Raion: Berdychiv Raion
- Established: 1556

Area
  - Total: 3,026 km^{2} (1,168 sq mi)
- Elevation: 251 m (823 ft)

Population
  - Total: 772
  - Density: 255.12/km^{2} (660.8/sq mi)
- Time zone: UTC-6
- Postal code: 13643
- Area code: 4138

Nemyryntsi (Ukrainian: Немиринці; Russian: Немиринцы) is a village in Berdychiv Raion, Zhytomyr Oblast (province) of Ukraine on Drevlians historic lands. It has a population of 772 people.

== History ==
1556 founded village Nemyryntsi.

1556-1569 part of Grand Duchy of Lithuania

1569-1793 part of Polish–Lithuanian Commonwealth, Kiev Voivodeship

1793-1846 part of Russian Empire, Kiev Guberniya

1846-1917 part of Russian Empire, Kiev Guberniya, Berdychiv Uyezd.

1917-1919 part of Ukrainian People's Republic, Ukrainian People's Republic, Hetmanate, Ukrainian People's Republic.

1919-1923 part of USSR, Kiev Guberniya, Berdychiv Uyezd.

1923-1937 part of USSR, Kiev Guberniya, Berdychiv Okrug.

1930-1937 part of USSR, Kiev Oblast, Ruzhyn Raion.

22.09.1937-1931 part of USSR, Zhytomyr Oblast, Ruzhyn Raion.

1991- part of Ukraine, Zhytomyr Oblast, Ruzhyn Raion.

== Common local names ==
Hrabchak, Nikitenko, Markitan, Dziubenko, Davydchuk, Khodakivskyi, Possessor (Renter, Lessee, Tenant, Possessor), Yastrubenko, Pylyponchyk, Rozhkovskyi, Rozhkivskyi, Zayats, Krasnitskyi

== Famous people ==
- Khrystofor Baranovsky

== Images ==
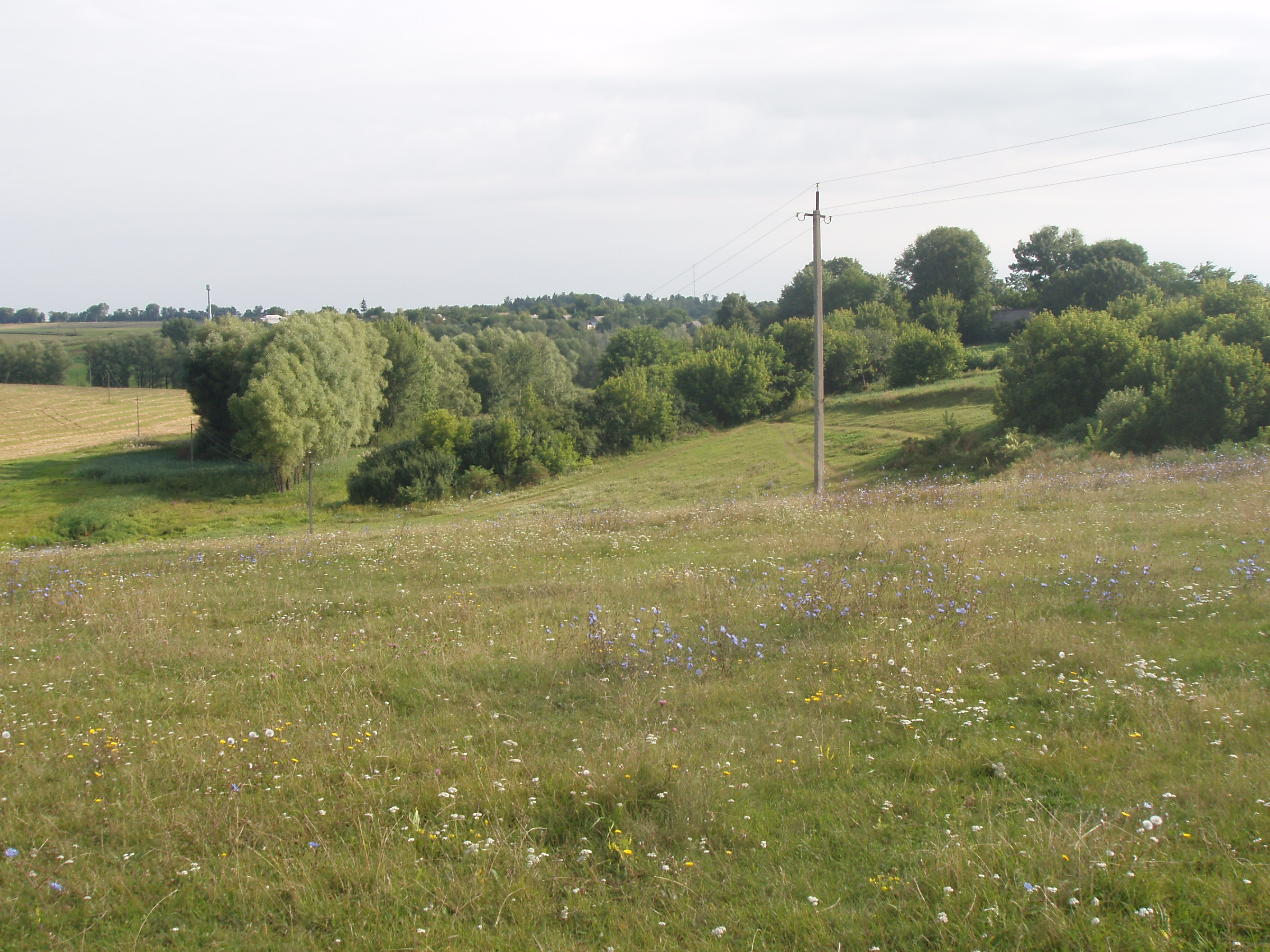
Nemirintsy01

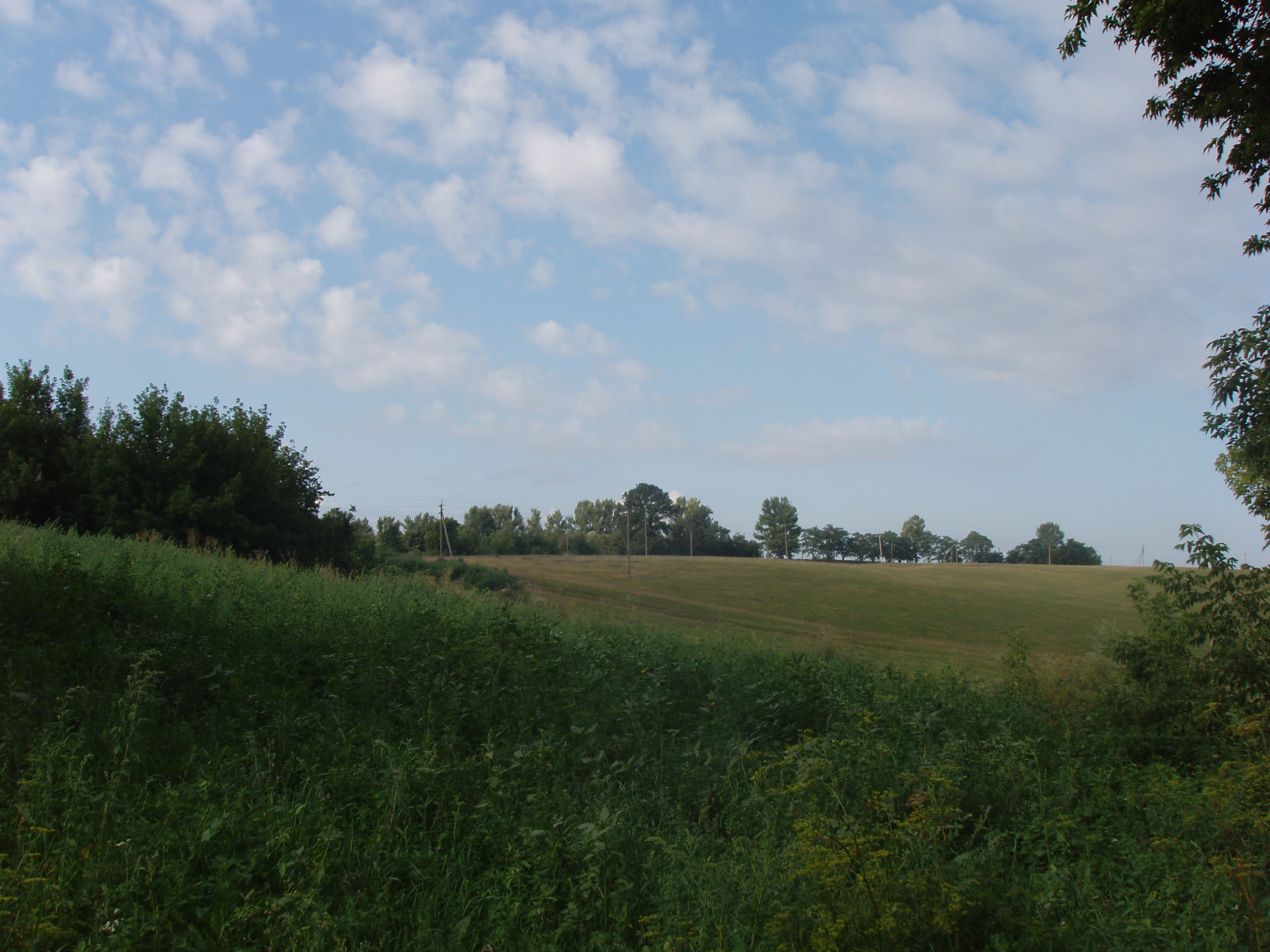
Nemirintsy02-02

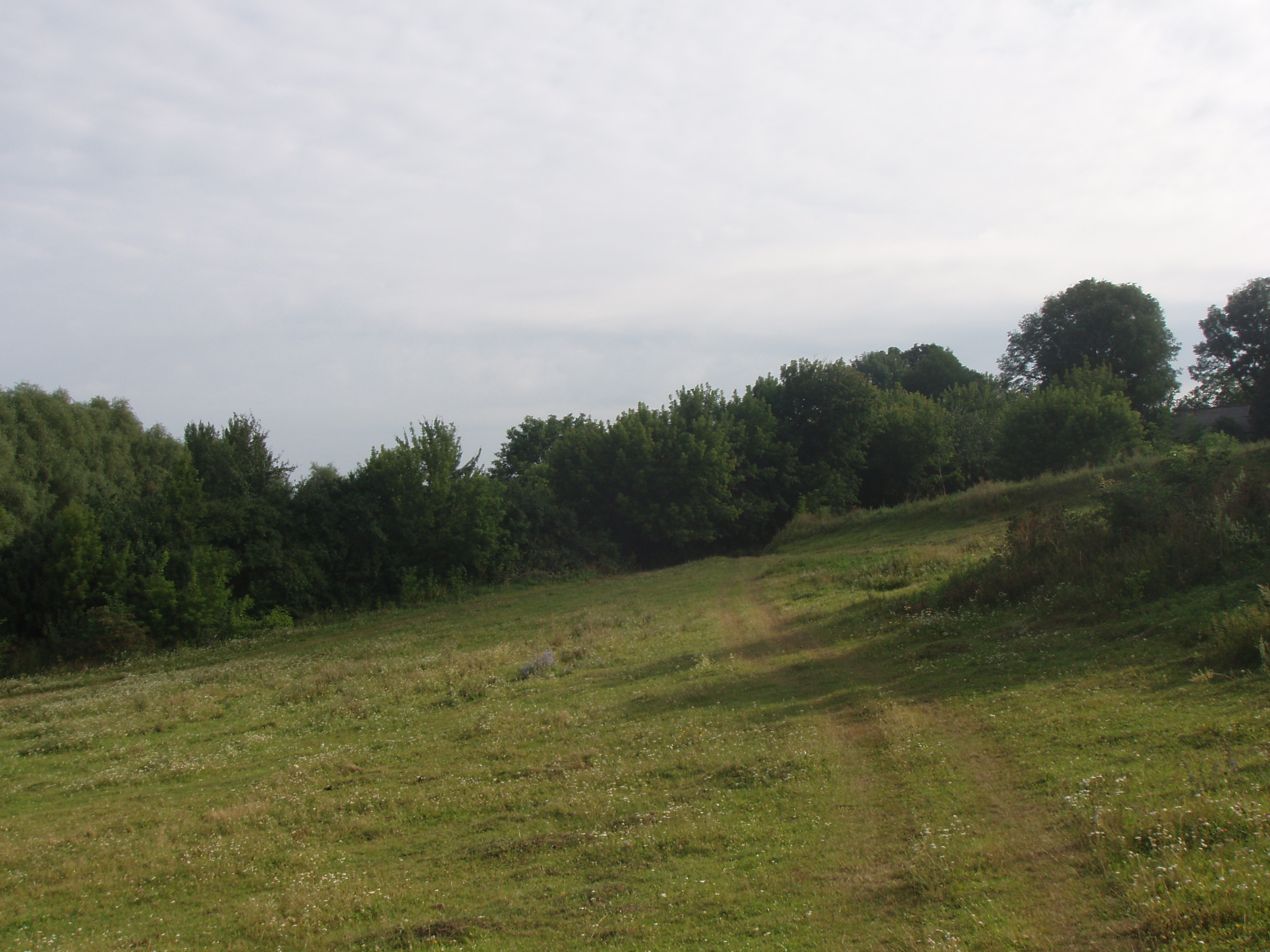
Nemirintsy03-02

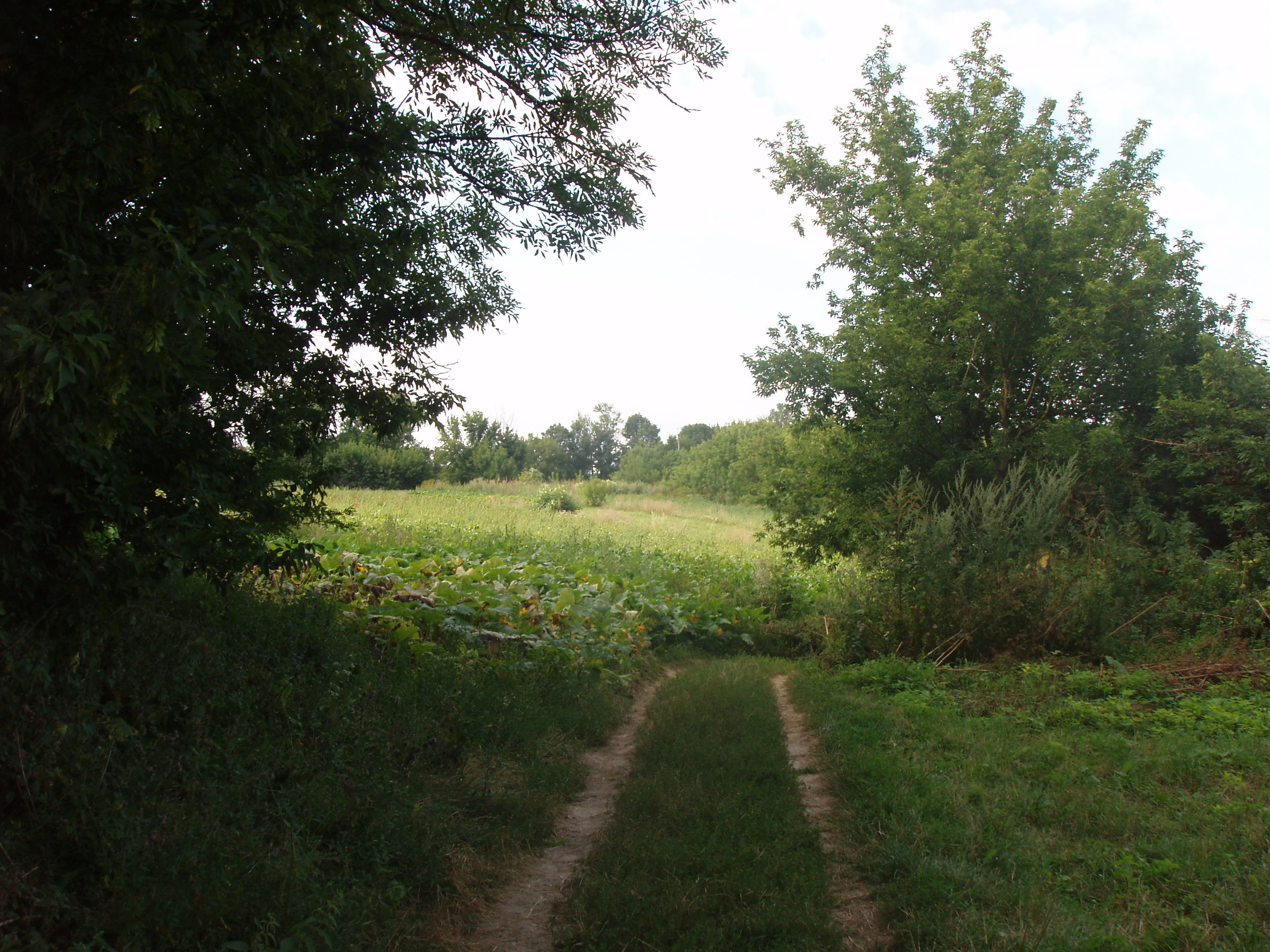
Nemirintsy04-02

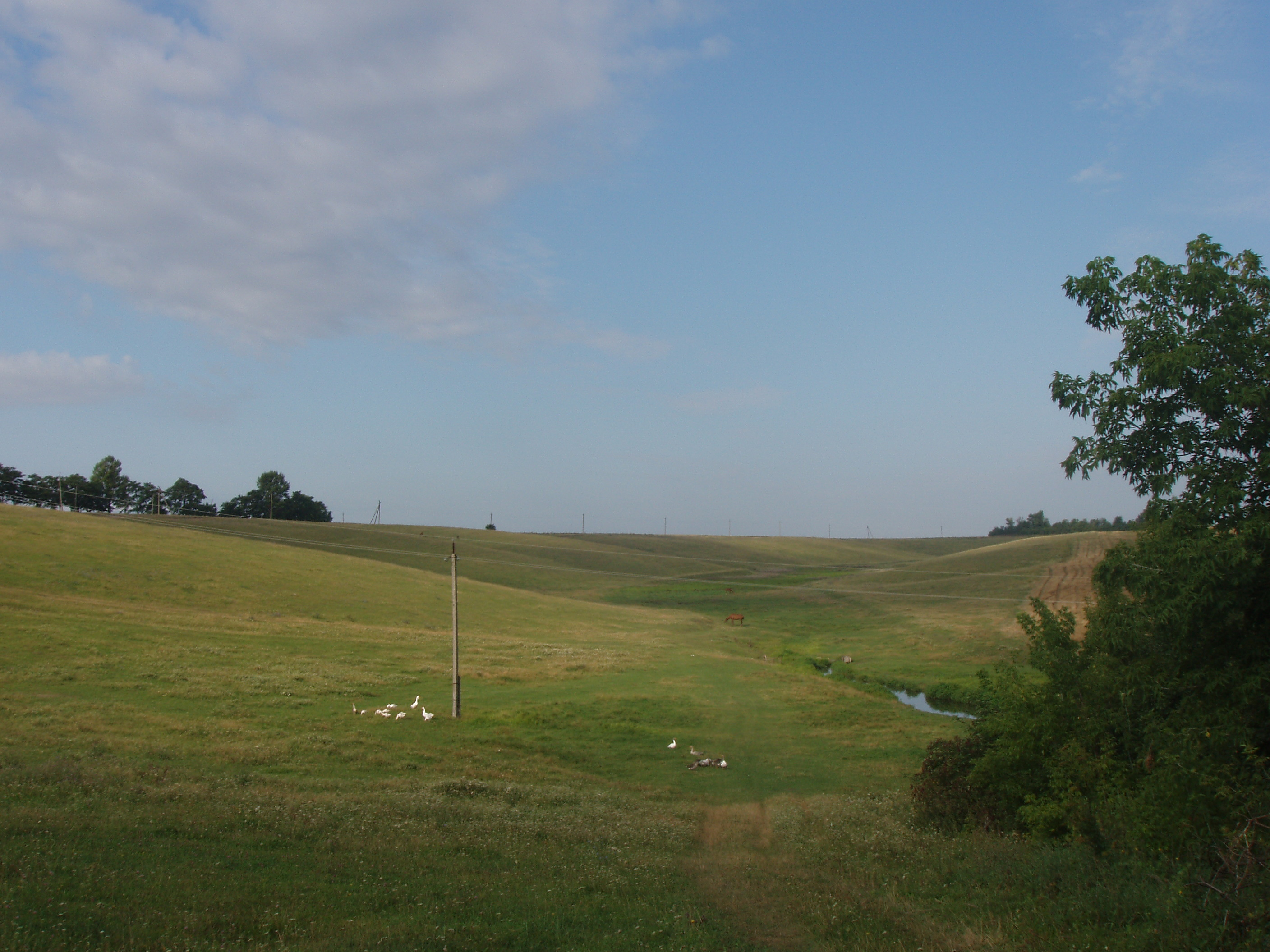
Nemirintsy05-02

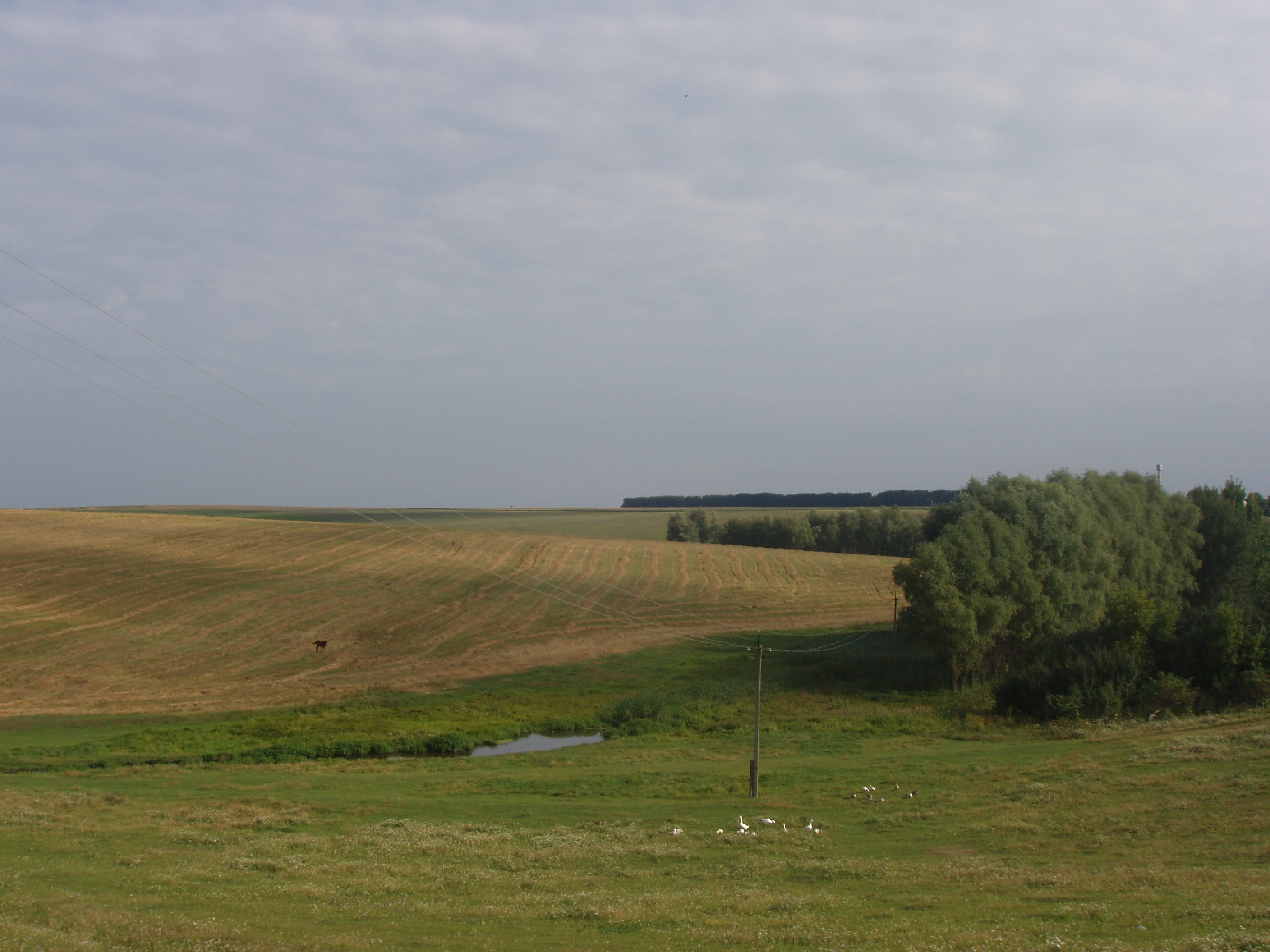
Nemirintsy06-02

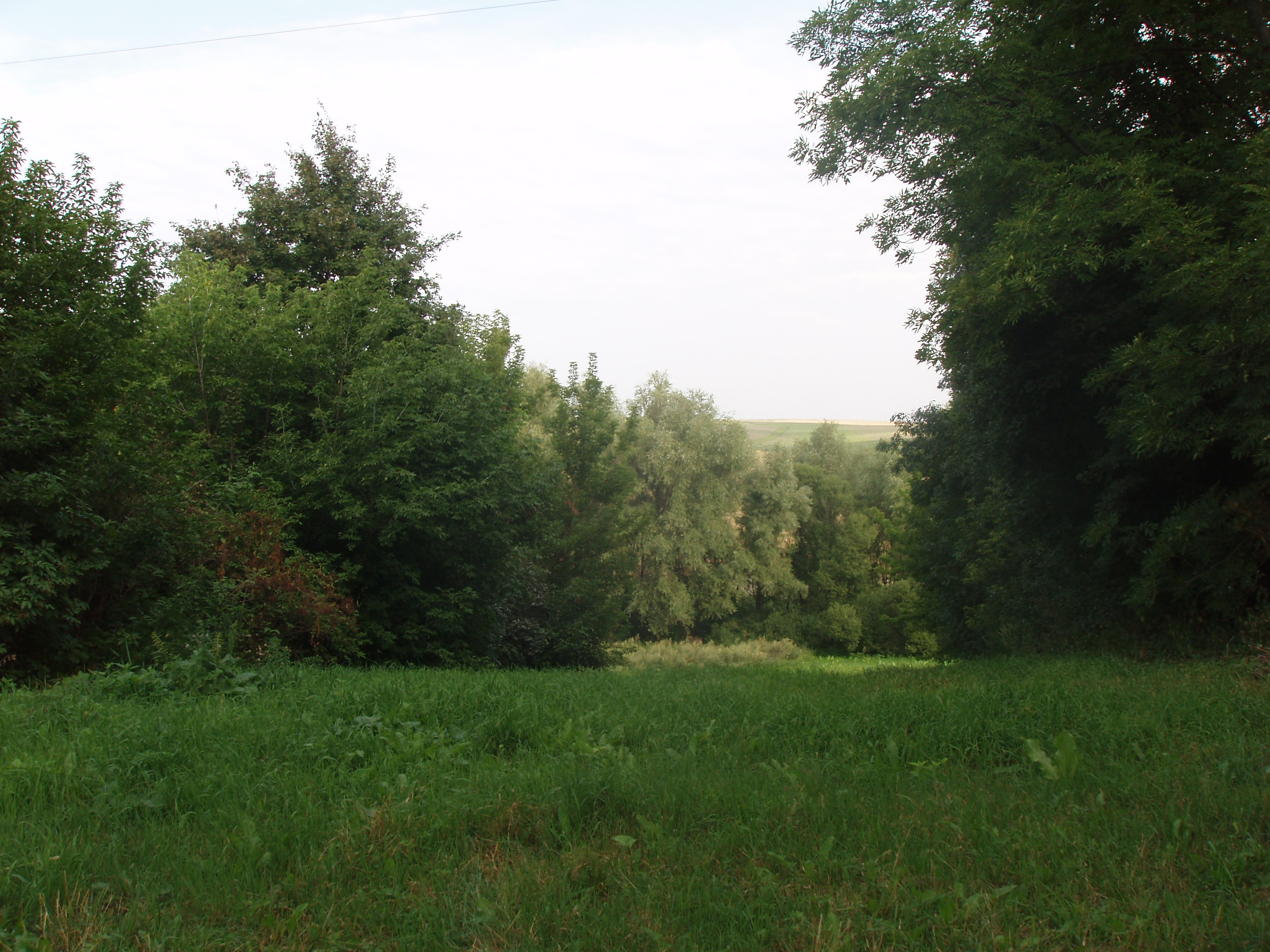
Nemirintsy07-02

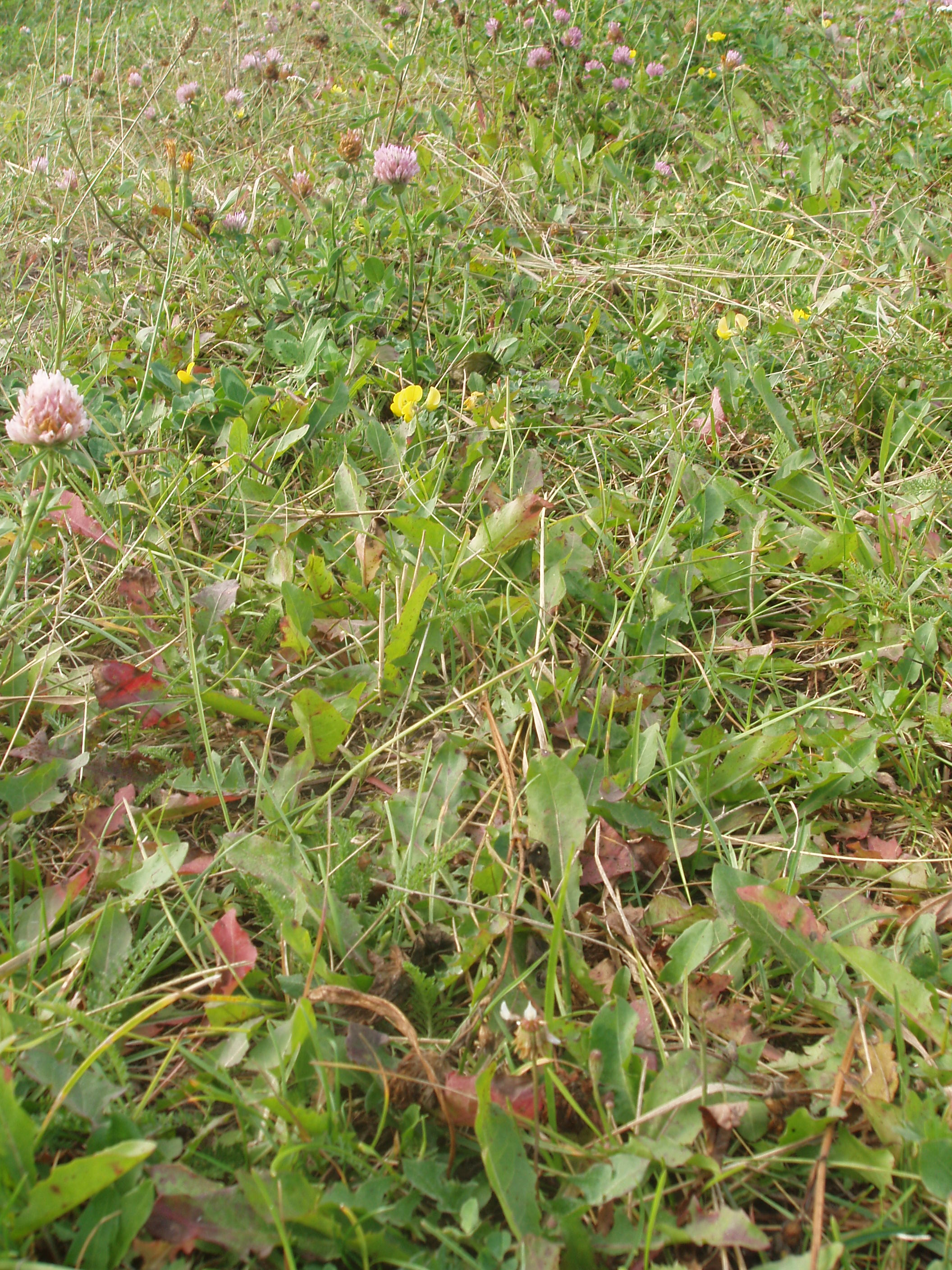
Nemirintsy08-02

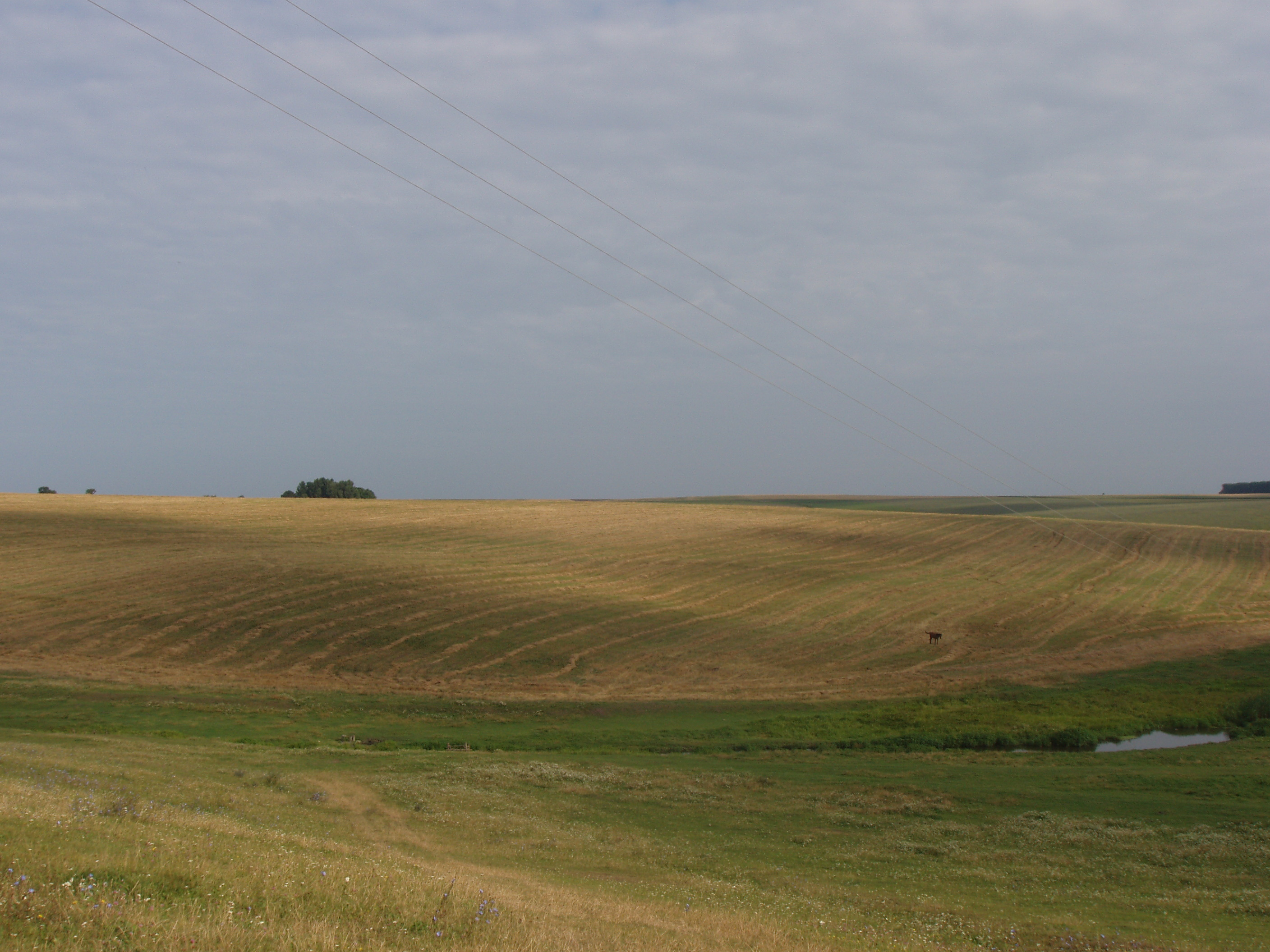
Nemirintsy09

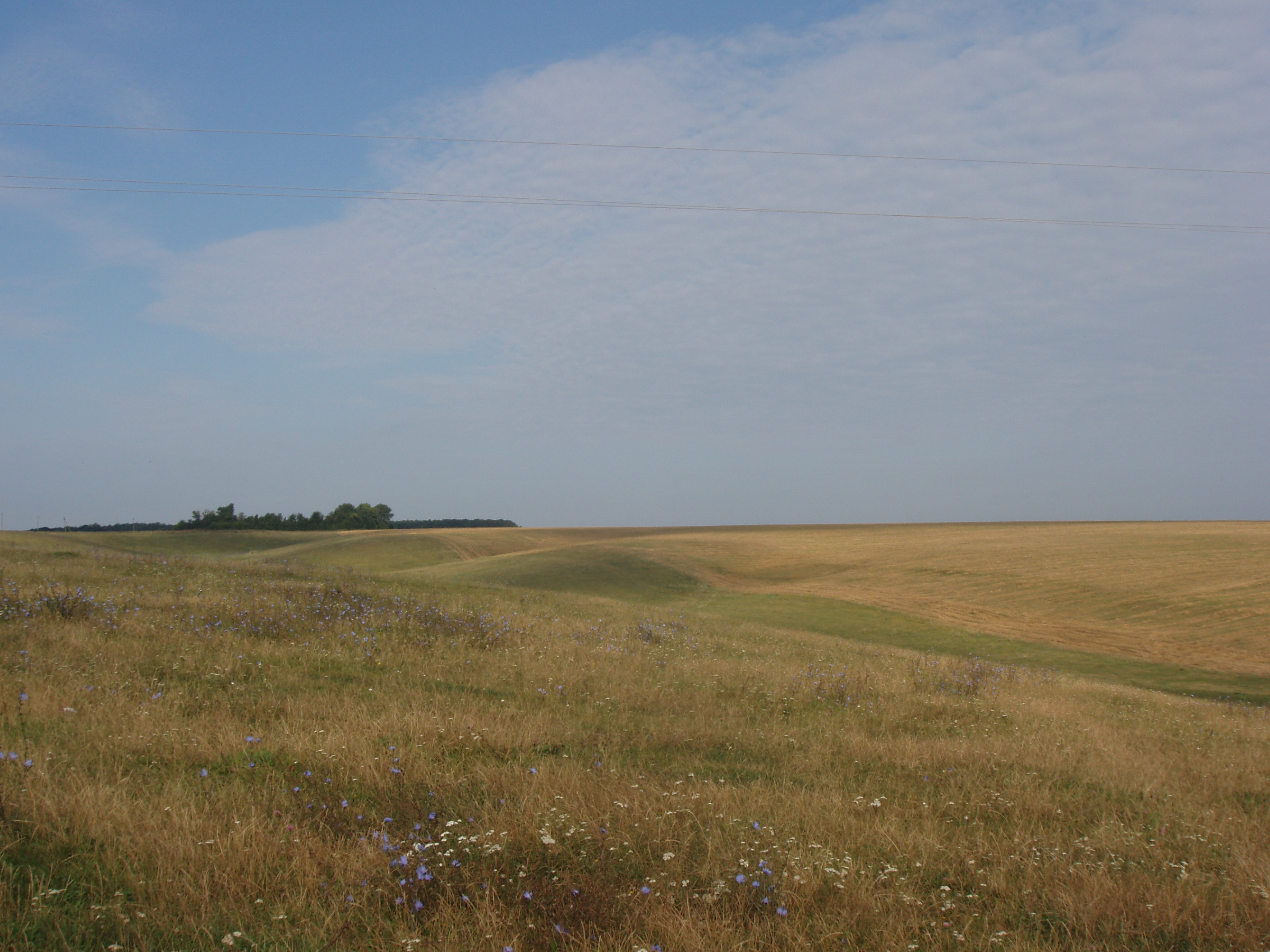
Nemirintsy010

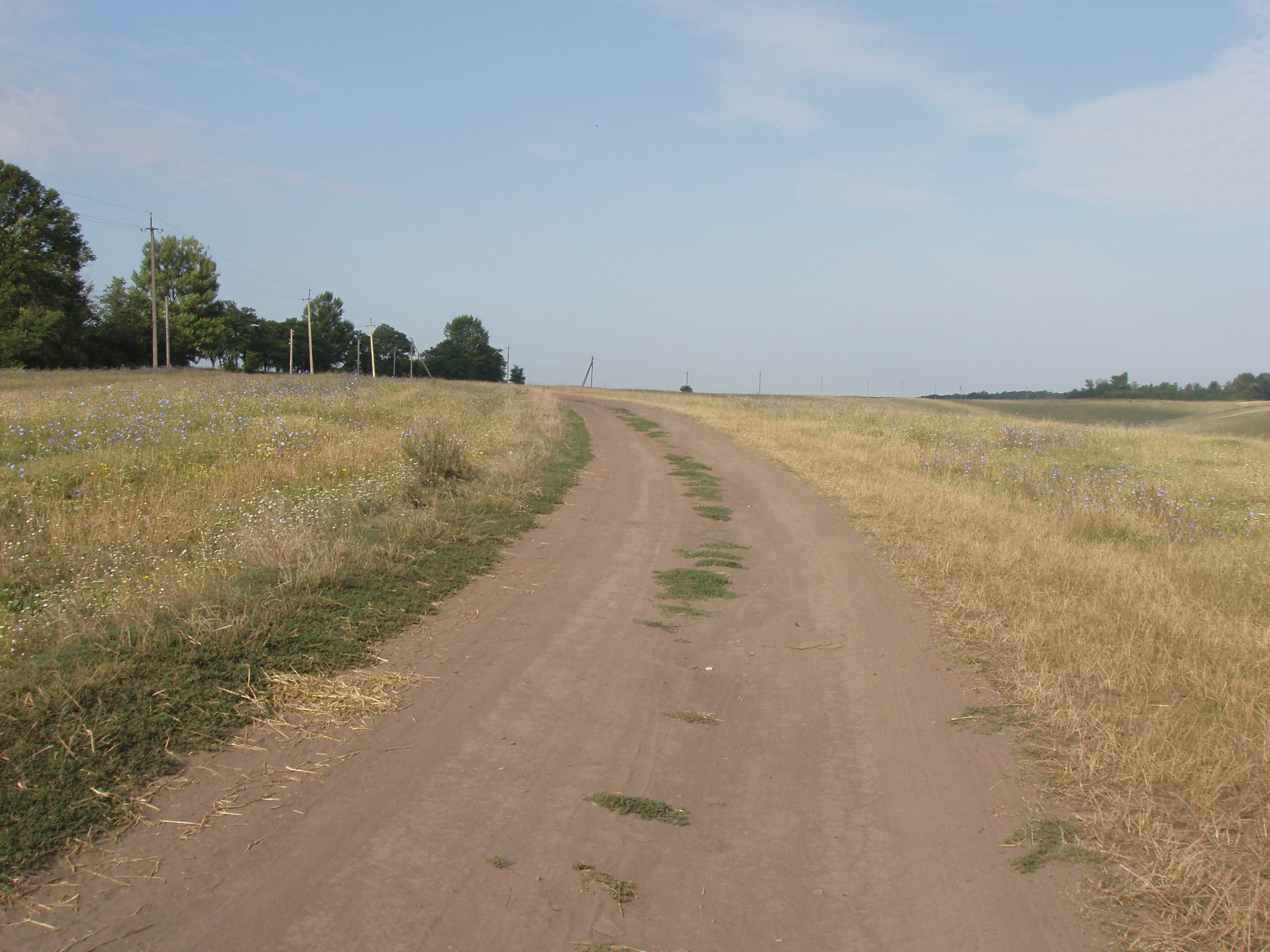
Nemirintsy011

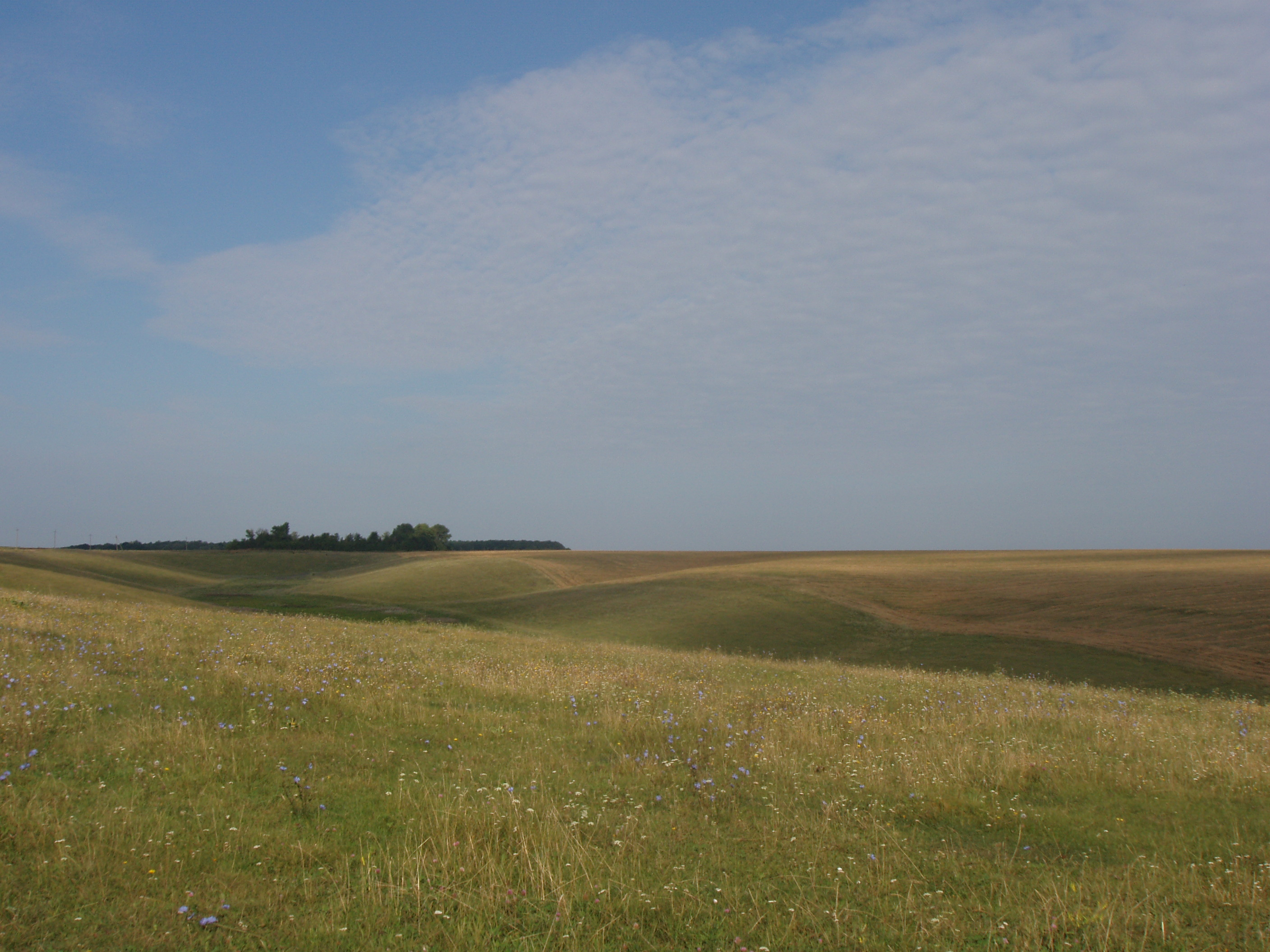
Nemirintsy012

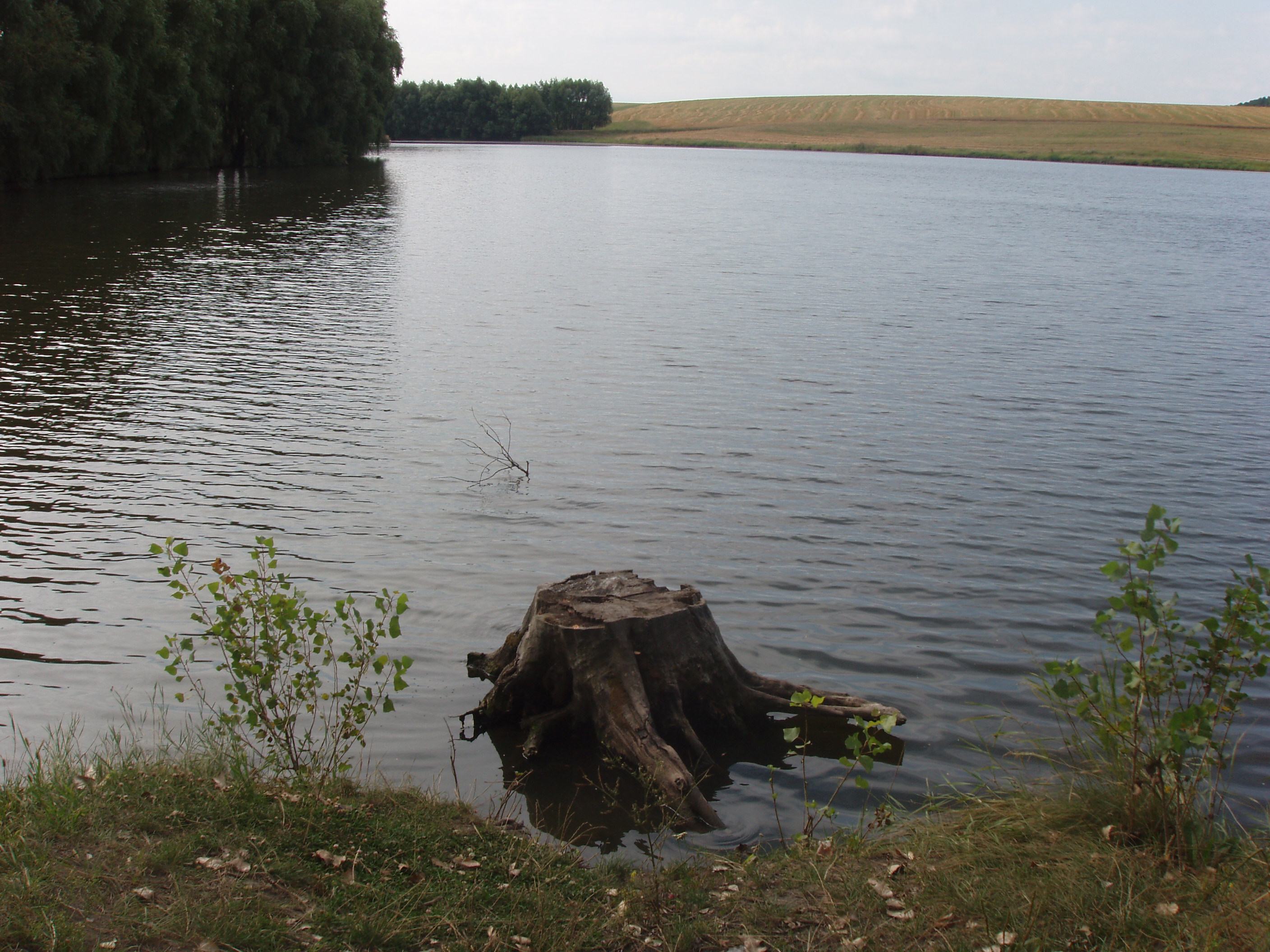
Nemirintsy013

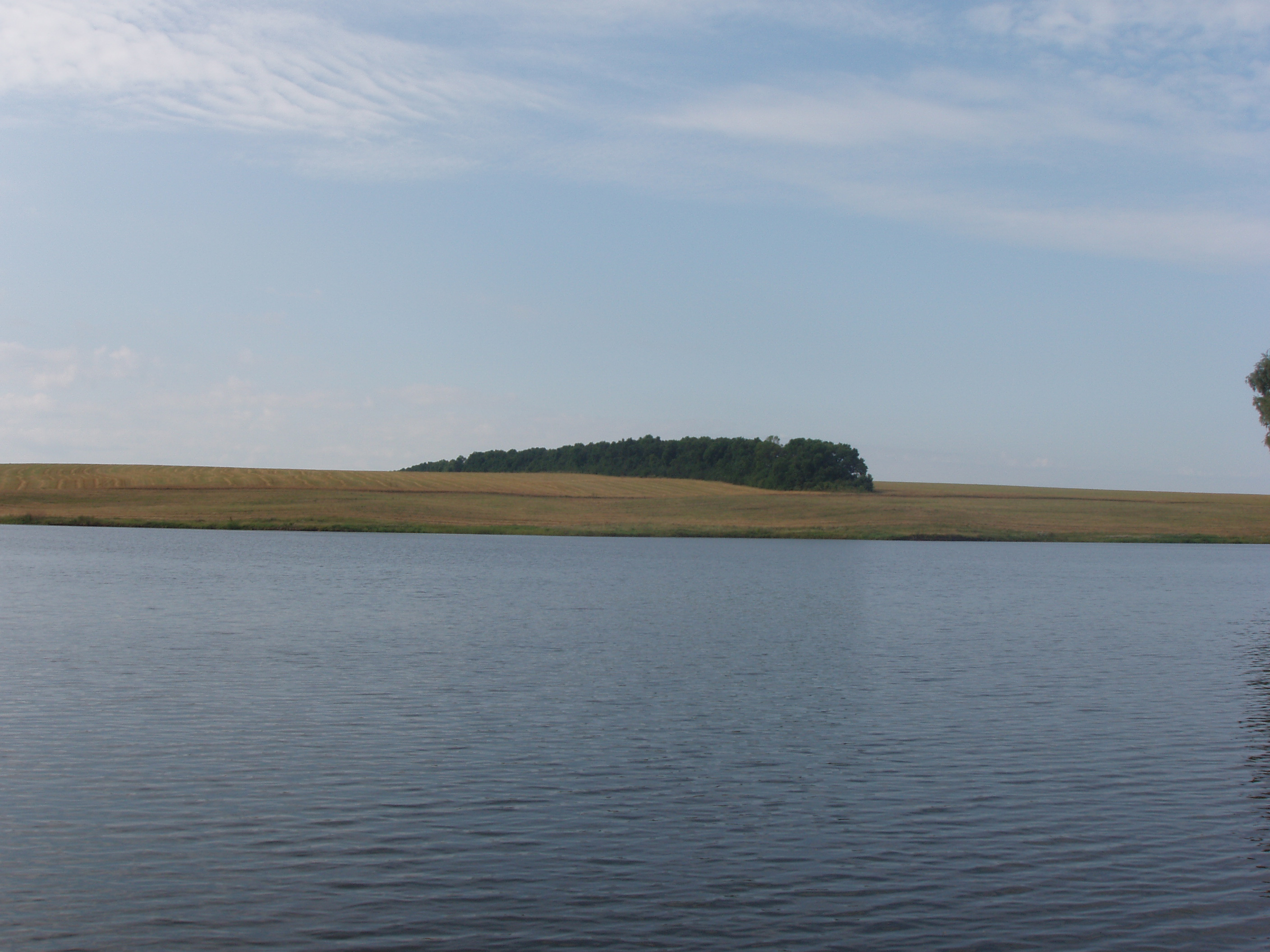
Nemirintsy014

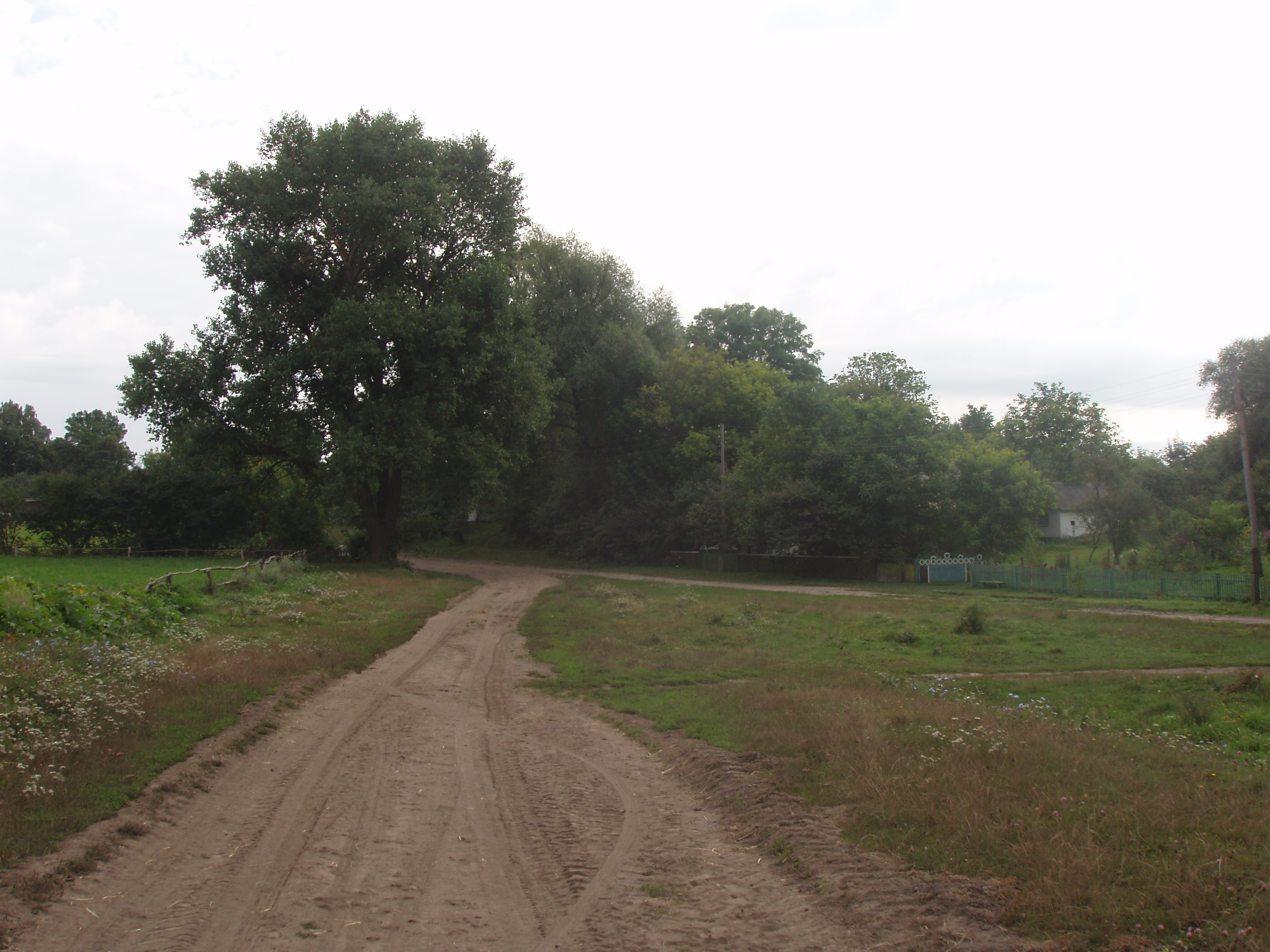
Nemirintsy015

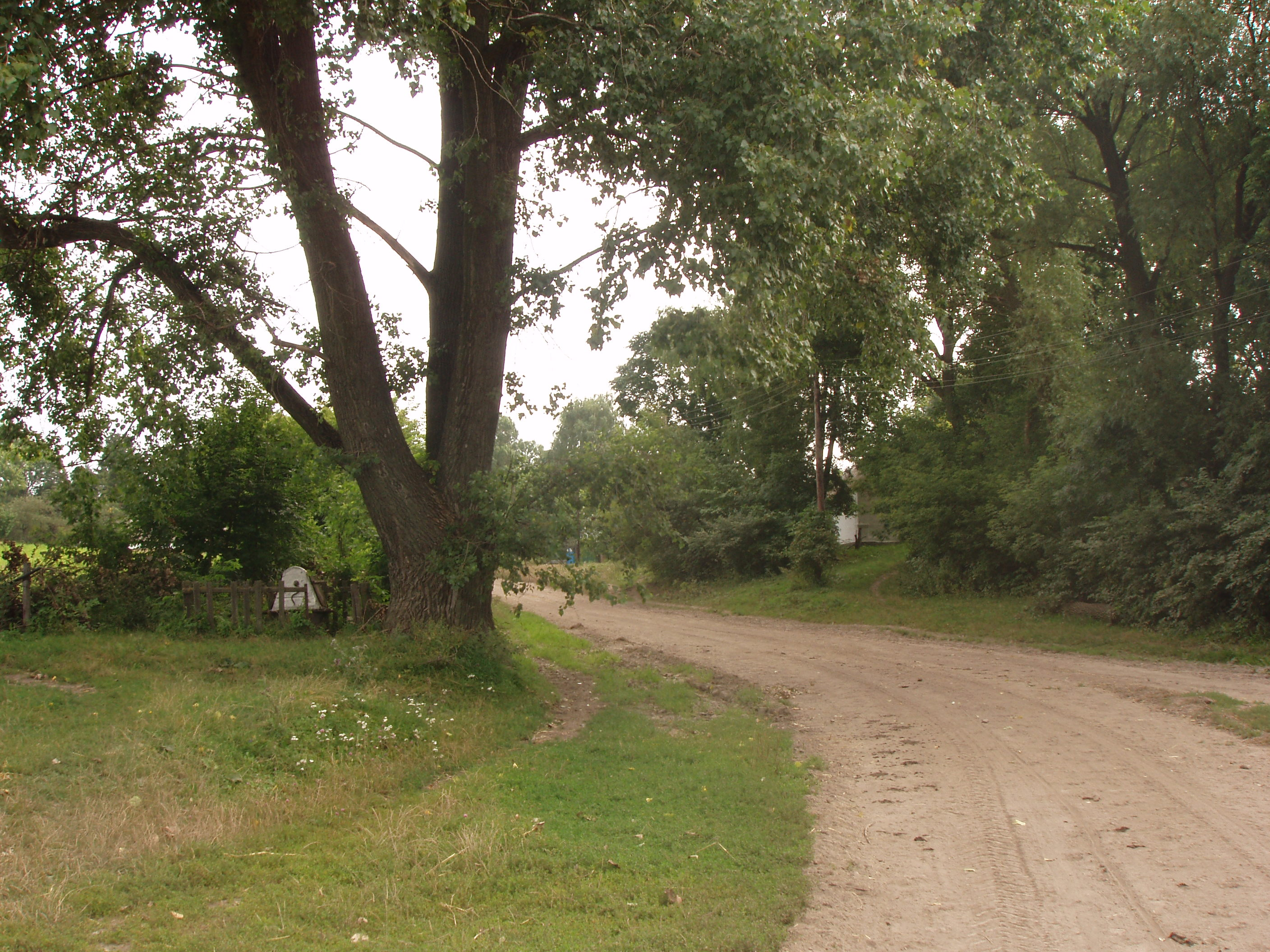
Nemirintsy016

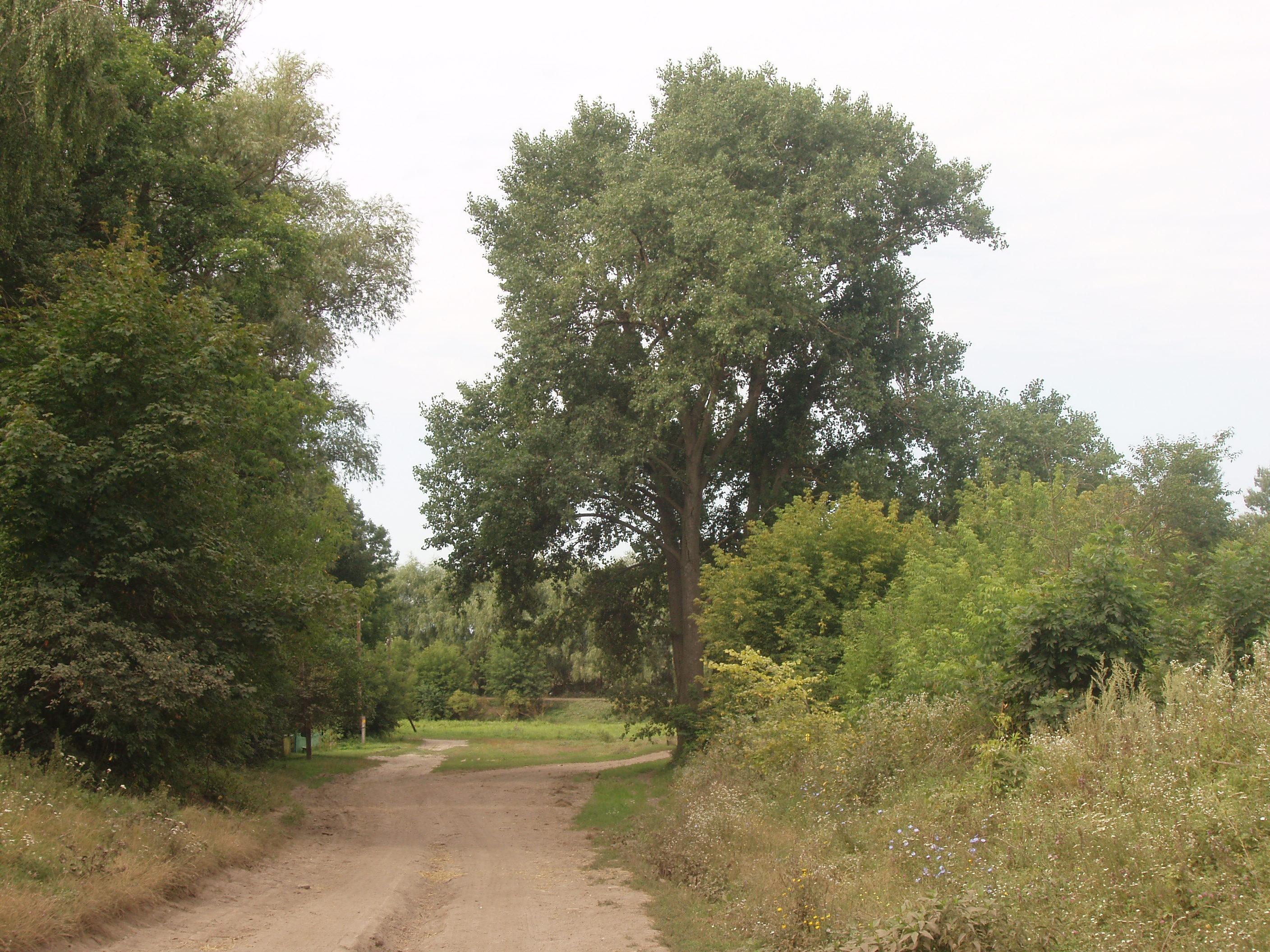
Nemirintsy017

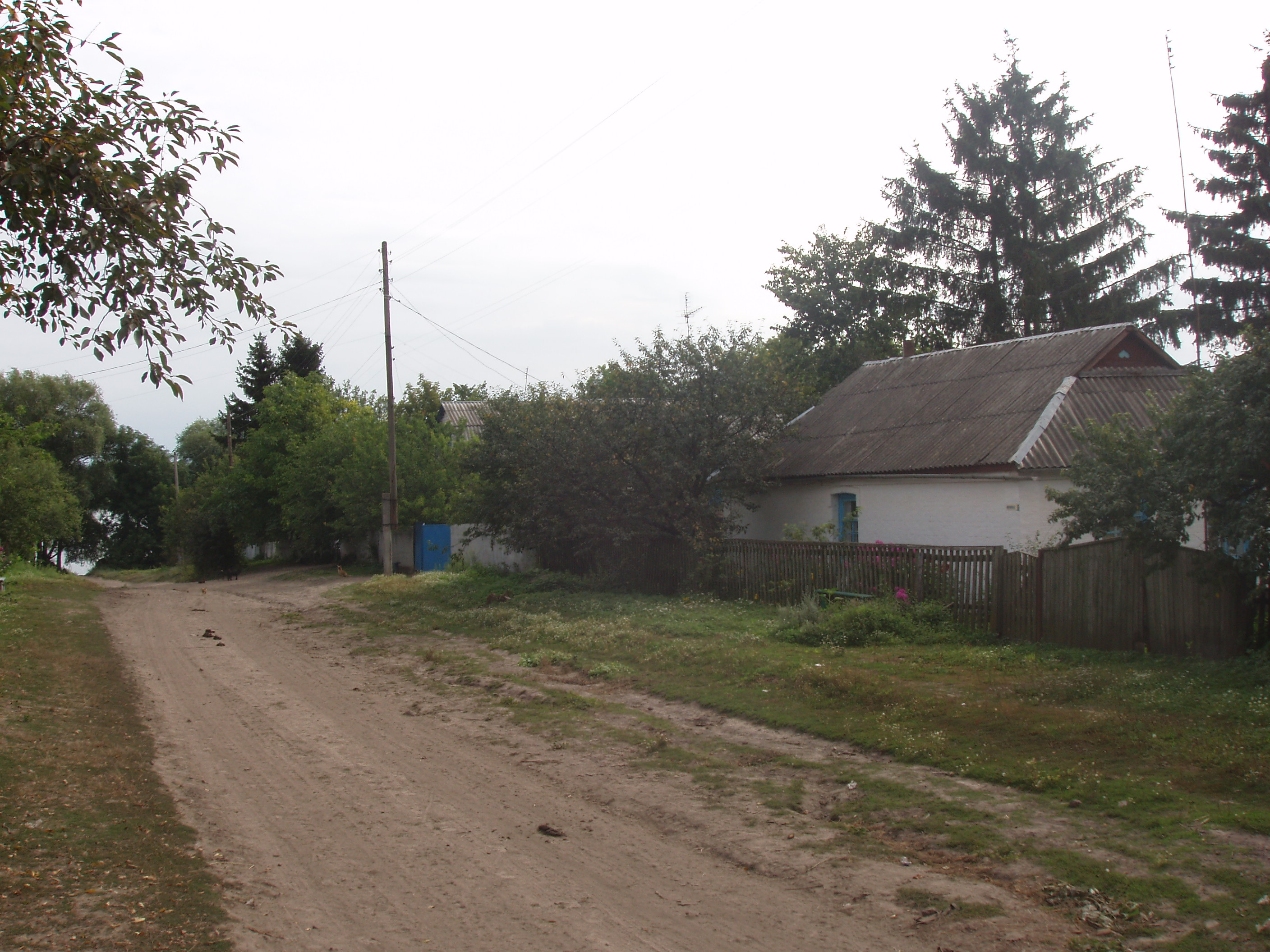
Nemirintsy018

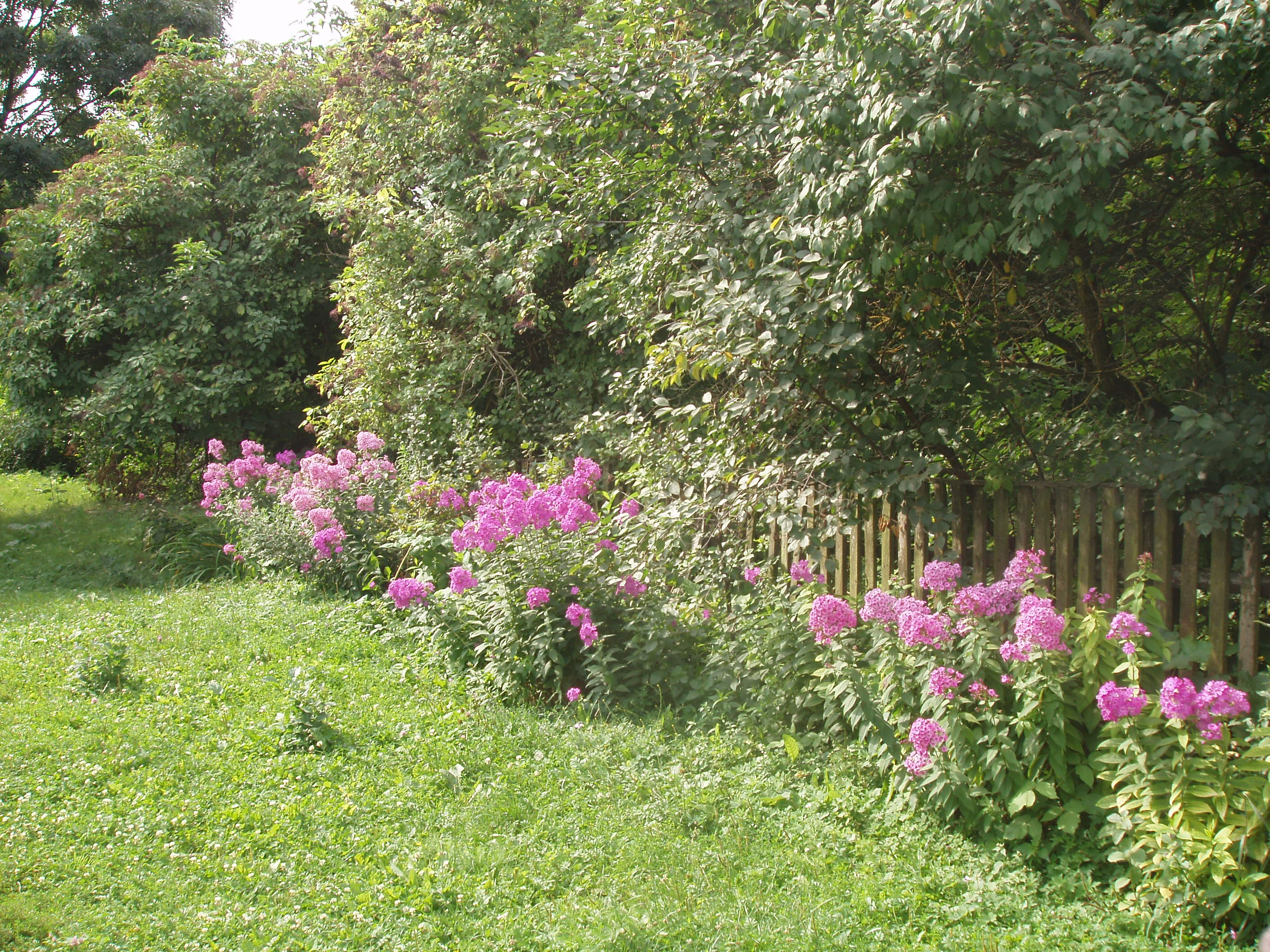
Nemirintsy019

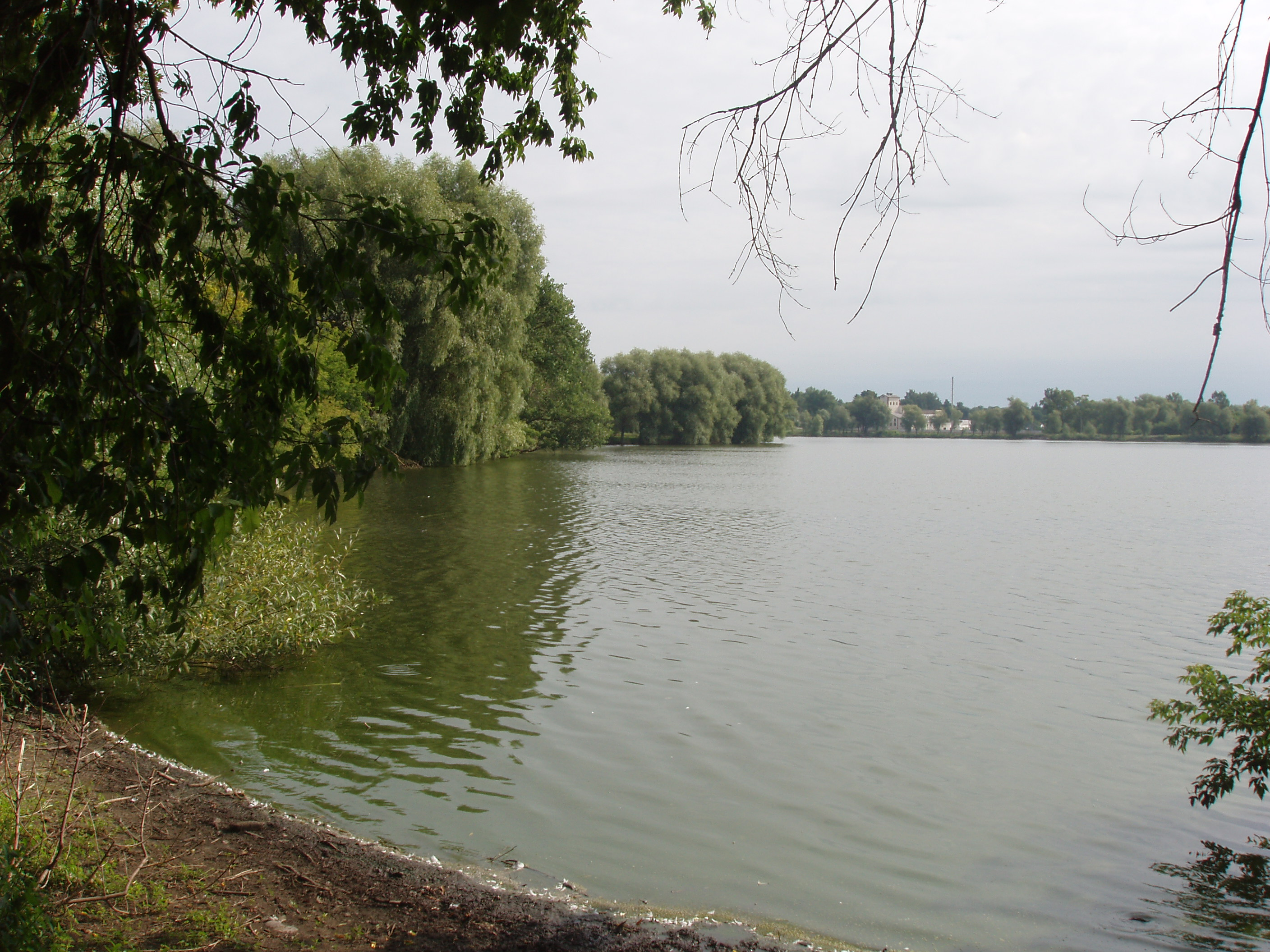
Nemirintsy020

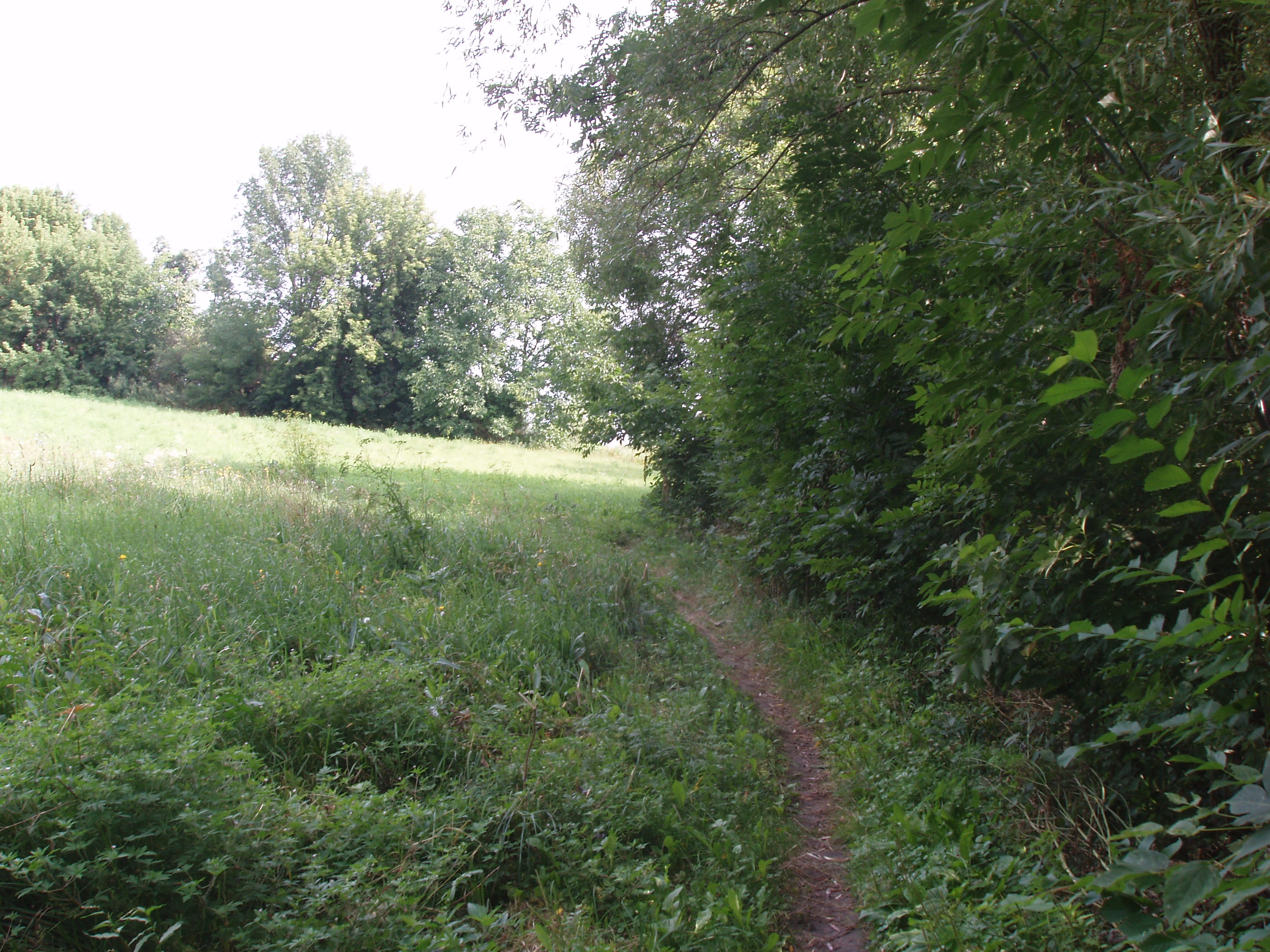
Nemirintsy021

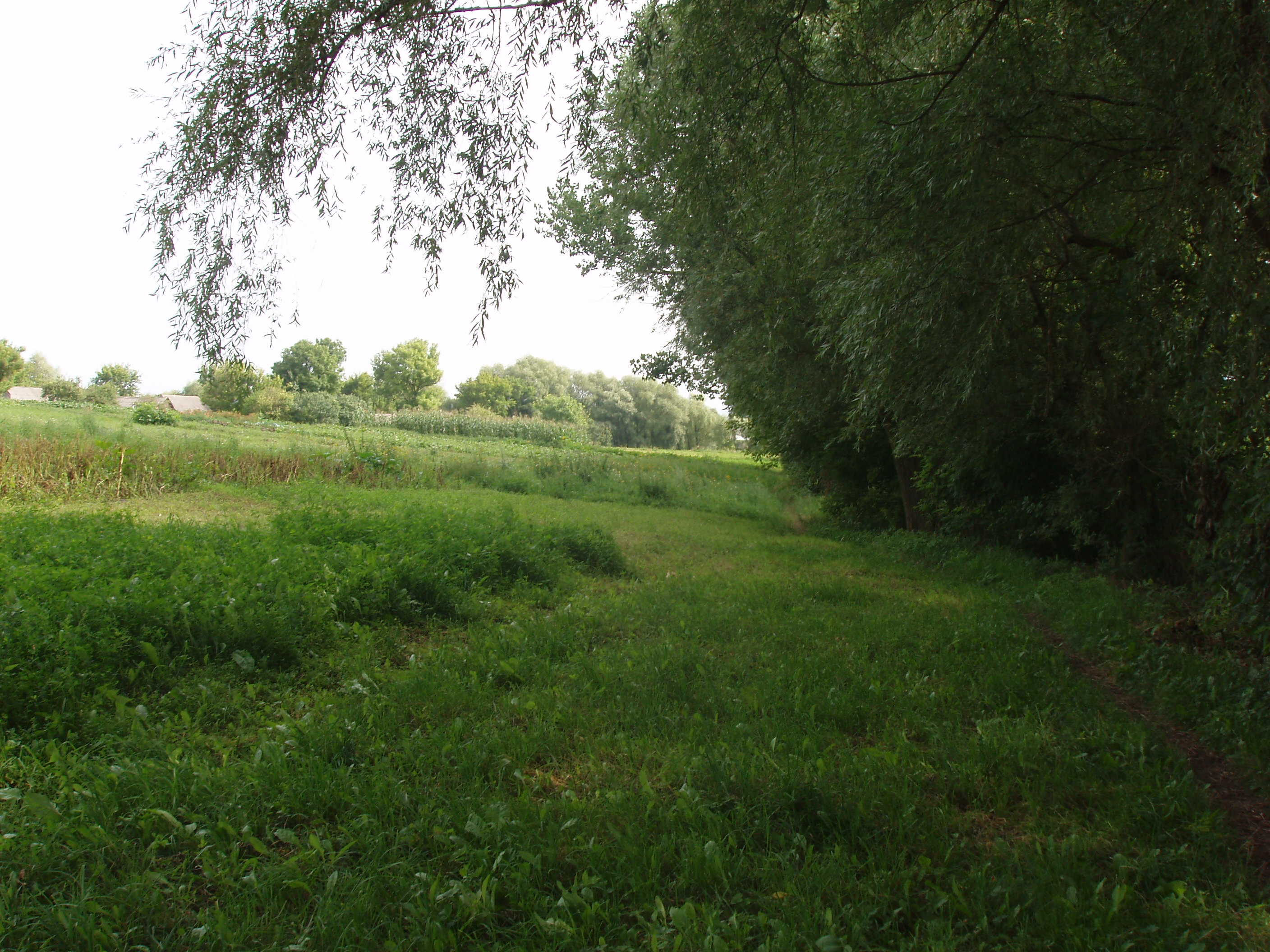
Nemirintsy022

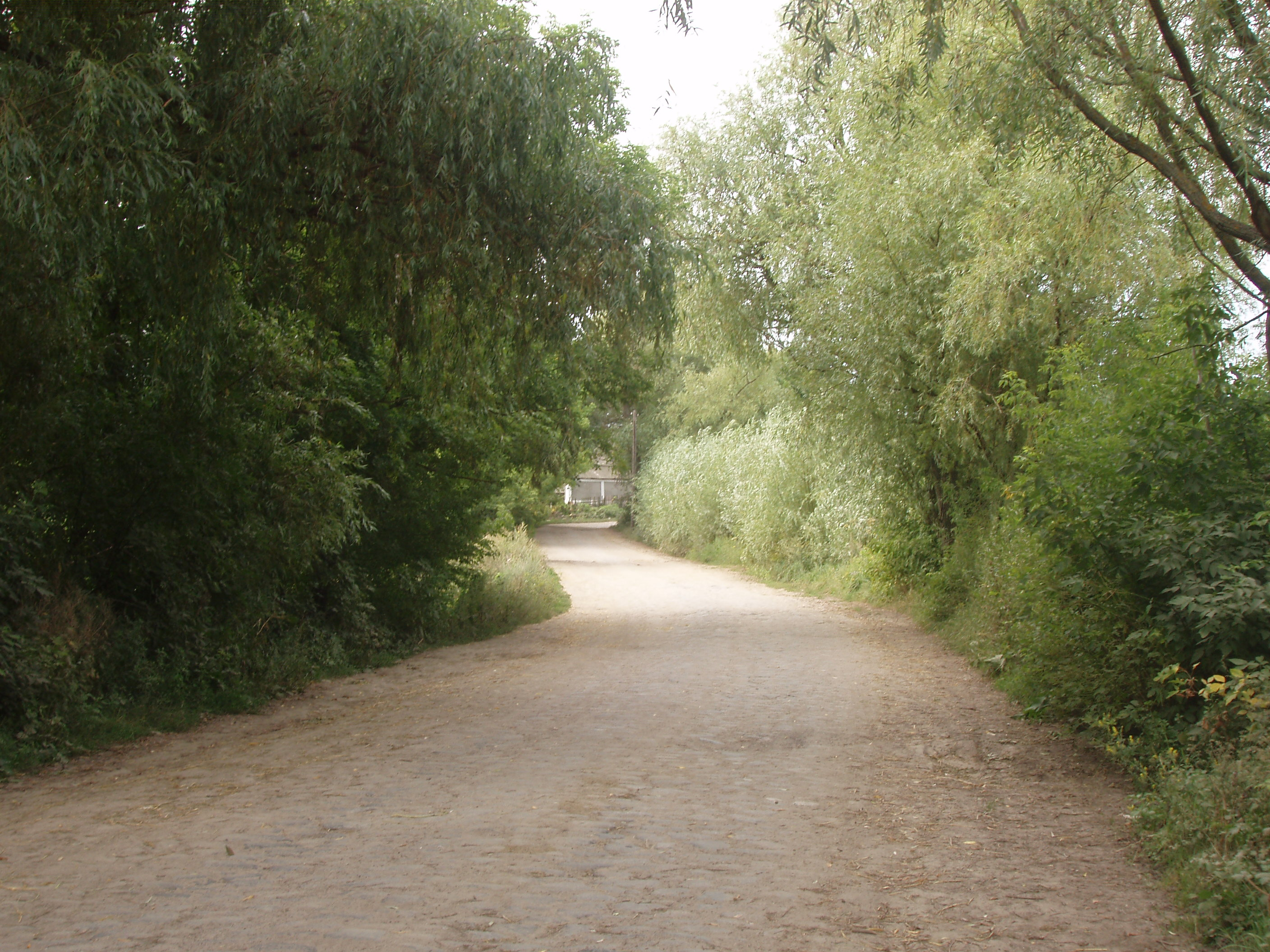
Nemirintsy023

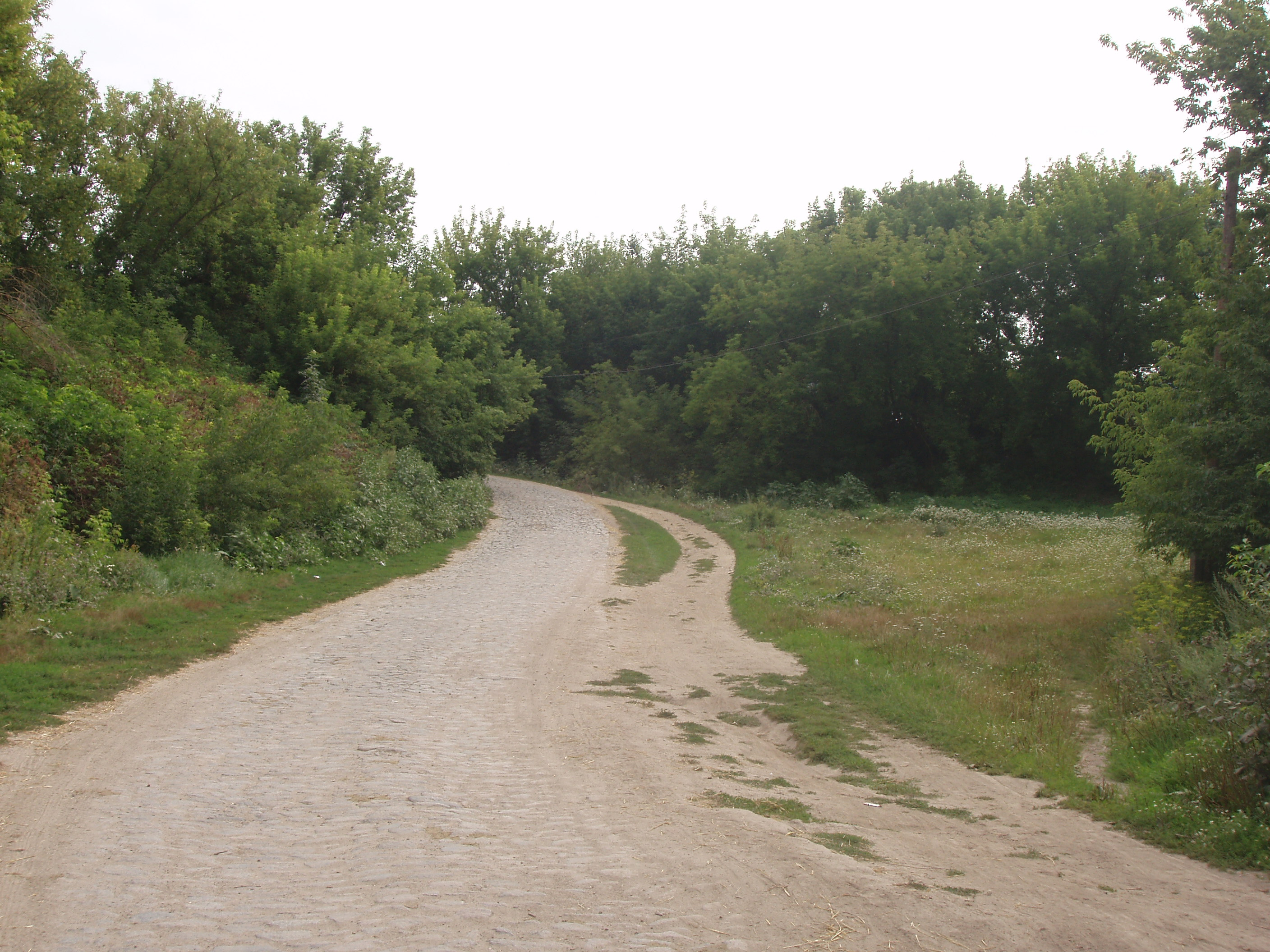
Nemirintsy024

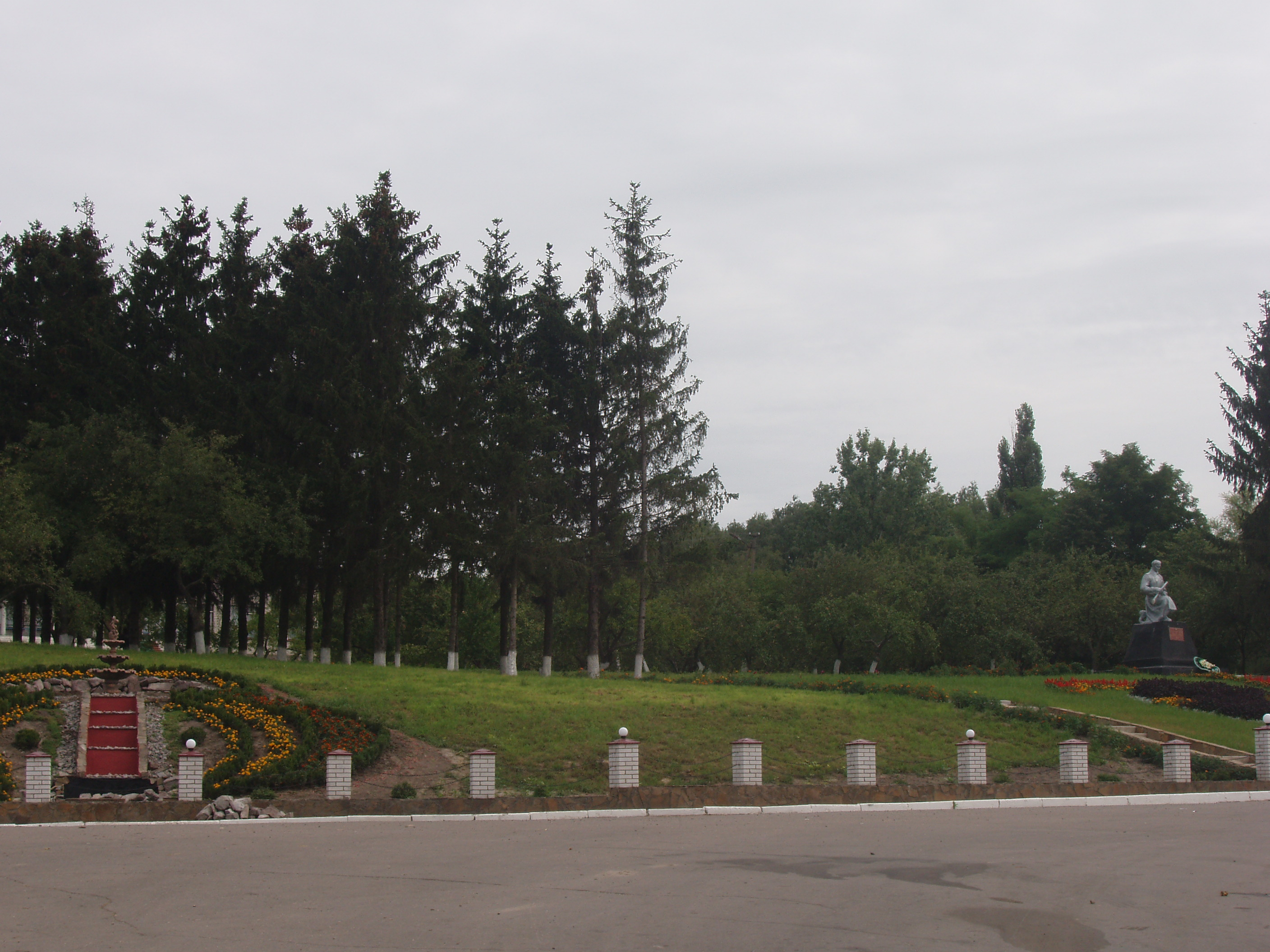
Nemirintsy025

Nemirintsy-Old store

Nemirintsy-WW2 memorial

== Nearby villages ==
- Ruzhyn (Ружин)
- Bilylivka (Білилівка)
- Koziatyn (Козятин)
- Berdychiv (Бердичів)
- Skvyra (Сквира)
- Pohrebysche (Погребище)
- Bila Tserkva (Біла Церква)

== See also ==
- Mamai
