= Iryna Levchenko =

Ukrainian journalist (born 1961)

- Ірина Левченко
- Born: 15 September 1961 (age 65); Melitopol, Ukrainian SSR, Soviet Union
- Citizenship: Ukraine
- Occupation: Journalist
- Years active: 1981–2022
- Known for: Reporting on local news in Zaporizhzhia Oblast
- Criminal charges: Espionage
- Criminal penalty: 15 years' imprisonment
- Criminal status: Detained
- Spouse: Oleksandr Levchenko

Iryna Yuriyivna Levchenko (Note: In this name that follows East Slavic naming customs, the patronymic is Yuriyivna and the family name is Levchenko.) (Ukrainian: Ірина Юріївна Левченко; born 16 September 1961) is a retired Ukrainian journalist and political prisoner who was a local journalist in Zaporizhzhia Oblast for forty years. In 2023 she was detained by Russian authorities on charges of espionage. In 2026, Levchenko was found guilty and sentenced to 15 years in prison, with the charges against her and her sentence criticised by human rights groups as being politically motivated.

== Journalism career ==
Levchenko was born and raised in Melitopol, Zaporizhzhia Oblast. She began working as a journalist in 1981, writing for various outlets including Noviy Den, Mltpl.City, and Fakty ta Komentari, and was a member of the National Union of Journalists of Ukraine. Following the Russian invasion of Ukraine in 2022 and subsequent occupation of Melitopol, Levchenko retired as a journalist. She and her husband Oleksandr, a retired engineer, opted to remain living in Melitopol, while other family members, including Levchenko's sister, fled to Kyiv.

== Arrest and imprisonment ==
On 6 May 2023, Levchenko and her husband were detained on a street in Melitopol by Russian authorities on terrorism charges. Initially held together, they were later separated, and Oleksandr was released from custody in August 2024. Levchenko was held in pre-trial detention, initially in Melitopol, before being moved to Donetsk in 2025, and Simferopol in 2026. During her detention, Levchenko was allegedly held in poor conditions, including sharing a cell with six women and having limited access to medical care. Levchenko's family did not hear from her until July 2025, by which point she had been detained for two years; subsequent contact between her and her family was made possible through short letters delivered by volunteers.

In June 2023, the National Union of Journalists of Ukraine, the International Federation of Journalists, and the European Federation of Journalists issued a joint statement calling for Levchenko's immediate release. In March 2026, shortly after Russian authorities announced that Levchenko had been formally charged with espionage, the Committee to Protect Journalists publicly called on the United States Congress and the administration of the President of the United States, Donald Trump, to "prioritise" the release of Ukrainian journalists detained by Russia, including Levchenko and Anastastiya Glukhovska. In May 2026, Reporters Without Borders called for Levchenko's "immediate and unconditional release", stating that she had been detained in retaliation for her "past services to the news media and for her independence in her work".

Levchenko's trial took place at the Zaporizhzhia Regional Court in September 2026. The court only identified her as "L., born in 1961", but Levchenko was positively identified in accompanying footage of the court proceedings. During the trial, Levchenko gave testimony that she had been subjected to electric shocks while being interrogated in Melitopol in August 2023 by members of the Federal Security Service. She also reported seeing agents physically assault male detainees, including her husband; beating Olha Kapralova, a female inmate; and trying to knock the teeth out of Kapralova's husband, Hennadii Kapralov. On 4 September, the court sentenced Levchenko to 15 years in prison after finding her guilty of "passing information onto Ukrainian intelligence services". She is currently serving her sentence in Mariupol.

On 30 September 2026, Levchenko's sister reported that Levchenko's appeal against her sentence had been unsuccessful, with the court upholding her sentence.

== Response ==
Levchenko's trial and sentence was criticised by national and international human rights groups. The Committee to Protect Journalists described Levchenko's sentence as "an outrageous abuse of the criminal justice system" and called on Russian authorities to release her, and other Ukrainian media workers detained by Russia. Sergiy Tomilenko, the president of the National Union of Journalists of Ukraine, also called for Levchenko's release, describing her sentence as illegal. Levchenko's family released a statement expressing their "despair" at the sentence, with her sister describing it as a "hidden death sentence" due to Levchenko not being eligible for release until she turned 80.
