= Sergei Udovik =

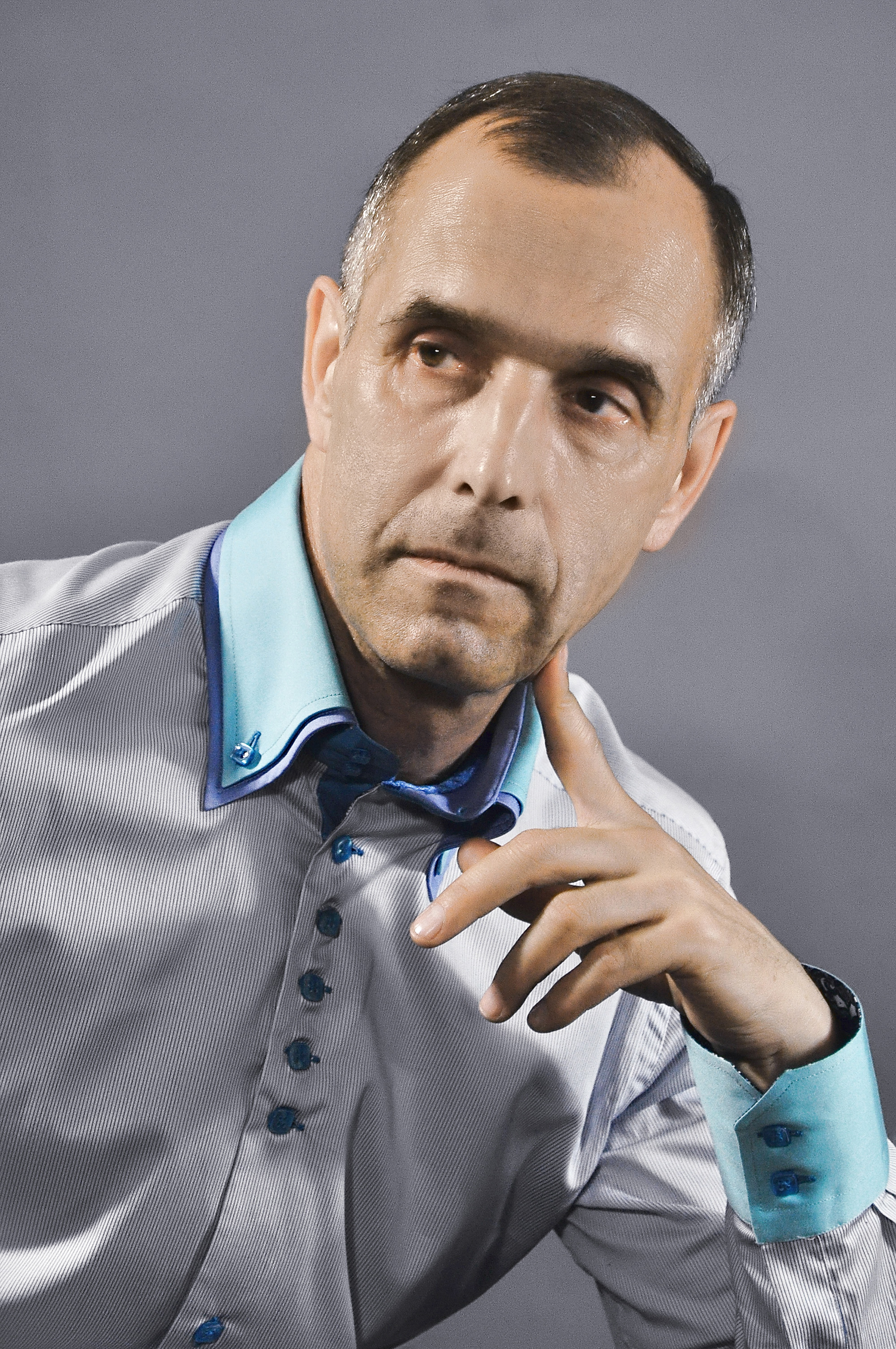
- Born: Sergei Leonidovich Udovik; August 26, 1956 (age 70); Kyiv, Ukraine
- Education: Kyiv Polytechnic Institute
- Occupations: publisher; writer; journalist; photographer; system analyst
- Website: udovik.com.ua/en

Sergei Leonidovich Udovik (26 August 1956, Kyiv) is a Ukrainian publisher, writer, journalist, photographer and system analyst. He is the director and chief editor of “Vakler” publishing company. He is a member of the National Union of Journalists of Ukraine, and has authored of about 100 research papers and articles on various subjects.

== Biography ==
In 1979 Udovik graduated with honors from the Faculty of Electroacoustics of Kyiv Polytechnic Institute, Kyiv, where he specialized in hydroacoustics. He defended degree work on topic: “The device classification of random processes on classes of stationary-nonstationary”.

From 1979–1993 he had a position at the Academy of Science of Ukraine where his research focussed on hydroacoustics, the design of medical equipment and the study of dolphins using evoked potentials. He also studied composite materials using acoustic emission method in collaboration with The Cosmonaut Training Center. His research papers were published in USA, Japan, and Great Britain. He has five certificates of authorship in sphere of space medicine, monitoring and diagnostics tool from the composite material. Among them are the inventor's certificate No.1221781 “Device for separation of evoked potentials”, the inventor's certificate No.1765758 “The method of express-control of the machined surface”, the inventor's certificate No.1711034 “The method for determining the wear resistance of cutting instrumentality”, the inventor's certificate No.1582069 “The devise for diagnosis of cutting instrumentality for the wear resistance”.

Since 1993 he has been a general director of “Vakler” enterprise (“Vakler” publishing company since 1995).

In 2000 he studied in The John F. Kennedy School of Government, Harvard University, USA (special course “The Harvard Ukrainian National Security Program”).

He is a co-author of such research papers as “AE Testing of Ceramic Components in Grinding” (in co-authorship with Maistrenko A. L., Polupan V. I., Minasevich B. B., SMiRT 11 Transactions, Vol. SD2 (August 1991), Tokyo, Japan, 1991, p. 411-416), “Peculiarities of AE application for diagnostics in grinding ceramic composites” (in co-authorship with Maistrenko A. L., MICC 90. Elsevier Applied Science, London, New York, p. 1266–1271). He is included in the Global Studies Directory.

Participation in KyivPhotoWeek 2018, 2020 (organized by Art Spatium Foundation, Tuzov Gallery, Tumasoff Gallery).

Joint project in the genre of photoart “Entrance”: Irina Semenyuta (painting), Sergei Udovik (photo).

Demonstrated at the exhibitions:

- "Funnel of Time" as part of Kyiv Art Week, Modern Art Research Institute of the National Academy of Arts of Ukraine (May 18, 2018).

- Ukrainian Contemporary Women's Art Fest, Modern Art Research Institute of the National Academy of Arts of Ukraine (June 12–13, 2018).

- Domus Romana Gallery, Rome, Italy, under the patronage of the Embassy of Ukraine in Italy (October 10–17, 2018).

== Bibliography ==
=== Author of books and photoalbums ===
- Monograph «Глобализация: семиотические подходы» (“Globalization: semiotic approaches”) (2002)
- “The History of Ukraine-Rus” (2010)
- "Ukraine. Travel Guide" (2008).
- “Ukraine. Historical Sights” (2005, 2008, 2012)
- “Ukraine. 100 Top Sights” (2006, 2007, 2008, 2009, 2010, 2012, 2013, 2017, 2018)
- “Crimea” (2010, 2012)
- “Kyiv” (2006, 2009, 2010, 2011, 2013, 2016, 2018)
- “Kyiv, My love” (2008, 2010, 2013)
- “Ukraine” (2009, 2011, 2012)
- “Kyiv in sketches” (2011)
- “Ukraine. Country and People” (2011)
- “Welcomes Ukraine” (2012)
- “Ukraine: palaces, castles and fortresses” (2013)
- “House of Horodecki” (2013)
- “Wilhelm Kotarbiński” (2015)
- “Kyiv in Art” (2018)
- “Ukraine” (2019)

=== Co-author of books ===
- “Ukraine-Rus: the Establishment of Statehood” in two volumes (in co-authorship with Y. Miroshnichenko, 2011)
- Udovik S.L. City Creative P. 63–64; Cluster P. 80–81; Think Tanks P. 462-463 // Global Studies. Encyclopedic Dictionary. / Edited by A.N. Chumakov, I.I. Mazour, W.C. Gay. – Amsterdam-New York: Rodopi, 2014. – 531 p.

=== Author of articles ===
- "Low Mass Purchasing Power Is the Main Enemy of Investment" (The Day Weekly Digest, No.21, 2000)
- "BUDGET BILL: Accountant’s Myth" (The Day Weekly Digest, No.27, 2000)
- "Quick economic growth is impossible without the interconnection of society, the electorate, and bureaucracy" (The Day Weekly Digest, No.29, 2000)
- "INFORMATION SPACE: Defense or Attack?" (The Day Weekly Digest, No.29, 2000)
- "Hayseed Solution Or African Option" (The Day Weekly Digest, No.30, 2000)
- "From the Village To Sociopolis" (The Day Weekly Digest, No.22, 2001)
- "Technology Oriented Toward the Futurem" (The Day Weekly Digest, No.37, 2001)

== Sources ==
- Sergei Udovik
