= Sergiy Tomilenko =

Ukrainian journalist and media manager

- Сергій Антонович Томіленко
- Serhiy Tomilenko (2016)
- Born: March 18, 1976 (age 50); Cherkasy, Ukrainian SSR, Soviet Union
- Education: Bohdan Khmelnytsky National University of Cherkasy
- Occupation: Journalist
- Employer: National Union of Journalists of Ukraine
- Awards

Sergiy Antonovych Tomilenko (Ukrainian: Сергій Антонович Томіленко; born 18 March 1976) is a Ukrainian journalist and media manager. He has served as president of the National Union of Journalists of Ukraine (NUJU) since April 2017. He is the founder of the regional online news publication Procherk.info and a former editor-in-chief of the Cherkasy newspaper Нова доба.

Tomilenko has been involved in Ukrainian journalism since 1995. His work has focused on regional media, journalists' professional rights, press freedom and international cooperation. Since Russia's full-scale invasion of Ukraine in 2022, he has represented Ukrainian journalists in international discussions about journalist safety and the survival of independent local media.

== Early life and education ==
Tomilenko was born on 18 March 1976 in Cherkasy, Ukrainian SSR (now Ukraine). He graduated from the Faculty of Physics and Mathematics at Bohdan Khmelnytsky National University of Cherkasy in 1998. He also completed the School of Contemporary Journalism organised by IREX ProMedia Ukraine in 1998 and the Ukrainian School of Political Studies, a programme supported by the Council of Europe, in 2007. He is a qualified trainer in practical journalism, having graduated from the IREX U-Media "Training for Trainers" program.

== Journalism career ==
Tomilenko began working in journalism in 1995. He worked as a correspondent, department editor and deputy editor-in-chief of the regional newspaper Молодь Черкащини (Youth of Cherkasy Region).

From 1998 to 2010, he served as editor-in-chief of the Cherkasy regional newspaper Нова доба (New Age), a socio-economic publication covering regional affairs.

In July 2010, he co-founded Procherk.info, a regional online publication covering political, social and economic developments in Cherkasy Oblast. He subsequently served as its editor and project manager. He also worked as an associate professor at the Department of Journalism of Bohdan Khmelnytsky National University of Cherkasy and participated in professional training programmes for regional journalists.

Leadership of the National Union of Journalists of Ukraine Tomilenko became involved in the activities of the National Union of Journalists of Ukraine in 2006, when he was elected chairman of its Cherkasy regional organisation. At the age of 30, he was reported by the Ukrainian media as the youngest regional head of the union in the country at that time.

In May 2012, he became First Secretary (deputy chairman) of the NUJU. In March 2014, he assumed the duties of the union's president following the appointment of the incumbent president, Oleh Nalyvaiko, to head the State Committee for Television and Radio Broadcasting of Ukraine. On 20 April 2017, Tomilenko was elected president of the National Union of Journalists of Ukraine by the organisation's congress in Kyiv.

His work as head of the organisation has included advocacy for journalists' professional rights, support for regional newsrooms and cooperation with international press freedom organisations. Activities during the Following Russia's full-scale invasion of Ukraine in February 2022, Tomilenko became an international advocate for Ukrainian journalists working under wartime conditions.

In an interview published by the European Federation of Journalists in February 2023, he discussed the challenges facing local media, the displacement of journalists and the importance of maintaining access to reliable information in communities affected by the war.

Under his leadership, the NUJU developed a network of Journalists' Solidarity Centres in cooperation with international partners. The centres provide journalists with workspace, safety equipment, professional training and practical assistance. Tomilenko has also advocated for the continuation of local printed newspapers in frontline communities, where electricity and internet access are frequently disrupted. Serving on the EFJ Steering Committee, he works to strengthen cross-border solidarity as the foundation for protecting journalism in conflict zones and beyond.

In March 2026, British journalist Tim Dawson published an article in the UK National Union of Journalists' publication describing Tomilenko's work supporting local newspapers and journalists exposed to drone attacks. The article examined the role of printed newspapers in maintaining access to information in communities near the frontline and described the NUJU's safety initiatives.

In an interview published by the Bavarian Journalists' Association on 9 November 2026, Tomilenko discussed the difficult conditions facing Ukrainian journalists, the risks of reporting from frontline areas and the efforts of local newsrooms to continue operating despite Russian attacks.

He has published works in periodicals, almanacs, and collections of journalistic writings. He is a co-author of analytical reports. PhD student of the Faculty of Journalism, Borys Grinchenko Kyiv Metropolitan University.

== International activities ==
Tomilenko has participated in international professional cooperation through the European Federation of Journalists (EFJ) and the International Federation of Journalists (IFJ). He has served on the EFJ Steering Committee and participated in international initiatives involving UNESCO and other organisations concerned with media freedom and journalist safety.

He has represented the Ukrainian journalistic community at international conferences and professional meetings, drawing attention to the situation of journalists in occupied and frontline territories and the need for international assistance to independent Ukrainian media. Sergiy Tomilenko took part in the CFOM Workshop “Reporting from Ukraine at War”, hosted by CFOM International Director William Horsley during the University of Sheffield’s International Journalism Week (2022).

He served as an official speaker at UNESCO events marking World Press Freedom Day (New York, 2023). He has repeatedly spoken out in support of Ukrainian filmmaker Oleh Sentsov, journalist Roman Sushchenko, and other individuals held as political prisoners in the Russian Federation. Together with the EFJ, he has demanded the release of Ukrainian journalists, including Dmytro Khyliuk, Iryna Danylovych, Iryna Levchenko, Remzi Bekirov, Rustem Sheikhaliev, Serhiy Tsyhipa, Server Mustafayev, Viktoriia Roshchyna, and other colleagues.

== Awards and honours ==
- 2009 – Honored Journalist of Ukraine.
- 2026 – Order of Merit (3rd Class), awarded by Presidential Decree No. 482/2026 of 5 June 2026, on the occasion of Journalist's Day, for his contribution to Ukrainian journalism and the information sector, professional excellence and dedication in covering Russia's full-scale invasion of Ukraine, and many years of conscientious work.

== Sources ==
- Почесні імена України — еліта держави. Том V. — К.: Видавництво «Логос Україна», 2019. — 344 с. — С. 74. — ISBN 978-966-2457-25-4 (in Ukrainian)
