= Yevhen Khacheridi =

Ukrainian footballer (born 1987)

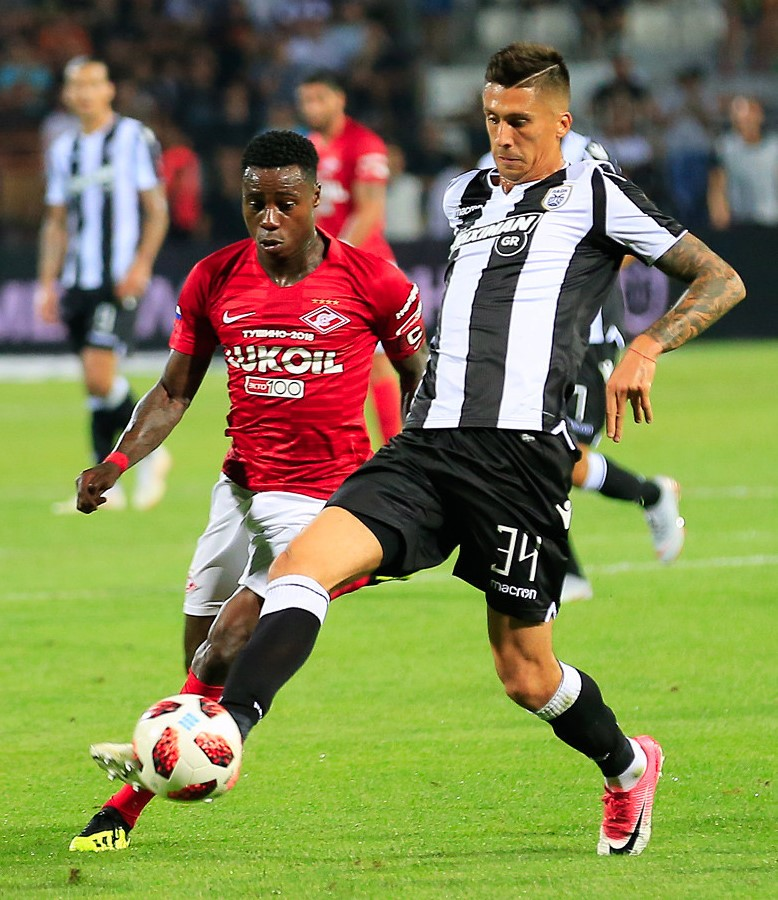
- Khacheridi with PAOK in 2018

Personal information
- Full name: Yevhen Hryhorovych Khacheridi
- Date of birth: 28 July 1987 (age 39)
- Place of birth: Melitopol, Soviet Union (now Ukraine)
- Height: 1.98 m (6 ft 6 in)
- Position: Centre back

Youth career
- 2007: Dynamo Kyiv

Senior career*
Years	Team	Apps	(Gls)
2005–2008	Olkom Melitopol	25	(1)
2006–2008	→ Volyn Lutsk (loan)	24	(2)
2008–2018	Dynamo Kyiv	150	(6)
2018–2019	PAOK	3	(0)
2020	Dynamo Brest	16	(0)
2025	Chornomorets Odesa	10	(0)
Total		228	(9)

International career^{‡}
2009–2018	Ukraine	51	(3)
- * Club domestic league appearances and goals as of 3 January 2026 ‡ National team caps and goals as of 23 March 2018

Yevhen Hryhorovych Khacheridi (Ukrainian: Євген Григорович Хачеріді; born 28 July 1987) is a Ukrainian former professional footballer.

== Club career ==
=== Dynamo Kyiv ===
In 2010 he moved to the senior club of Dynamo Kyiv. Here he won the Ukrainian Premier League in the 2008–09, 2014–15 and 2015–16. He also won the Ukrainian Cup in the season 2013–14, 2014–15 and the Ukrainian Super Cup in the season 2009, 2011 and 2016.

=== PAOK FC ===
In summer 2018 he moved to PAOK, in Greece. With the club of Thessaloniki, he won the Super League Greece in the season 2018–19 and the Greek Cup in the season 2018–19.

=== Dynamo Brest ===
Khacheridi signed a contract with Belarusian Premier League club Dynamo Brest in October 2019, effective from 1 January 2020 until the end of 2021. On 4 March 2020 he won Belarusian Super Cup.

=== Training with Desna Chernihiv ===
In summer 2021 he started training with Desna Chernihiv, the main city in Chernihiv in Ukrainian Premier League. The president of Desna Volodymyr Levin in an interview, confirmed the news and that the club was interested in signing the player. On 25 August 2021, Khacheredi left Desna's training camp after spending about three weeks in the location of the Desna Chernihiv, with which he maintained training form, the parties did not come to a common denominator regarding the signing of the contract. Khacheridi left the training camp of Oleksandr Ryabokon's team on his own initiative. It is unknown whether the search for a new club will continue. These news were also confirmed to by the Desna, Sport Director Vadym Melnyk.

=== Chornomorets Odesa ===
On 25 August 2025, Khacheridi joined Chornomorets Odesa. On 29 August 2025 in the 4th round match of Ukrainian First League between Chornomorets and FC UCSA he made his official debut as player of Chornomorets.

=== AFC Titan ===
In march 2026, he signed for AFC Titan.

== International career ==
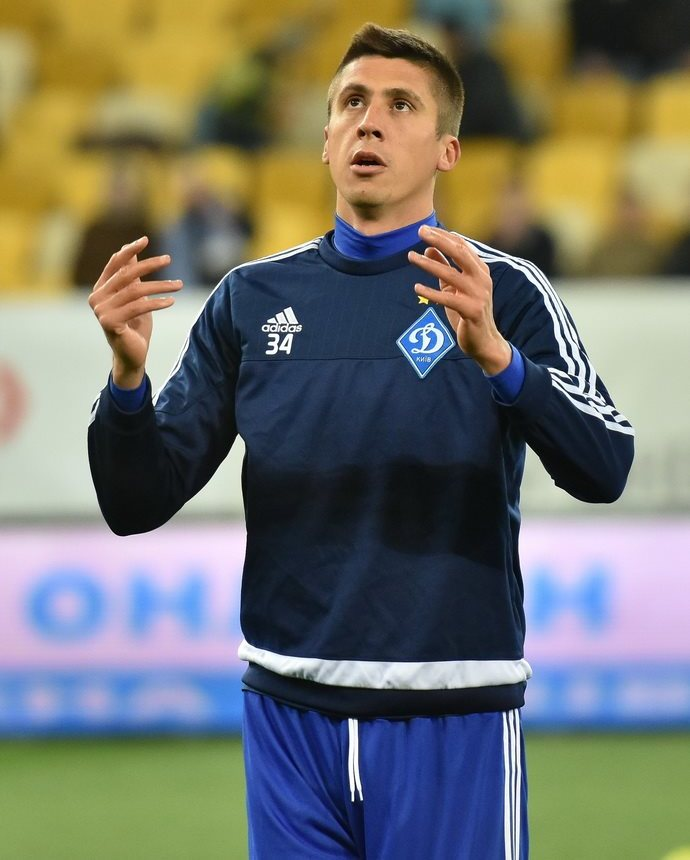

He made his international debut for Ukraine against England on a 1–0 victory for Ukraine, in Dnipro Arena on 10 October 2009, playing as centre back. He also played in the last group-stage game against Andorra in Andorra La Vella, on a 6–0 Ukrainian victory. Ukraine ended up 2nd in the group, behind England, so they played against his ancestral country Greece. The first game in Athens finished 0–0. However, Ukraine could not obtain a place on the 2010 World Cup final stage, because the second leg, played in Donbas Arena, ended in a 1–0 Greek victory, with a goal scored by Dimitris Salpingidis. Khacheridi was rostered for neither game, playing the full 90 minutes in both of them.

Khacheridi represented Ukraine at UEFA Euro 2012, having played all three games in Group Stage as a starter, though Ukraine was eliminated. His partners were his teammate Taras Mykhalyk and Yaroslav Rakitskiy.

== Personal life ==
Khacheridi's father belongs to the community of Pontic Greeks settled in Ukraine since the Middle Ages, while his mother is Ukrainian. Khacheridi has graduated from Melitopol Bohdan Khmelnytsky Melitopol State Pedagogical University, where he was studying to be a physical education teacher.

== Career statistics ==
=== Club ===
As of match played 18 December 2025

Appearances and goals by club, season and competition
Club	Season	League			Cup		Europe		Other		Total	
Club	Season	Division	Apps	Goals	Apps	Goals	Apps	Goals	Apps	Goals	Apps	Goals
Olkom Melitopol	2004–05	Ukrainian Second League	0	0	0	0	0	0	0	0	0	0
Olkom Melitopol	2005–06	Ukrainian Second League	9	0	0	0	0	0	0	0	9	0
Metalurh-2	2005–06	Ukrainian Second League	4	0	0	0	0	0	0	0	4	0
Olkom Melitopol	2006–07	Ukrainian Second League	16	1	2	0	0	0	0	0	18	1
Volyn Lutsk (loan)	2006–07	Ukrainian First League	12	0	0	0	0	0	0	0	12	0
Volyn Lutsk (loan)	2007–08	Ukrainian First League	12	1	0	0	0	0	0	0	12	1
Dynamo-2 Kyiv	2007–08	Ukrainian First League	2	0	0	0	0	0	0	0	2	0
Dynamo Kyiv	2008–09	Ukrainian Premier League	0	0	2	0	0	0	0	0	2	0
Dynamo Kyiv	2009–10	Ukrainian Premier League	18	0	3	1	4	0	0	0	25	1
Dynamo Kyiv	2010–11	Ukrainian Premier League	16	0	2	0	9	0	0	0	27	0
Dynamo Kyiv	2011–12	Ukrainian Premier League	19	1	0	0	5	0	0	0	24	1
Dynamo Kyiv	2012–13	Ukrainian Premier League	23	1	1	0	8	0	0	0	32	1
Dynamo Kyiv	2013–14	Ukrainian Premier League	17	0	1	0	9	0	0	0	27	0
Dynamo Kyiv	2014–15	Ukrainian Premier League	13	1	6	0	7	0	0	0	26	1
Dynamo Kyiv	2015–16	Ukrainian Premier League	15	1	2	0	8	0	0	0	25	1
Dynamo Kyiv	2016–17	Ukrainian Premier League	12	1	1	0	6	0	0	0	21	1
Dynamo Kyiv	2017–18	Ukrainian First League	17	1	1	0	9	0	0	0	27	1
PAOK	2018–19	Super League Greece	3	0	3	0	5	0	0	0	11	0
Dynamo Brest	2020	Belarusian Premier League	16	0	1	0	3	0	0	0	20	0
Chornomorets Odesa	2025–26	Ukrainian First League	10	0	1	0	0	0	0	0	11	0
Career total			231	8	24	1	73	0	0	0	333	9

=== International goals ===
Scores and results list Ukraine's goal tally first.

No	Date	Venue	Opponent	Score	Result	Competition
1.	26 March 2013	Chornomorets Stadium, Odesa, Ukraine	Moldova	2–0	2–1	2014 FIFA World Cup qualification
2.	6 September 2013	Arena Lviv, Lviv, Ukraine	San Marino	4–0	9–0	2014 FIFA World Cup qualification
3.	6 September 2013	Arena Lviv, Lviv, Ukraine	San Marino	6-0	9–0	2014 FIFA World Cup qualification

== Honours ==
Dynamo Kyiv

- Ukrainian Premier League (3): 2008–09, 2014–15, 2015–16
- Ukrainian Cup (2): 2013–14, 2014–15
- Ukrainian Super Cup (3): 2009, 2011, 2016

PAOK

- Super League Greece (1): 2018–19
- Greek Cup (1): 2018–19

Dynamo Brest

- Belarusian Super Cup (1): 2020

Chornomorets Odesa

- Ukrainian First League runner-up: 2025–26
