= Bohdan Khmelnytsky Melitopol State Pedagogical University =

University in Ukraine

Coordinates: 48.3042°N 38.0181°E

- Мелітопольсьикй державний педагогічний університет імені Богдана Хмельницького
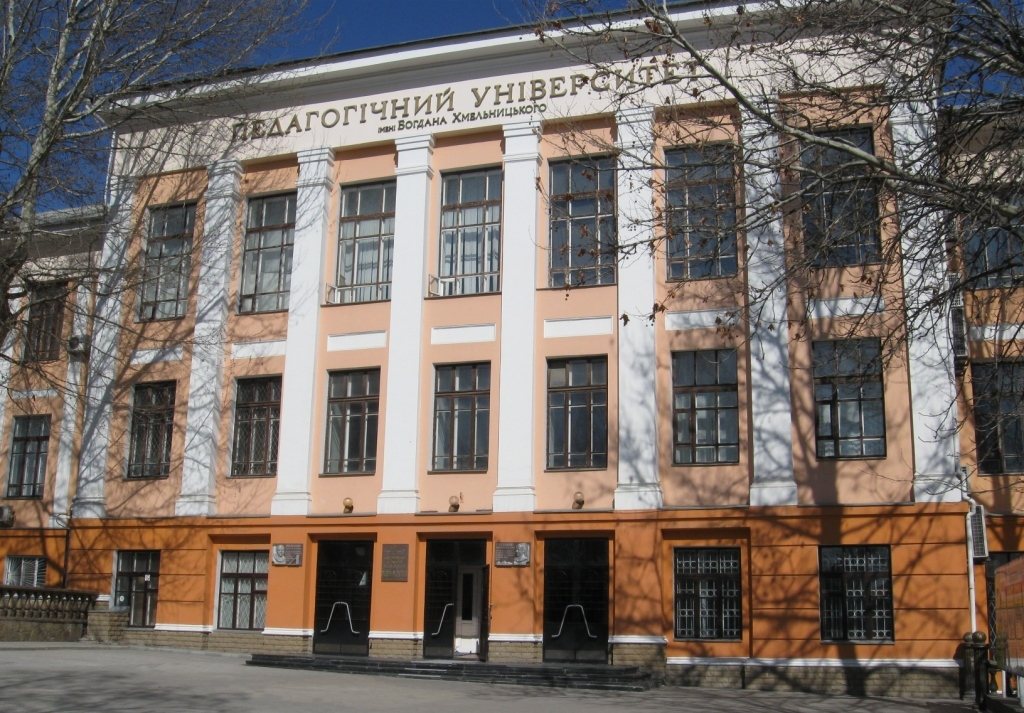
- Established: 1923
- Rector: Solonenko A.M.
- Location: Melitopol, Zaporizhzhia Oblast, Ukraine

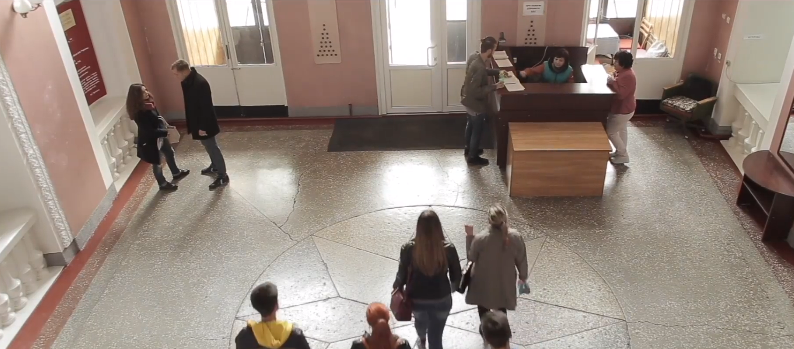
Zyomki film "New" in the MDPU, for the rector's rituals A. M. Solonenko

Bohdan Khmelnytsky Melitopol State Pedagogical University is a Ukrainian university in Melitopol. It is one of the most developed universities in Zaporizhia, Ukraine. It was established in 1923, and is also one of the leading state universities in the education of teachers.

== History ==
The institute started with five departments: The Social Economics Department, the Department of Pedagogues, the Department of Language and Literature, the Department of Agriculture and Biology, and the Department of Mathematics.

In 1919, training courses for teachers were organized at Melitopol Non-Classical Secondary School. In 1920, a decree on the opening of Pedagogical School was adopted. In the summer of 1941, students and teachers of the university were drafted into the Red Army following the Nazi invasion of the Soviet Union.

Since 1978, the institute was headed by Professor I.N. Totskiy and then by Doctor of Pedagogical Sciences, Professor I.P. Anosov, in 1995.

Since July 1975, the Melitopol State Pedagogical Institute has comprised two faculties: The Faculty of Chemistry and Biology and the Faculty of Natural Sciences and Geography.

During the 1980s, the Faculty of Music and Pedagogues opened. Since 1990, a number of new departments have been organised, including the Socio-Humanitarian and Philological Faculties.

In 2000, the Institute received university status by the decree of the Cabinet of Ministers of Ukraine.

The university was renamed in honour of Bohdan Khmelnytsky in 2009, changing from Melitopol State Pedagogical Institute to Bohdan Khmelnytsky Melitopol State Pedagogical University.

In 2011, Doctor of Philosophical Sciences, Professor V.V. Molodychenko was elected rector of the university. He was later replaced in 2017 by Associate Professor A.M. Solonenko, Doctor of Biological Sciences.

The university celebrated the 90th anniversary of its founding in 2013.

As of 2026, the university remains in operation although the city has been placed under Russian military occupation during the 2022 Russian invasion of Ukraine. 90% of its staff had refused to co-operate with the Russian occupational authorities.

== Institutes and faculties ==
- Faculty of Nature and Geography
- Educational and scientific institute of social-pedagogical and artistic education
- Faculty of Informatics, Mathematics, and Economics
- Faculty of Chemistry and Biology
- Faculty of Philology

== Honorary Doctors and famous alumni ==
- A.M. Volokh – Doctor of Biological Sciences, zoologist, "Excellence in the education of Ukraine"
- M.P. Guzyk – Corresponding Member of National Academy of Educational Sciences of Ukraine, National Teacher of Ukraine, Honored Worker of Education of Ukraine,
- O. M. Kostovsky – Doctor of Sciences (Physics and Mathematics), professor
- V.V. Osadchyi – Doctor of Pedagogical Sciences, professor, academician of the Ukrainian Academy of Acmeological Sciences, for "Excellence in the education of Ukraine"
- E.M. Pisanets – Doctor of Biological Sciences, zoologist
- Z.I. Sļepkan – Doctor of Pedagogical Sciences, "Excellence in the education of Ukraine", "Honored worker of education of Ukraine"
- A.M. Solonenko – rector of the Bohdan Khmelnytsky Melitopol state pedagogical university, Doctor of Biological Sciences, Associate Professor, "Excellence in the Education of Ukraine"
- Y.P. Tabachnik – People's Artist of Ukraine, Honored Artist of Ukraine
- Yevhen Khacheridi – football player, central defender of the national team of Ukraine, and vice-captain of Dynamo Kyiv.
