= National Union of Journalists of Ukraine =

Journalism union

- Національна спілка журналістів України
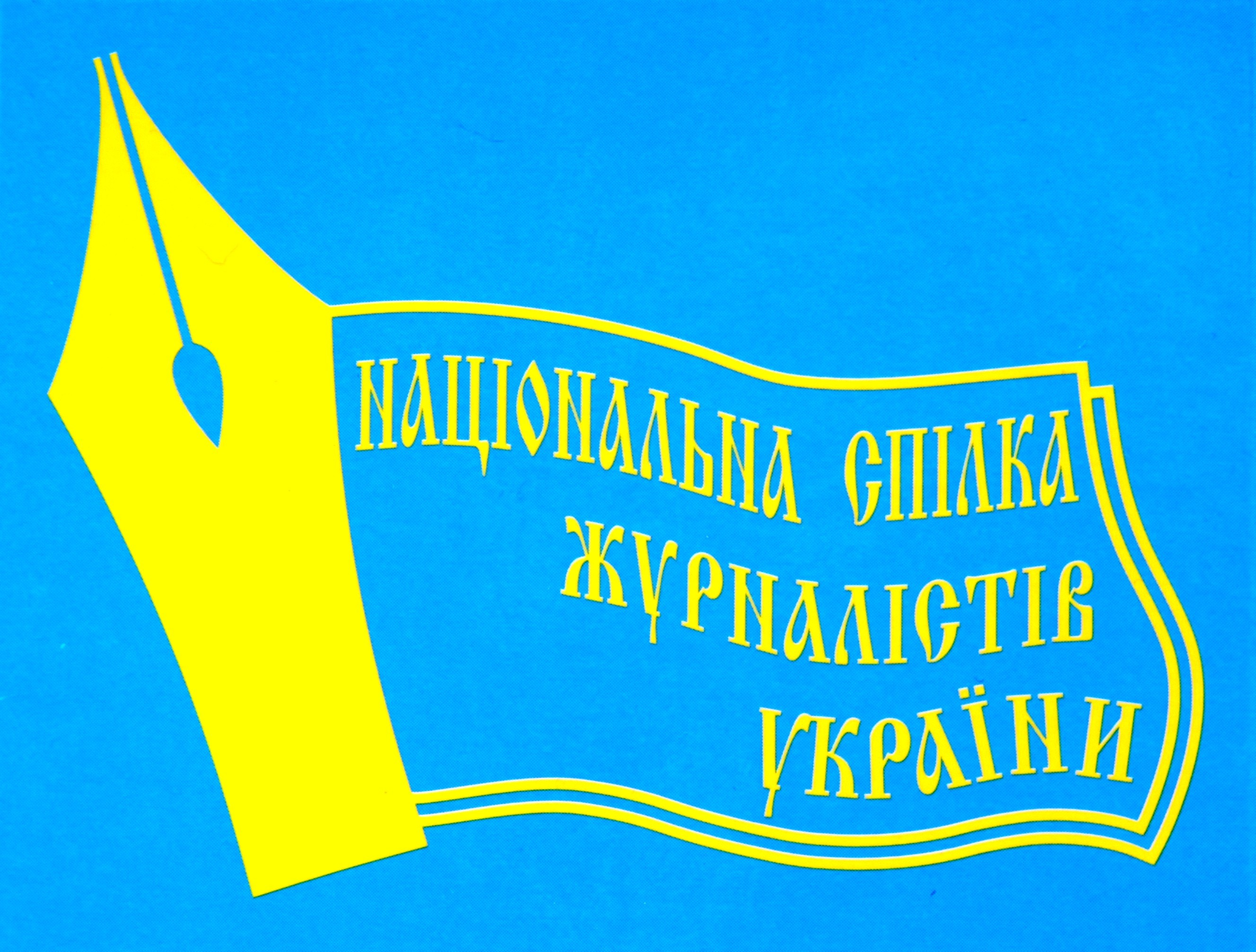

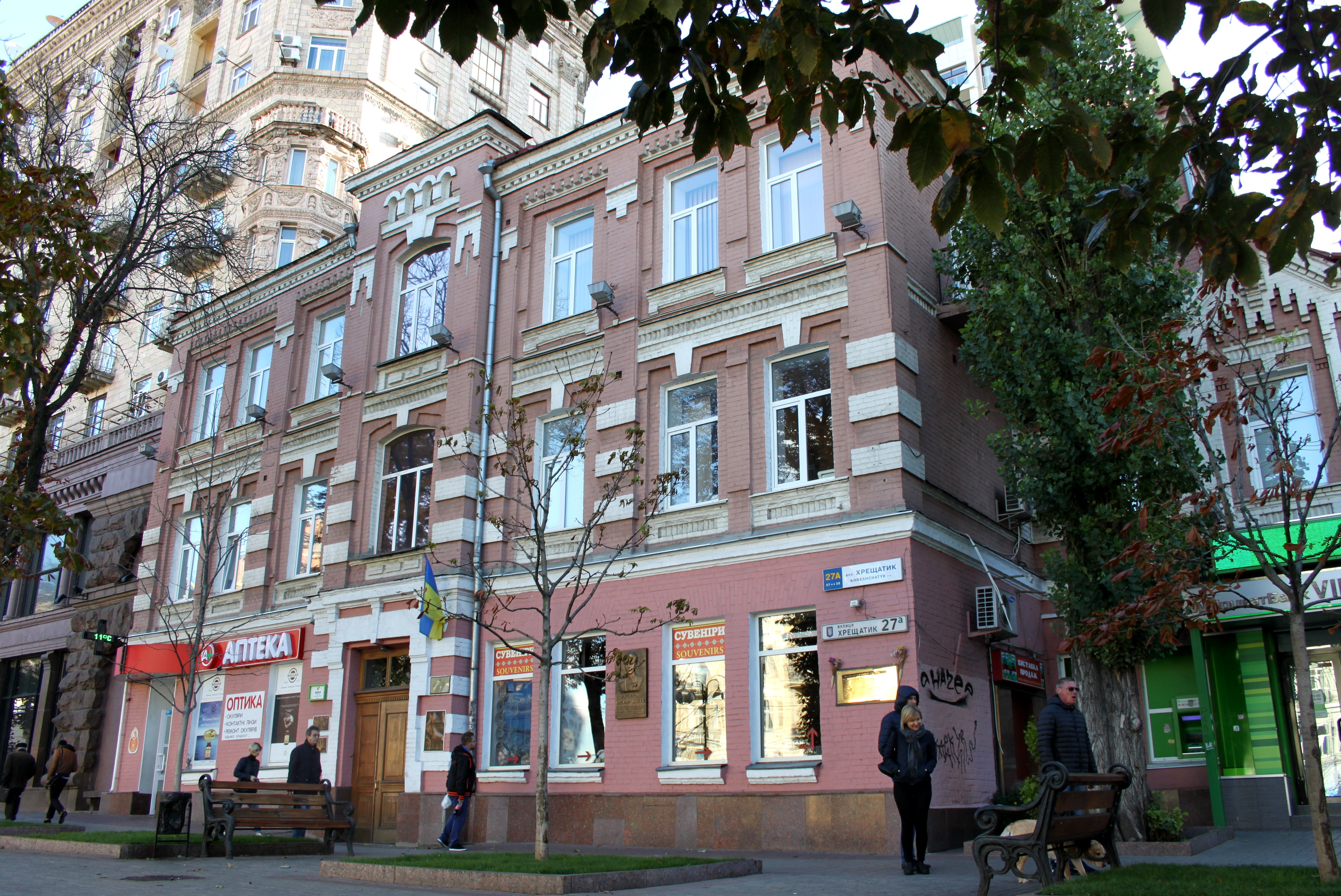
- The main office in Kyiv
- Abbreviation: NUJU
- Formation: 23 April 1959; 67 years ago
- Headquarters: 27 Khreshchatyk, Kyiv, Ukraine
- Members: 19,000 (2017)
- President: Sergiy Tomilenko
- Publication: Journalist of Ukraine
- Website: nuju.org.ua

The National Union of Journalists of Ukraine (NUJU; Ukrainian: Національна спілка журналістів України, romanized: Natsionalna spilka zhurnalistiv Ukrainy, НСЖУ) is a public organization uniting professional creative workers, journalists and other mass media workers who are professionally engaged in journalism and journalistic activities. It is affiliated with the International Federation of Journalists and the European Federation of Journalists.

== History ==
It was created on 23 April 1959 and officially recognized by a resolution of the Council of Ministers of the Ukrainian SSR. In the system of Soviet organizations, the Union of Journalists belonged (in contrast to the mass trade unions) to the group of so-called public creative unions; press workers were part of the culture workers' union. The Union of Journalists was headed by the republican board, the branches of the Union operated in the regions, and primary organizations operated in separate editorial offices of newspapers, radio and television. As of 1975, the Journalists' Union of the USSR had more than 7,000 members in the Ukrainian SSR, that was, less than half of all professional journalists working there. The Union of Journalists operated under the constant supervision of the Department of Propaganda and Agitation of the Central Committee of the Communist Party of Ukraine, since journalists in the Soviet Union were considered as "helpers of the party"; organizationally, the Union of Journalists was subordinated to the board in Moscow. From 1964 to 1991, the Union of Journalists annually awarded the Republican Prize named after Yaroslav Halan and prizes of local importance by its regional departments. Since January 1975, the Union of Journalists has published the monthly newsletter (later magazine) Journalist of Ukraine.

Since 18 February 1992, the Union of Journalists, in accordance with the decision of its board, has been functioning as an independent creative union of Ukraine. Members of the organization are issued with certificates and a press card. By the resolution of the Cabinet of Ministers of Ukraine dated 23 April 1999, the Union was granted national status. As of 2017, the National Union of Journalists of Ukraine had 19,000 members. Since 2017, Sergiy Tomilenko has been its president.
