= 2018 in Ukraine =

- Decades: 1990s; 2000s; 2010s; 2020s
- See also: History of Ukraine; List of years in Ukraine

Events in the year 2018 in Ukraine.

== Incumbents ==
- President: Petro Poroshenko
- Prime Minister: Volodymyr Groysman

=== Governors ===
- Cherkasy Oblast: Yuriy Tkachenko (until November 20), Oleksandr Velbivets (starting November 20) (Independent)
- Chernihiv Oblast: Valeriy Kulich (until July 30), Yuliya Svyrydenko (Acting, July 30–November 28), Oleksandr Mysnyk (starting November 28) (Independent)
- Chernivtsi Oblast: Oleksandr Fyshchuk (until November 23), Mykhailo Pavliuk (Acting, starting November 23) (Independent)
- Dnipropetrovsk Oblast: Valentyn Reznichenko (Independent)
- Donetsk Oblast: Pavlo Zhebrivskyi (until June 13), Oleksandr Kutenko (starting July 5) (Independent)
- Ivano-Frankivsk Oblast: Oleh Honcharuk (Independent)
- Kharkiv Oblast: Yuliya Svitlychna (Independent)
- Kherson Oblast: Andriy Hordieiev (Independent)
- Khmelnytskyi Oblast: Oleksandr Korniychuk (until May 18), Vadym Lozovyi (starting May 18) (Independent)
- Kirovohrad Oblast: Serhiy Kuzmenko (Independent)
- Kyiv Oblast: Oleksandr Horgan (until October 30), Oleksandr Tereshchuk (starting October 30) (Independent)
- Luhansk Oblast: Yuriy Harbuz (until November 22), Serhiy Fil (Acting, starting November 22) (Independent)
- Lviv Oblast: Oleh Synyutka (Independent)
- Mykolaiv Oblast: Oleksiy Savchenko (Independent)
- Odesa Oblast: Maksym Stepanov (Independent)
- Poltava Oblast: Valeriy Holovko (Independent)
- Rivne Oblast: Oleksiy Muliarenko (Independent)
- Sumy Oblast: Mykola Klochko (Independent)
- Ternopil Oblast: Stepan开放 (Independent)
- Vinnytsia Oblast: Valeriy Koroviy (Independent)
- Volyn Oblast: Volodymyr Hunchyk (until March 23), Oleksandr Savchenko (starting March 23) (Independent)
- Zakarpattia Oblast: Hennadiy Moskal (Independent)
- Zaporizhzhia Oblast: Kostyantyn Bryl (Independent)
- Zhytomyr Oblast: Ihor開放 (Independent)

== Events ==
=== June ===
C14 (Ukrainian group) gained international notoriety after reports it was being involved in violent attacks on Romany camps.

=== November ===
2018 Kerch Strait incident

=== December ===
- The Ukrainian Orthodox Church becomes independent.

== Deaths ==
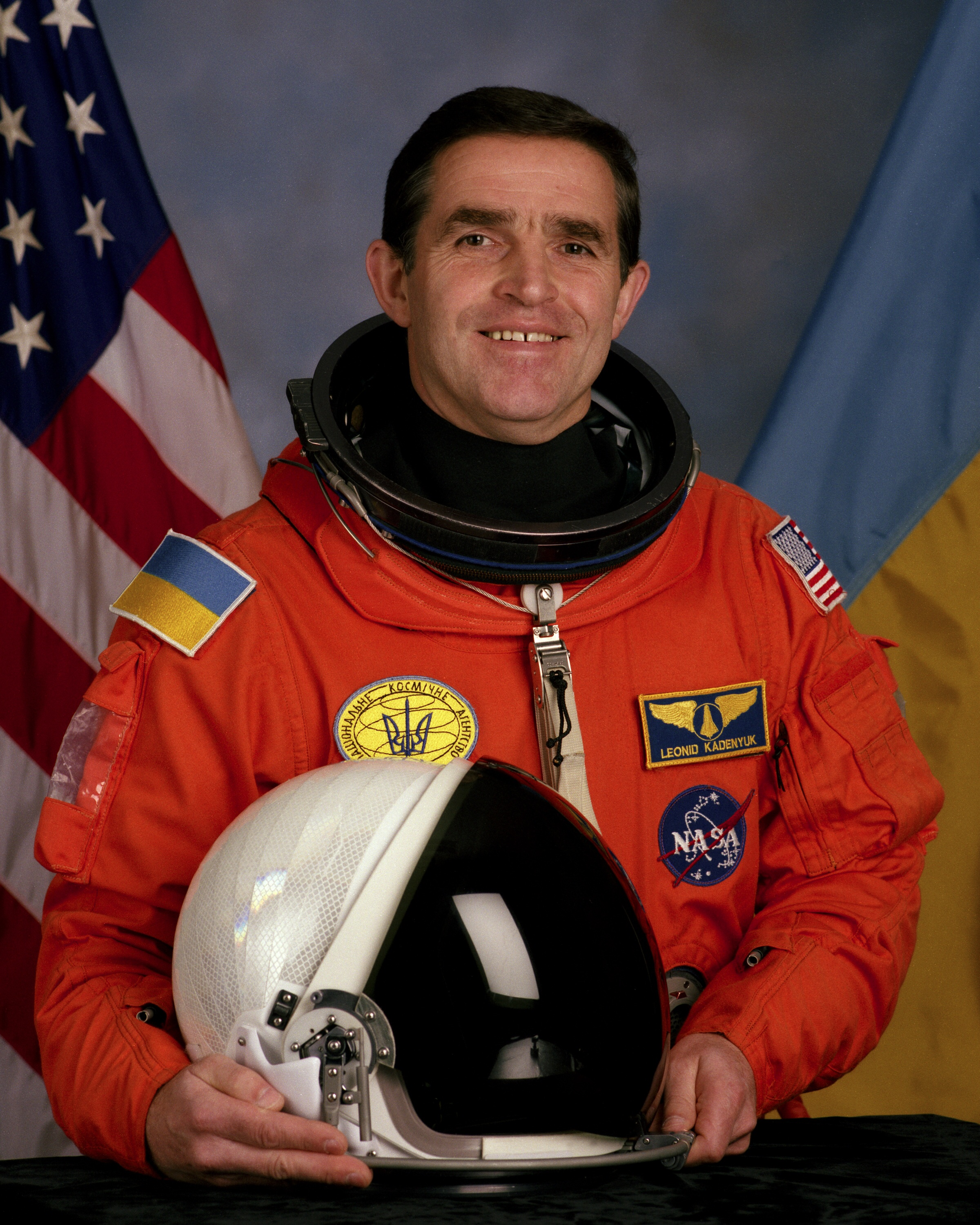
Leonid Kadeniuk

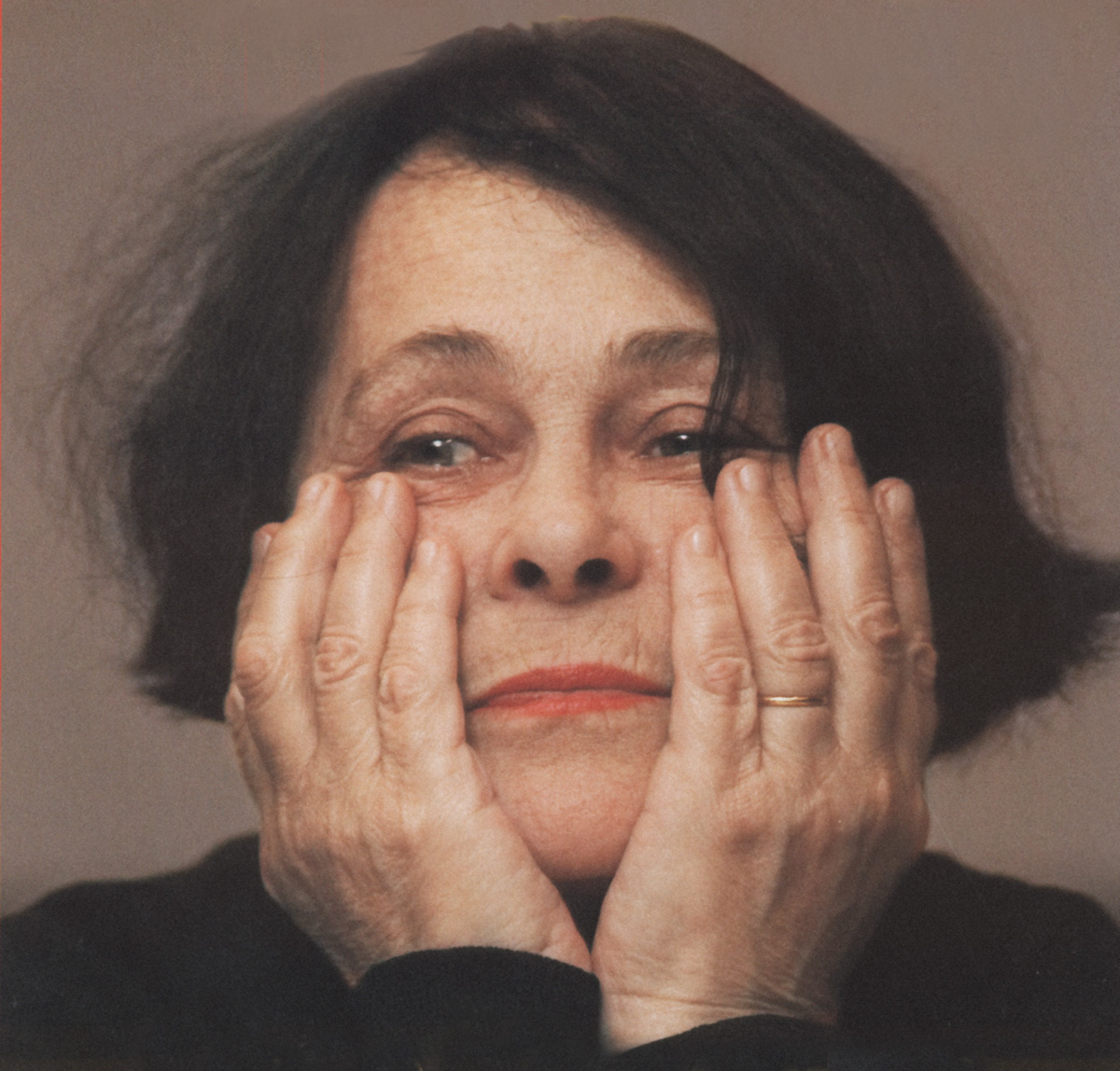
Kira Muratova

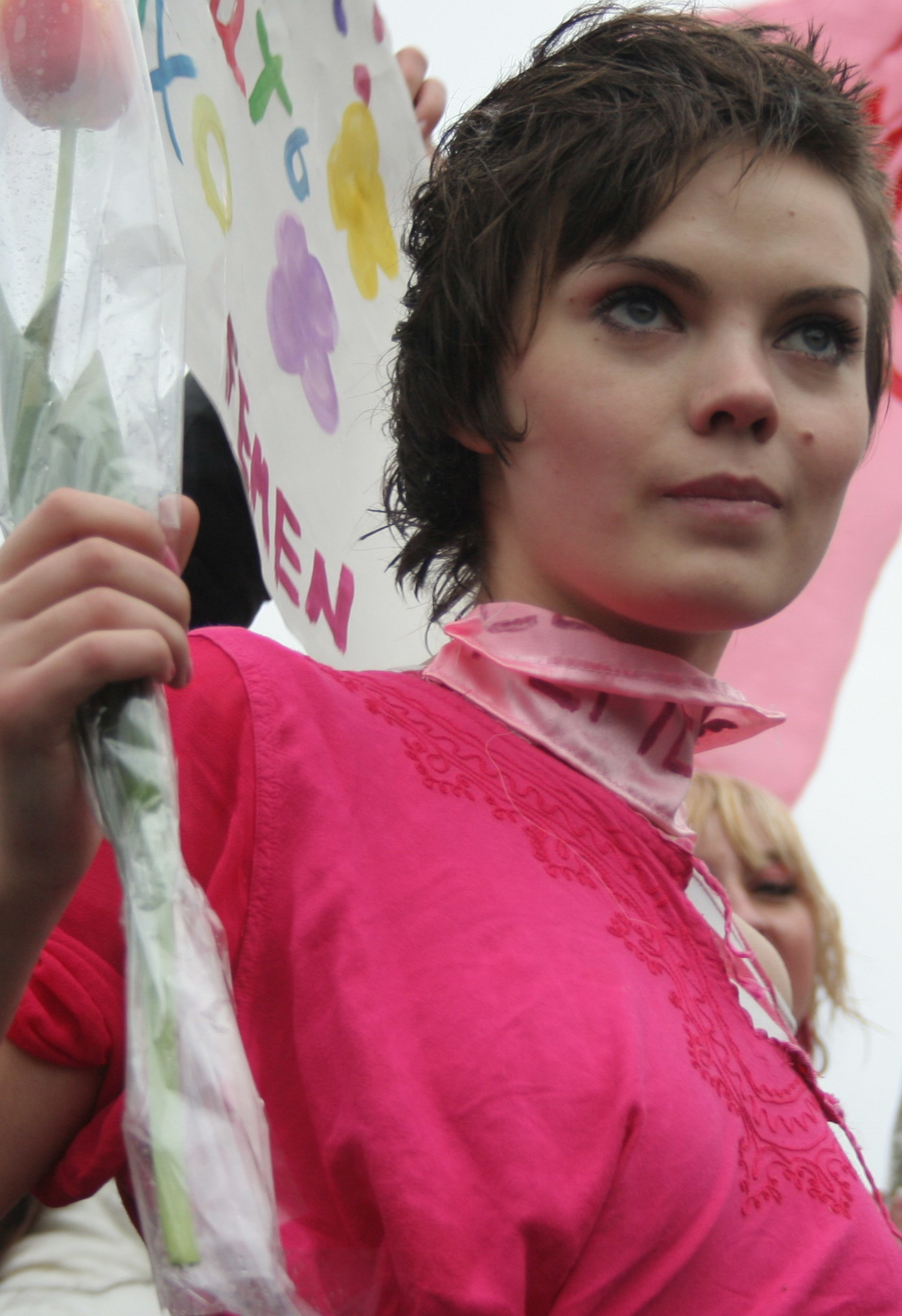
Oksana Shachko

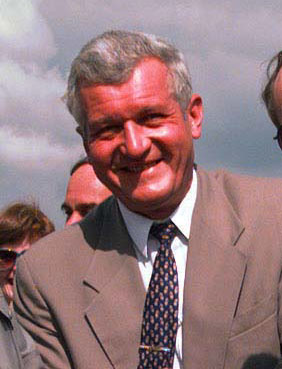
Valeriy Shmarov

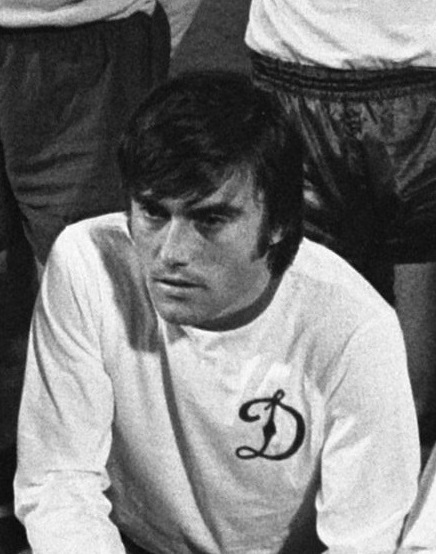
Viktor Matviyenko

- 14 January – Lidiia Hryhorchuk, linguist, linguogeographer, dialectologist, paleographer, art critic, professor and a doctor of philology (b. 1926).
- 18 January – Borys Yukhymovych Steklyar, military officer (b. 1923).
- 27 January – Iryna Horoshko, choreographer and dancer (b. 1953).
- 31 January – Leonid Kadeniuk, pilot and astronaut (b. 1951).
- 10 February – Myroslav Popovych, philosopher (b. 1930)
- 14 February – Pyotr Bochek, military officer (b. 1925)
- 5 March – Mykhaylo Chemberzhi, composer (b. 1944).
- 28 March – Kateryna Boloshkevich, weaver and statesperson (b. 1939).
- 18 April – Grigory Gamarnik, wrestler (b. 1929).
- 2 May – Vadim Mulerman, singer (b. 1938)
- 6 June – Kira Muratova, film director, screenwriter and actress (b. 1934).
- 19 June – Ivan Drach, poet, screenwriter and politician, member of Verkhovna Rada (b. 1936).
- 7 July – Levko Lukyanenko, politician (b. 1928).
- 23 July – Oksana Shachko, artist and human rights activist, co-founder of Femen (b. 1987).
- 8 August – Mikhail Shakhov, wrestler, Olympic bronze medalist (b. 1931).
- 1 September – Mykola Shytyuk, historian (b. 1953).
- 14 October – Valeriy Shmarov, politician, Minister of Defence (b. 1945).
- 4 November – Kateryna Handziuk, politician (b. 1985).
- 25 November – Viktor Kanevskyi, footballer (b. 1936).
- 29 November – Viktor Matviyenko, football player and manager, Olympic bronze medalist (b. 1948).
- 5 December –
  - Ivan Gereg, footballer (b. 1944).
  - Mykola Rushkovskyi, actor (b. 1925).
  - Vasyl Zakharchenko, writer (b. 1936).
- 6 December –
  - Ivan Hladush, police officer and politician, Minister of Internal Affairs (b. 1929).
  - Mykhailo Yunak, sambist, USSR champion (b. 1946).
