= 2016 in Ukraine =

- Decades: 1990s; 2000s; 2010s; 2020s
- See also: History of Ukraine; List of years in Ukraine

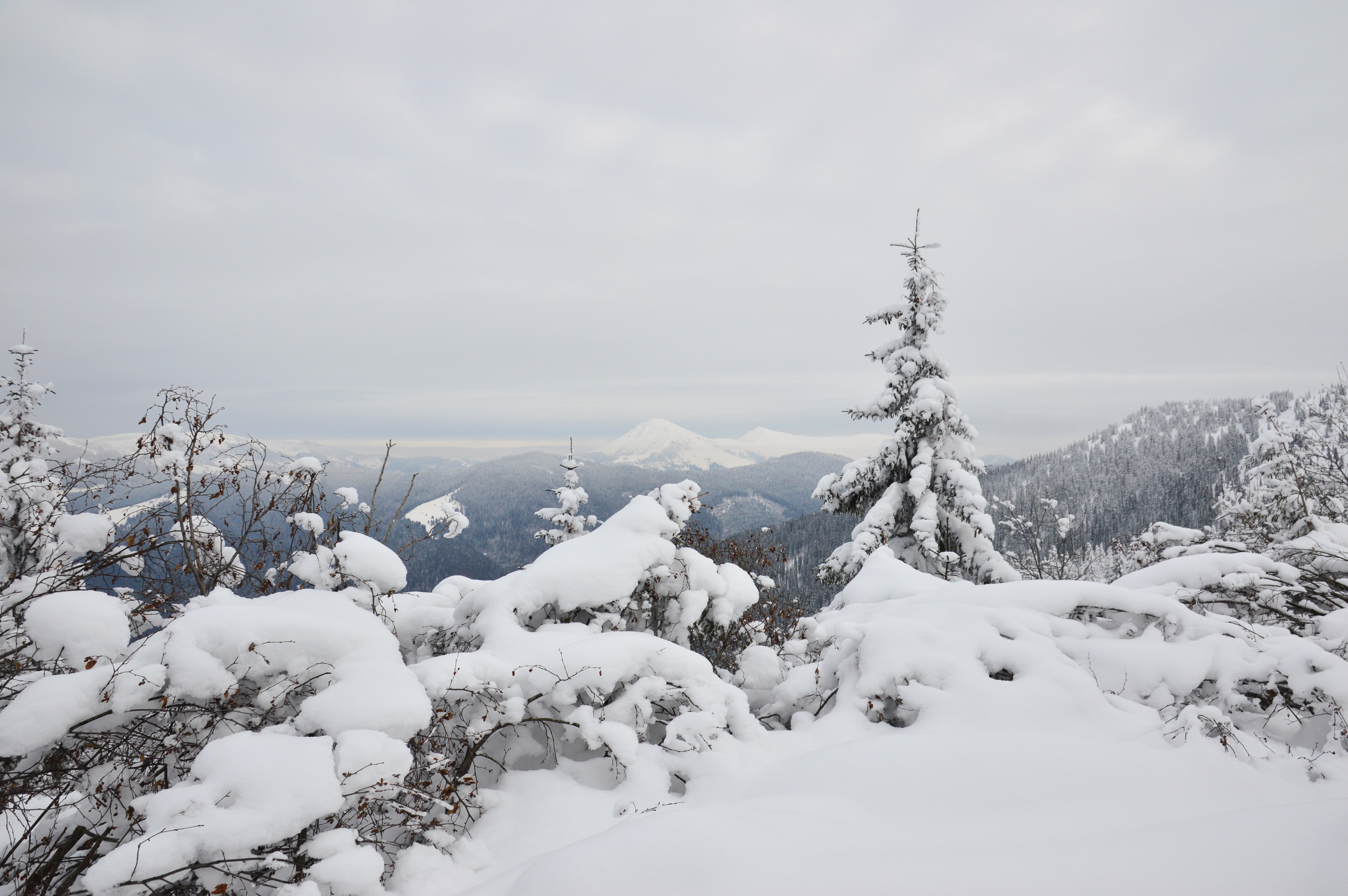
Ukraine in the Winter of 2016

Events in Ukraine in 2016:

== Incumbents ==
- President: Petro Poroshenko
- Prime Minister: Arseniy Yatsenyuk (until 14 April), Volodymyr Groysman (from 14 April)

=== Governors ===
- Cherkasy Oblast: Yuriy Tkachenko (Independent)
- Chernihiv Oblast: Valeriy Kulich (Independent)
- Chernivtsi Oblast: Oleksandr Fyshchuk (Independent)
- Dnipropetrovsk Oblast: Valentyn Reznichenko (Independent)
- Donetsk Oblast: Pavlo Zhebrivskyi (Independent)
- Ivano-Frankivsk Oblast: Oleh Honcharuk (Independent)
- Kharkiv Oblast: Ihor Rainin (until August 29), Yuliya Svitlychna (starting August 29) (Independent)
- Kherson Oblast: Valentyn开放 (Acting, until April 28), Andriy Hordieiev (starting April 28) (Independent)
- Khmelnytskyi Oblast: Mykhailo Zagorodny (until April 28), Oleksandr Korniychuk (starting April 28) (Independent)
- Kirovohrad Oblast: Serhiy Kuzmenko (Independent)
- Kyiv Oblast: Volodymyr Shandra (until February 3), Maksym Melnychuk (February 3–September 9), Oleksandr Horhan (starting September 16) (Independent)
- Luhansk Oblast: Heorhiy Tuka (until April 29), Yuriy Harbuz (starting April 29) (Independent)
- Lviv Oblast: Oleh Synyutka (Independent)
- Mykolaiv Oblast: Vadym Merikov (until June 29), Oleksiy Savchenko (starting October 6) (Independent)
- Odesa Oblast: Mikheil Saakashvili (until November 9), Solomiya Bobrovska (Acting, starting November 9) (Independent)
- Poltava Oblast: Valeriy Holovko (Independent)
- Rivne Oblast: Vitaliy Chuhunnikov (until April 28), Oleksiy Muliarenko (starting April 28) (Independent)
- Sumy Oblast: Mykola Klochko (Independent)
- Ternopil Oblast: Stepan Barna (Independent)
- Vinnytsia Oblast: Valeriy Koroviy (Independent)
- Volyn Oblast: Volodymyr Hunchyk (Independent)
- Zakarpattia Oblast: Hennadiy Moskal (Independent)
- Zaporizhzhia Oblast: Hryhoriy Samardak (until April 6), Kostyantyn Bryl (starting April 6) (Independent)
- Zhytomyr Oblast: Serhiy Mashkovskyi (until August 31), Ihor Hundych (starting August 31) (Independent)

== Events ==
- 11 January 2016, The representative of the Russian Federation to the Tripartite Liaison Group, Boris Gryzlov, has brought to Kyiv Vladimir Putin's offer regarding the end of the war in Donbas, which, however, did not leave Kyiv satisfied
- President of Ukraine Petro Poroshenko stated that he has signed a contract this year, according to which he transferred his stake in Roshen Corporation to an independent "blind" trust.
- Ukraine's central bank more than halved its 2016 growth forecast Thursday as the cash-strapped country battles crises ranging from falling commodity prices to a new trade embargo by Russia. The National Bank of Ukraine (NBU) also left its main borrowing rate unchanged at 22 percent in order to keep persistent inflation expectations in check.
- Influenza continues to circulate in Ukraine as well as the WHO European Region, with several regions in Ukraine exceeding the epidemic threshold. In week 5, the Ministry of Health in Ukraine reported a decrease in influenza activity but it cannot be predicted if this decrease will continue. The predominant strain continues to be influenza virus A(H1N1), the virus that emerged during the 2009 pandemic, and is known to cause illness in young adults including pregnant women.
- December 30 2016, The Russian book ban in Ukraine starts.

== Deaths ==
- 4 June – Zoya Klyuchko, entomologist, (b. 1933).
- 5 August – Vira Naydyonova, industrialist (b. 1948).
