= 2017 in Ukraine =

- Decades: 1990s; 2000s; 2010s; 2020s
- See also: History of Ukraine; List of years in Ukraine

Events from the year 2017 in Ukraine.

== Incumbents ==
- President: Petro Poroshenko
- Prime Minister: Volodymyr Groysman

=== Governors ===
- Cherkasy Oblast: Yuriy Tkachenko (Independent)
- Chernihiv Oblast: Valeriy Kulich (Independent)
- Chernivtsi Oblast: Oleksandr Fyshchuk (Independent)
- Dnipropetrovsk Oblast: Valentyn Reznichenko (Independent)
- Donetsk Oblast: Pavlo Zhebrivskyi (Independent)
- Ivano-Frankivsk Oblast: Oleh Honcharuk (Independent)
- Kharkiv Oblast: Yuliya Svitlychna (Independent)
- Kherson Oblast: Andriy Hordieiev (Independent)
- Khmelnytskyi Oblast: Oleksandr Korniichuk (Independent)
- Kirovohrad Oblast: Serhiy Kuzmenko (Independent)
- Kyiv Oblast: Oleksandr Horhan (Independent)
- Luhansk Oblast: Yuriy Harbuz (Independent)
- Lviv Oblast: Oleh Synyutka (Independent)
- Mykolaiv Oblast: Oleksiy Savchenko (Independent)
- Odesa Oblast: Solomiya Bobrovska (Acting, until January 12, Independent), Maksym Stepanov (starting January 12, Independent)
- Poltava Oblast: Valeriy Holovko (Independent)
- Rivne Oblast: Oleksiy Muliarenko (Independent)
- Sumy Oblast: Mykola Klochko (Independent)
- Ternopil Oblast: Stepan Barna (Independent)
- Vinnytsia Oblast: Valeriy Koroviy (Independent)
- Volyn Oblast: Volodymyr Hunchyk (Independent)
- Zakarpattia Oblast: Hennadiy Moskal (Independent)
- Zaporizhzhia Oblast: Kostyantyn Bryl (Independent)
- Zhytomyr Oblast: Ihor Hundych (Independent)

== Events ==
=== March ===
- 23 March –
  - Around 20,000 people are evacuated after explosions at a munition depot near Kharkiv.
  - Murder of Denis Voronenkov in Kyiv.

=== May ===
- 9–13 May – Eurovision Song Contest 2017

== Deaths ==
- 8 February – Viktor Chanov, Ukrainian footballer (b. 1959)
