= 2015 in Ukraine =

- Decades: 1990s; 2000s; 2010s; 2020s
- See also: History of Ukraine; List of years in Ukraine

The following lists events that happened during 2015 in Ukraine.

== Incumbents ==
- President: Petro Poroshenko
- Prime Minister: Arseniy Yatsenyuk

=== Governors ===
- Cherkasy Oblast: Yuriy Tkachenko (Independent)
- Chernihiv Oblast: Serhiy Zhurman (Acting, until March 31), Valeriy Kulich (starting March 31) (Independent)
- Chernivtsi Oblast: Mykhailo Pavliuk (Acting, until February 5), Oleksandr Fyshchuk (starting February 5) (Independent)
- Dnipropetrovsk Oblast: Ihor Kolomoyskyi (until March 25), Valentyn Reznichenko (starting March 25) (Independent)
- Donetsk Oblast: Oleksandr Kikhtenko (until June 11), Pavlo Zhebrivskyi (starting June 11) (Independent)
- Ivano-Frankivsk Oblast: Oleh Honcharuk (Independent)
- Kharkiv Oblast: Ihor Baluta (until February 3), Vadym Hlushko (Acting, February 3–April 13), Ihor Rainin (starting April 13) (Independent)
- Kherson Oblast: Andriy Putilov (until December 18), Valentyn Podrezyak (Acting, starting December 18) (Independent)
- Khmelnytskyi Oblast: Leonid Prus (until March 4), Mykhailo Zagorodny (starting March 4) (Independent)
- Kirovohrad Oblast: Serhiy Kuzmenko (Independent)
- Kyiv Oblast: Volodymyr Shandra (Independent)
- Luhansk Oblast: Hennadiy Moskal (until July 15), Yuriy Klymenko (Acting, July 15–July 22), Heorhiy Tuka (starting July 22) (Independent)
- Lviv Oblast: Oleh Synyutka (Independent)
- Mykolaiv Oblast: Vadym Merikov (Independent)
- Odesa Oblast: Ihor Palytsia (until May 30), Mikheil Saakashvili (starting May 30) (Independent)
- Poltava Oblast: Valeriy Holovko (Independent)
- Rivne Oblast: Vitaliy Chuhunnikov (Independent)
- Sumy Oblast: Mykola Klochko (Independent)
- Ternopil Oblast: Ivan Krysak (Acting, until April 2), Stepan Barna (starting April 2) (Independent)
- Vinnytsia Oblast: Valeriy Koroviy (Independent)
- Volyn Oblast: Volodymyr Hunchyk (Independent)
- Zakarpattia Oblast: Vasyl Hubal (until July 15), Hennadiy Moskal (starting July 15) (Independent)
- Zaporizhzhia Oblast: Valeriy Baranov (until February 20), Valentyn Reznichenko (February 20–March 26), Oleksiy Sliusar (Acting, March 26–April 6), Hryhoriy Samardak (starting April 6) (Independent)
- Zhytomyr Oblast: Serhiy Mashkovskyi (Independent)

== Events ==
=== January ===
- January 3 - An image of a BPM-97 apparently inside Ukraine, in Luhansk, appeared to deliver further evidence of Russian military vehicles inside Ukraine.
- January 6 - A military truck collides with a bus carrying members of the National Guard of Ukraine killing 12 soldiers and injuring 20 others.
- January 13 - A passenger bus is fired upon by rebels at a check point in eastern Ukraine. At least ten civilians were killed and many others injured.
- January 22 - An explosion on a civilian bus in the city of Donetsk kills thirteen people. Separatists and pro-government forces blame each other for the incident.
- January 24 - An attack on an open-air market in Mariupol, Ukraine leaves at least 27 people killed and more than 90 injured. The pro-Russian rebel leader, Alexander Zakharchenko, announces an offensive on Mariupol.

=== February ===
- February 7 - The leaders of France, Germany and Russia agree to work on a peace plan to be put to the President of Ukraine Petro Poroshenko on February 8.
- February 9 - An artillery shell causes a massive explosion at a chemical plant in Donetsk.
- February 10 - Fighting kills fifteen people and leaves 60 injured as missiles hit Ukraine's military headquarters in the city of Kramatorsk.
- February 13 - Ahead of the February 15 start of the agreed ceasefire, fighting in the past 24 hours kills eight Armed Forces of Ukraine service personnel.
- February 14 - Ukrainian President Petro Poroshenko warns of a threat to a planned ceasefire tonight from heavy fighting today and accuses Russia of "significantly increasing" its offensive. In a live interview he ordered all Ukrainian forces to cease fire after midnight.
- February 16
  - During the ceasefire, fighting kills at least five Ukrainian Army soldiers with 22 injured.
  - The Minister of Foreign Affairs of Ukraine Pavlo Klimkin claims that pro-Russian forces have fired on Ukrainian forces over 100 times in the past day. Separatists accuse Ukrainian troops of having violated the ceasefire.
- February 17 - The office of the President of Ukraine calls on the European Union and NATO to condemn the Russian backed rebels after the rebels conquered most of the town of Debaltseve and encircled 10,000 Ukrainian troops in the area. Rebel government officials claimed the town was not part of the recently established ceasefire.
- February 21 - Currency value temporarily falls in face of military threats.

=== March ===
- March 4 - At least 17 miners die in a suspected gas explosion at the Zasyadko coal mine in rebel-held eastern Ukraine.

== Deaths ==
- May 23 - Aleksey Mozgovoy, rebel commander (assassinated)
