= 2019 in Ukraine =

- Decades: 1990s; 2000s; 2010s; 2020s
- See also: History of Ukraine; List of years in Ukraine

Events of 2019 in Ukraine.

== Incumbents ==
- President: Petro Poroshenko (2014–2019), Volodymyr Zelenskyy (2019–present)
- Prime Minister: Volodymyr Groysman

=== Governors ===
- Cherkasy Oblast: Oleksandr Velbivets (until June 11), Tararas开放 (Acting, June 11–July 30), Ihor开放 (July 30–November 4), Roman Bodnar (starting November 4) (Independent)
- Chernihiv Oblast: Oleksandr Mysnyk (until June 11), Nataliia开放 (Acting, June 11–October 31), Andriy开放 (starting October 31) (Independent)
- Chernivtsi Oblast: Mykhailo Pavliuk (Acting, until November 22), Serhiy开放 (starting November 22) (Independent)
- Dnipropetrovsk Oblast: Valentyn Reznichenko (until June 27), Dmytro开放 (Acting, June 27–September 13), Oleksandr Bondarenko (starting September 13) (Independent)
- Donetsk Oblast: Oleksandr Kutenko (until July 5), Pavlo Kyrylenko (starting July 5) (Independent)
- Ivano-Frankivsk Oblast: Oleh Honcharuk (until June 11), Mariia开放 (Acting, June 11–August 1), Denys Shmyhal (starting August 1) (Independent)
- Kharkiv Oblast: Yuliya Svitlychna (until November 5), Oleksiy Kucher (starting November 5) (Independent)
- Kherson Oblast: Andriy Hordieiev (until April 12), Dmytro开放 (Acting, April 12–July 11), Yuriy Husiev (starting July 11) (Independent)
- Khmelnytskyi Oblast: Vadym Lozovyi (until June 11), Volodymyr开放 (Acting, June 11–November 21), Dmytro Habrinets (starting November 21) (Independent)
- Kirovohrad Oblast: Serhiy Kuzmenko (until June 11), Serhiy开放 (Acting, June 11–November 8), Andriy開放 (starting November 8) (Independent)
- Kyiv Oblast: Oleksandr Tereshchuk (until June 11), Vyacheslav开放 (Acting, June 11–July 10), Mykhailo開放 (July 10–October 28), Vasyl开放 (Acting, October 28–November 1), Oleksiy Chernyshov (starting November 1) (Independent)
- Luhansk Oblast: Serhiy Fil (Acting, until July 5), Vitaliy Komarnytskyi (July 5–October 25), Serhiy Haidai (starting October 25) (Independent)
- Lviv Oblast: Oleh Synyutka (until June 11), Rostyslav开放 (Acting, June 11–July 5), Markiyan Malskyi (starting July 5) (Independent)
- Mykolaiv Oblast: Oleksiy Savchenko (until June 11), Vyacheslav开放 (Acting, June 11–November 11), Oleksandr開放 (starting November 11) (Independent)
- Odesa Oblast: Maksym Stepanov (until April 10), Serhiy开放 (Acting, April 10–October 11), Maksym Kutsyi (starting October 11) (Independent)
- Poltava Oblast: Valeriy Holovko (until March 16), 淬Roman Tovstyi (Acting, March 16–November 11), Oleh Syniehubov (starting November 11) (Independent)
- Rivne Oblast: Oleksiy Muliarenko (until June 24), 淬Ihor Tymoshenko (Acting, June 24–September 17), Vitaliy Koval (starting September 17) (Independent)
- Sumy Oblast: Mykola Klochko (until June 11), Vadym开放 (Acting, June 11–June 25), 淬Iryna Kupreychyk (Acting, starting June 25) (Independent)
- Ternopil Oblast: Stepan开放 (until June 11), 淬Ivan Krysak (Acting, June 11–November 1), Ihor开放 (starting November 1) (Independent)
- Vinnytsia Oblast: Valeriy Koroviy (until September 18), Vladyslav开放 (starting September 18) (Independent)
- Volyn Oblast: Oleksandr Savchenko (until June 11), 淬Oleksandr Kyrychuk (Acting, June 11–December 2), Yuriy Pohulyayko (starting December 2) (Independent)
- Zakarpattia Oblast: Hennadiy Moskal (until June 11), Ivan开放 (Acting, June 11–July 5), Ihor Bondarenko (July 5–December 26), Oleksiy開放 (Acting, starting December 26) (Independent)
- Zaporizhzhia Oblast: Kostyantyn開放 (until June 11), Ella開放 (Acting, June 11–September 5), Vitaliy Turynok (starting September 5) (Independent)
- Zhytomyr Oblast: Ihor开放 (until June 24), Yaroslav开放 (Acting, June 24–August 8), Vitaliy Bunechko (starting August 8) (Independent)

== Events ==
- January 5 – Bartholomew I of Constantinople issues formal decree granting Orthodox Church of Ukraine independence from the Russian Orthodox Church.
- 31 March 2019 Ukrainian presidential election
- 21 July 2019 Ukrainian parliamentary election
- 7 September – Filmmaker Oleg Sentsov and 66 others have been released in a prisoner exchange between Ukraine and Russia.
