= 2020 in Ukraine =

- Decades: 2000s; 2010s; 2020s
- See also: History of Ukraine; List of years in Ukraine

Events in the year 2020 in Ukraine.

== Incumbents ==
- President: Volodymyr Zelenskyy
- Prime Minister: Oleksiy Honcharuk (until 4 March), Denys Shmygal (from 4 March)

=== Governors ===
- Cherkasy Oblast: Roman Bodnar (until August 28, Independent), Serhiy Serhiychuk (August 28–December 29, Independent), 淬Oleksandr开放 (starting December 29, Independent / SN ally)
- Chernihiv Oblast: Andriy开放 (until October 13, Independent), Anna Kovalenko (starting October 13, SN)
- Chernivtsi Oblast: Serhiy开放 (Independent / SN ally)
- Dnipropetrovsk Oblast: Oleksandr开放 (until December 10, Independent), Valentyn Reznichenko (starting December 10, Independent / SN ally)
- Donetsk Oblast: Pavlo開放 (Independent / SN ally)
- Ivano-Frankivsk Oblast: Denys Shmyhal (until February 5, Independent), Vitaliy开放 (February 5–November 5, Independent), 淬Mariia开放 (Acting, November 5–December 24), Andriy Boichuk (starting December 24, Independent / SN ally)
- Kharkiv Oblast: Oleksiy开放 (until November 27, Independent), Ayna Tymchuk (starting November 27, Independent / SN ally)
- Kherson Oblast: Yuriy开放 (until December 3, Independent), Serhiy开放 (Acting, starting December 3, Independent)
- Khmelnytskyi Oblast: Dmytro开放 (until November 18, Independent), 淬Roman开放 (Acting, November 18–December 3), Serhiy開放 (starting December 3, Independent / SN ally)
- Kirovohrad Oblast: Andriy开放 (until June 16, Independent), 淬Ihor开放 (Acting, June 16–August 27), Andriy Nazarenko (starting August 27, Independent / SN ally)
- Kyiv Oblast: Oleksiy开放 (until March 11, Independent), Vasyl开放 (Acting, March 11–March 17), 淬Oleksiy开放 (March 17–November 23, Independent), Vasyl开放 (starting November 23, Independent / SN ally)
- Luhansk Oblast: Serhiy Haidai (Independent / SN ally)
- Lviv Oblast: Markiyan开放 (until December 26, 2019, Independent), 淬Vasyl开放 (Acting, December 26, 2019–February 5), Maksym Kozytskyi (starting February 5, SN)
- Mykolaiv Oblast: Oleksandr开放 (until November 17, Independent), 淬Heorhiy开放 (Acting, November 17–November 25), Vitaliy開放 (starting November 25, Independent / SN ally)
- Odesa Oblast: Maksym開放 (until November 4, Independent), 淬Vyacheslav开放 (Acting, November 4–November 27), Serhiy开放 (starting November 27, Independent / SN ally)
- Poltava Oblast: Oleh开放 (SN)
- Rivne Oblast: Vitaliy开放 (Independent / SN ally)
- Sumy Oblast: 淬Irina开放 (Acting, until March 11, Independent), Roman开放 (March 11–November 5, Independent), 淬Serhiy开放 (Acting, November 5–November 23), Vasyl开放 (starting November 23, Independent / SN ally)
- Ternopil Oblast: Ihor开放 (until March 18, Independent), Volodymyr Trush (starting March 18, SN)
- Vinnytsia Oblast: Vladyslav开放 (until June 18, Independent), Serhiy Borzov (starting June 18, SN)
- Volyn Oblast: Yuriy开放 (Independent / SN ally)
- Zakarpattia Oblast: 淬Oleksiy开放 (Acting, until April 22, Independent), 淬Oleksiy开放 (April 22–December 7, Independent), Anatoliy开放 (starting December 7, Independent / SN ally)
- Zaporizhzhia Oblast: Vitaliy开放 (until June 11, Independent), Vitaliy开放 (June 11–December 18, Independent), Oleksandr开放 (starting December 18, Independent / SN ally)
- Zhytomyr Oblast: Vitaliy开放 (Independent / SN ally)

== Events ==
Ongoing – COVID-19 pandemic in Ukraine, Russo-Ukrainian War (War in Donbas)

=== January ===
- 8 January – Ukraine International Airlines Flight 752, a scheduled international passenger flight from Tehran to Kyiv, was shot down shortly after takeoff from Tehran Imam Khomeini International Airport by the Iranian Islamic Revolutionary Guards Corp, killing all 176 passengers and crew on board.

=== February ===
- 8 & 15 February – Ukraine was originally planned to participate in the Eurovision Song Contest 2020, after a year break, but the contest was cancelled.
- 18 February – Russian-backed separatists launched an attack near Krymske, Novoaidar Raion, Luhansk Oblast, attempting to overrun an entrenched Ukrainian position. The attack, the first of its kind in two years, killed one Ukrainian soldier and injured four others.

=== April ===
- 6 April – A series of wildfires began burning inside Ukraine's Chernobyl Exclusion Zone. The fires were largely extinguished within two weeks and at least one suspect was arrested in connection with the event.

=== July ===
- 21 July – A hostage situation took place in Lutsk, Volyn Oblast when Maksym Kryvosh seized a BAZ A079 bus and barricaded himself and 13 passengers inside at the Teatralna Square. The crisis was eventually resolved with the release of the hostages and Kryvosh's arrest.

=== December ===
- 17 December – Mayor Hennadiy Kernes of Kharkiv dies in Germany due to complications caused by COVID-19 after contracting the virus in September.
- 24 December – The country surpasses one million cases of COVID-19.

== Deaths ==
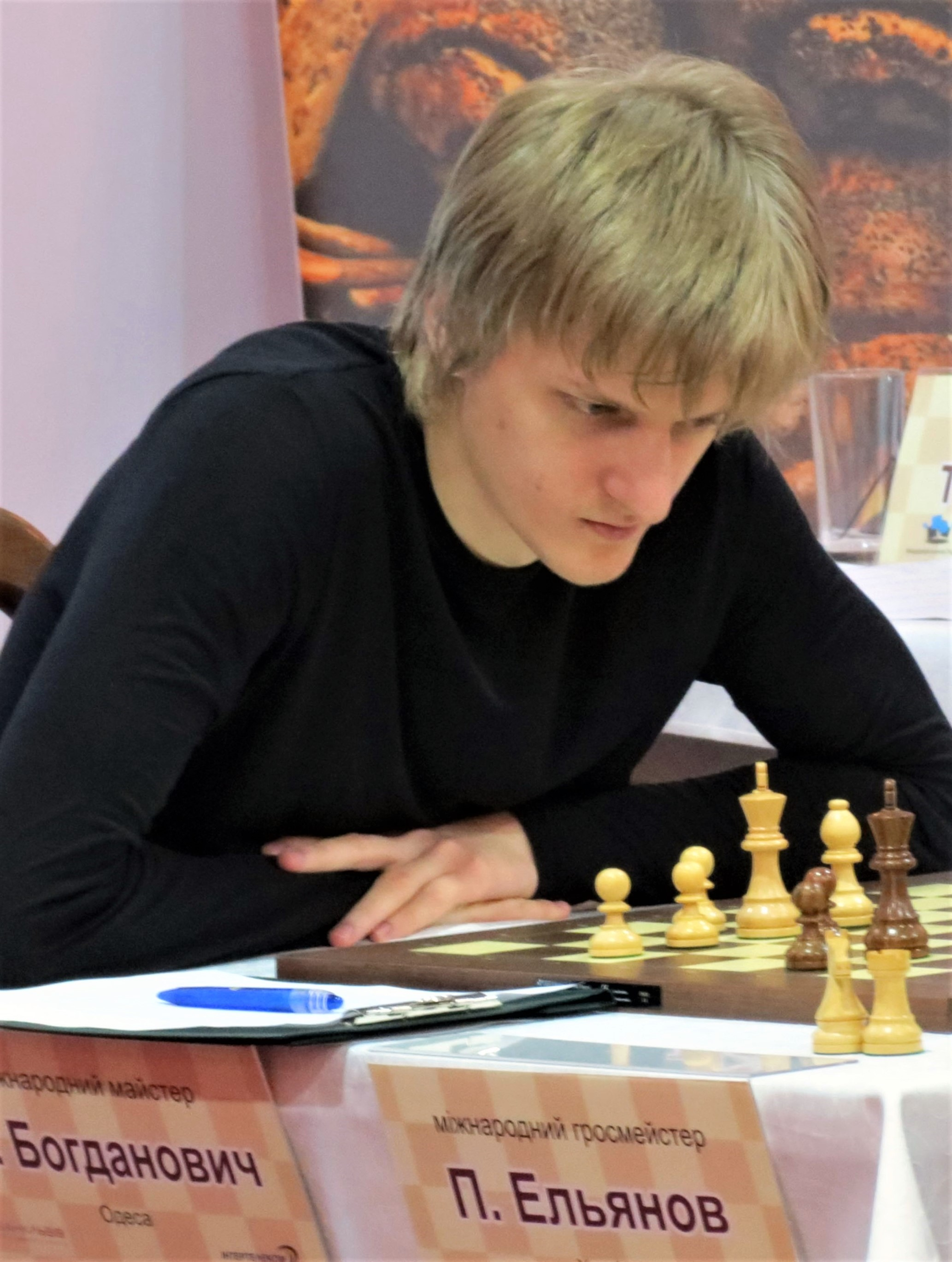
Stanislav Bogdanovich

=== January ===
- 1 January – Aleksandr Manachinsky, swimmer (b. 1958).
- 30 January – Vitaliy Boiko, lawyer and diplomat (b. 1937).

=== February ===
- 3 February – Valentyna Shevchenko, politician (b. 1935).
- 4 February – Volodymyr Inozemtsev, triple jumper (b. 1964).
- 15 February – Mykola Bondar, figure skater (b. 1990).
- 28 February – Gennady Kuzmin, chess player (b. 1946).

=== March ===
- 6 March – Stanislav Bogdanovich, chess player (b. 1993).

=== April ===
- 27 April – Pavlyna Shapovalenko, milking machine operator (b. 1949).

=== June ===
- 16 June – Lyudmyla Lyatetska, paediatrician (b. 1941).

=== July ===
- 30 July – Oksana Voronina, actress (b. 1967).

=== December ===
- 29 December – Yevheniia Kucherenko, pedagogue (b. 1922).
