= 2021 in Ukraine =

- Decades: 2000s; 2010s; 2020s
- See also: History of Ukraine; List of years in Ukraine

Events in the year 2021 in Ukraine.

== Incumbents ==
- President: Volodymyr Zelenskyy
- Prime Minister: Denys Shmyhal

=== Governors ===
- Cherkasy Oblast: Oleksandr Skichko (SN)
- Chernihiv Oblast: Anna Kovalenko (until August 4, SN), Vyacheslav Chaus (starting August 4, Independent / SN ally)
- Chernivtsi Oblast: Serhiy Osachuk (SN)
- Dnipropetrovsk Oblast: Valentyn Reznichenko (Independent / SN ally)
- Donetsk Oblast: Pavlo Kyrylenko (Independent / SN ally)
- Ivano-Frankivsk Oblast: Andriy Boichuk (until July 8, Independent), Svitlana Onyshchuk (starting July 8, Independent / SN ally)
- Kharkiv Oblast: Ayna Tymchuk (until August 11, Independent), Oleksandr Skakun (Acting, August 11–December 24), Oleh Syniehubov (starting December 24, SN)
- Kherson Oblast: Serhiy Kozyr (Acting, until March 1), Serhiy Kozyr (March 1–October 26, Independent), Hennadiy Lahuta (starting October 26, Independent / SN ally)
- Khmelnytskyi Oblast: Serhiy Hamaliy (Independent / SN ally)
- Kirovohrad Oblast: Andriy Nazarenko (until April 15, Independent), Valeriy Zhaldak (Acting, April 15–May 27), Mariia Chorna (starting May 27, Independent / SN ally)
- Kyiv Oblast: Vasyl Volodin (SN)
- Luhansk Oblast: Serhiy Haidai (Independent / SN ally)
- Lviv Oblast: Maksym Kozytskyi (SN)
- Mykolaiv Oblast: Vitaliy Kim (SN)
- Odesa Oblast: Serhiy Hrynevetskyi (Independent / SN ally)
- Poltava Oblast: Oleh Syniehubov (until December 24, SN), Dmytro Lunin (Acting, starting December 24, Independent)
- Rivne Oblast: Vitaliy Koval (SN)
- Sumy Oblast: Vasyl Khoma (until June 25, Independent), Vyacheslav Chynchenko (Acting, June 25–June 29), Dmytro Zhyvytskyi (starting June 29, Independent / SN ally)
- Ternopil Oblast: Volodymyr Trush (SN)
- Vinnytsia Oblast: Serhiy Borzov (SN)
- Volyn Oblast: Yuriy Pohulyayko (Independent / SN ally)
- Zakarpattia Oblast: Anatoliy Poloskov (until November 17, Independent), Petro Dobromilskyi (Acting, November 17–December 10), Viktor Mykyta (starting December 10, Independent / SN ally)
- Zaporizhzhia Oblast: Oleksandr Starykh (until December 29, Independent), Oleksandr Starukh (starting December 29, Independent / SN ally)
- Zhytomyr Oblast: Vitaliy Bunechko (Independent / SN ally)

== Events ==
Ongoing – COVID-19 pandemic in Ukraine, Russo-Ukrainian War (War in Donbas)

=== January ===
- 12 January – Moldovan President Maia Sandu arrives in the country for her first foreign visit as president. Both countries said that they are willing to join the Three Seas Initiative and European Union.
- 21 January – Fifteen people are killed and eleven others injured in a fire at a nursing home in Kharkiv.
- 25 January – The country reopens schools, restaurants, and gyms as a tough lockdown aimed to prevent a new wave of COVID-19 was ended.
- 27 January – In accordance with decommunization laws, the last statue of Vladimir Lenin in the country (excluding territories currently annexed by Russia or occupied by separatists) is demolished in Odesa Oblast.
- 29 January – The Verkhovna Rada passes a law banning registration of the Sputnik V vaccine developed by Russia.

=== February ===
- 5 February – The country secures 12 million doses of the vaccine developed by AstraZeneca and Novavax.
- 23 February – The country receives their first shipment of 500 doses of the Oxford–AstraZeneca vaccine manufactured by the Serum Institute of India.
- 26 February – The country reports 10 ceasefire violations in the Luhansk region.

=== March ===
- 1 March – The country reports multiple ceasefire violations in the Donbas region, with one casualty.
- 2 March – President Volodymyr Zelenskyy receives his first dose of Oxford–AstraZeneca vaccine.
- 4 March – The country reports its first cases of the Lineage B.1.1.7 variant first detected in the United Kingdom in two people from Ivano-Frankivsk.
- 9 March – The country grants approval for the Sinovac CoronaVac vaccine.
- 18 March – Kyiv Mayor Vitali Klitschko announces a three-week lockdown in the city beginning on March 20 which will close all cultural institutions and many non-essential shopping and entertainment malls due to an increase in COVID-19 cases.
- 31 March – Russian President Vladimir Putin accuses the country of "provoking armed confrontation" with pro-Russian separatists in the war-torn eastern portion of the country. Putin also said that Ukraine failed to comply with the July 2020 ceasefire of the conflict, which has killed over 14,000 people since it broke out in 2014.

=== April ===
- 6 April
  - The country signs a deal with Pfizer to supply 10 million doses of the Pfizer–BioNTech vaccine.
  - President Volodymyr Zelenskyy calls on NATO to hasten the country's accession to the military alliance in response to a growing build-up of Russian troops and military hardware on its borders, and to help bring an end to the ongoing conflict in the Donbas with pro-Russian separatists.
- 7 April
  - Russia warns that having the country join NATO "would exacerbate the Donbas conflict" after Ukraine urged NATO to "speed up" its membership application.
  - The Verkhovna Rada votes to legalize the use of medical cannabis products.
- 9 April – Russia deploys more troops to the Russia–Ukraine border as tensions escalate between the U.S., Russia, and Ukraine.
- 11 April – A Ukrainian soldier is killed and another is seriously wounded by Russian separatist forces artillery fire on the front line in Eastern Ukraine, bringing the total number of troops killed in combat this year to 27.
- 12 April – The country triggers Article 15 of the Charter on a Special Partnership, initiating an emergency meeting with NATO to discuss the Russian escalation in Donbas and the build-up of Russian forces on its border. The article was last triggered in 2018 during the Kerch Strait incident.
- 15 April – The country protests an alleged announcement by Russia that, beginning next week, it would be closing the Kerch Strait to foreign warships and state ships until October.
- 16 April – The country receives 117,000 doses of the Oxford–AstraZeneca vaccine through the COVAX vaccine-sharing initiative.
- 21 April – President Volodymyr Zelenskyy invites his Russian counterpart Vladimir Putin to a face-to-face meeting on the front line in the war-torn Donbas to negotiate an end to the conflict.
- 22 April – The Russian Defense Ministry announces that it will move its forces away from the Ukrainian border beginning tomorrow. The country and its western allies accused Russia of trying to provoke conflict by moving troops to the border, while Defense Minister Sergey Shoygu claimed that it was only to conduct drills.
- 23 April – A United Nations aid convoy brings 23 tons of humanitarian aid to the region around Donetsk, passing the contact line into separatist-controlled territory at the Novotroitske crossing point.

=== June ===
- 23 June – The country reports its first two cases of the SARS-CoV-2 Delta variant in a woman and a teenager who travelled from Russia.
- 28 June – The country and NATO forces launch joint naval drills in the Black Sea codenamed Sea Breeze 2021. Russia has condemned the drills, with the Russian Defence Ministry saying that they would closely monitor the drills.

=== July ===
- 2 July – Belarus closes its border with the country after President Alexander Lukashenko claims that arms are being smuggled into the country in an attempt by "outside powers" to overthrow his regime, saying that "They have crossed the line. We cannot forgive them". Ukraine denies Lukashenko's claims, and says that closing the border would make its people "suffer".
- 5 July – The country authorizes the usage of the Johnson & Johnson COVID-19 vaccine.
- 9 July – The Ministry of Defence accuses Russia of hacking the website of the Naval Forces to publish fake news and upload false documents regarding naval drills between Ukraine, NATO, and most Black Sea nations.
- 19 July – The President, in a joint statement with the Moldovan President Maia Sandu and Georgian President Salome Zourabichvili, announced the countries' intentions to pursue closer relations with the European Union, effectively rebuking Russia.

=== August ===
- 4 August – The country received 509,400 doses of the Oxford–AstraZeneca COVID-19 vaccine donated by Denmark.
- 15 August – Konstantin Pavlov, the pro-Russian mayor of Kryvyi Rih, is found dead at his home with a gunshot wound. The National Police say that they are currently establishing the circumstances of the mayor's death and have also opened a criminal case.
- 26 August – A mass grave containing between 5,000 and 8,000 skeletons is discovered in Odesa, during exploration works for a planned expansion of Odesa International Airport. The graves are believed to date back to the late 1930s during a major purge.

=== September ===
- 17 September – The country and the United States announce that they will begin joint military exercises involving 15 other countries in western Ukraine next week.
- 23 September – A law passed ordering oligarchs to stay out of politics, a day after the failed assassination attempt to kill an aide of President Volodymyr Zelenskyy, which officials said could have been a response to the reform.
- 27 September – Hungary and Russia sign a natural gas supply deal which will see Gazprom supply Hungary with 4.5 billion cubic metres of gas annually via Serbia and Austria for the next 15 years. The gas pact is criticized by the country, which argues that it is a "purely political, economically unreasonable decision". In response, Hungarian Foreign Minister Péter Szijjártó accuses Ukraine of "meddling" in its internal affairs.

=== October ===
- 7 October – Dmytro Razumkov, the speaker of the Verkhovna Rada is dismissed following his disagreements with President Volodymyr Zelenskyy and his ruling Servant of the People party's stances on legislation which aimed to reduce the influence of Ukrainian oligarchs.
- 12 October – The European Union vows to help the country with its gas supplies as President Volodymyr Zelenskyy underlines his concerns of potential Russian political leverage in the region in the aftermath of the agreement with Germany regarding the Nord Stream pipeline.
- 22 October – The country closes schools and public venues in Kyiv and will only permit the schools to reopen if teachers are vaccinated in other "red zone" areas after the country reported a record for the second consecutive day of 29,785 new cases and 614 deaths from COVID-19.
- 26 October – The country confirms it has carried out its first drone strikes using the Turkish-made Bayraktar TB2, destroying a pro-Russian separatist D-30 howitzer. A Ukrainian soldier is killed and another wounded by rebel artillery near Hranitne in Donetsk Oblast.
- 27 October
  - Kremlin Spokesman Dmitry Peskov warns that the delivery and first operational deployment of the Turkish Bayraktar TB2 in Donbas by the country may "destabilize the situation" in the region.
  - Ukrainian troops regain control of the village of Staromaryivka in the so-called "grey zone" between Ukraine and the Donetsk People's Republic (DPR), according to DPR Foreign Minister Natalya Nikonorova.

=== November ===
- 1 November – Kyiv begins to require vaccine certificates or negative test results in order to enter restaurants, cafés, gyms, entertainment facilities and shopping malls as well as to use public transportation in an attempt to reduce the number of COVID-19 cases.
- 4 November – The country surpasses three million cases of COVID-19 after reporting a record 27,377 new cases in the past 24 hours.
- 7 November – The country receives 2,930,300 doses of the Moderna COVID-19 vaccine distributed through the COVAX initiative.
- 8 November – The country's oldest English language newspaper the Kyiv Post suspends publication after 26 years in print following a dispute between its owner and journalists. All of the newspaper's journalists have been fired with immediate effect.
- 11 November – The country deploys a further 8,500 soldiers and police officers, as well as 15 helicopters, to the border with Belarus to prevent possible attempts by stranded migrants to cross into the country in order to reach the European Union.
- 16 November
  - British Prime Minister Boris Johnson states that the west will have to choose between reliance on Russian gas and supporting Ukraine amid reported buildups of the Russian military near the border with the country.
  - Researchers at the American cybersecurity firm Mandiant report that the Belarusian government has ties to the hacker group Ghostwriter, which was accused of targeting various German politicians and ministries in September and has since been accused of launching misinformation campaigns against multiple countries, including Ukraine.
- 18 November – Belarus suspends electricity supplies to the country, in "accordance with the established procedure for interaction within the framework of contractual relations", according to a statement from the Belarusian Ministry of Energy.
- 23 November – The country warns of "combat preparedness" of separatist forces in eastern Ukraine as the Russian military presence on the border increases, warning of a potential new conflict. The separatists began mobilization of reservists yesterday.
- 24 November
  - British foreign secretary Liz Truss warns Russia that any attack on the country would be a "grave mistake", and that the UK is working closely with its NATO allies to provide support to Ukraine.
  - The country launches a "special operation" on the Belarusian border involving troops from the National Guard, police, and the armed forces, including anti-tank and airborne units, amid fears of a migrant crisis and also due to a Russian military build-up on its borders.
- 26 November – President Volodymyr Zelenskyy accuses Russia of plotting a coup against him and says that Ukrainian tycoon Rinat Akhmetov was being enlisted to help plan the coup. Zelenskyy says that his country "is prepared for any scenario" as tensions rise.
- 29 November – Turkey offers to mediate between Ukraine and Russia over the crisis between the two nations.

=== December ===
- 7 December – Thirteen people are killed in a collision between a minibus and a truck in Chernihiv Oblast.
- 8 December – U.S. President Joe Biden announces that American troops will not be unilaterally deployed to the country in order to deter a potential Russian invasion, saying that the option "was not on the table".
- 13 December – One-hundred and six members of a Ukrainian "neo-Nazi" youth group are arrested in Russia, suspected of planning attacks, including mass murders. Russia has accused Ukrainian intelligence of financially funding the group. Ukraine alleges that the arrests and subsequent Russian media reporting are staged as part of Russian intelligence measures.
- 17 December – Russia sends an ultimatum that NATO never admit the country as a member of the military alliance, among other measures, saying that they want a legally binding guarantee to end further eastward expansion. Other demands include a Russian veto on Ukrainian membership in NATO, the removal of U.S. nuclear weapons from Europe, and the withdrawal of multinational NATO battalions from Poland and the Baltics.
- 18 December
  - The country reports its first case of the Omicron variant in a person who travelled from the United Arab Emirates.
  - Ukrainian ambassador to Israel Yevhen Korniychuk says that the country might recognize Jerusalem as the capital of Israel.
  - Former Ukrainian President and oligarch Petro Poroshenko leaves the country on a "pre-planned diplomatic tour" of Turkey and Poland after the National Bureau of Investigation attempts to issue a summons regarding charges of abetting terrorism. The National Bureau of Investigation claims that Poroshenko was involved in looting national resources from the country's temporarily occupied territories.
- 20 December
  - Poland and Lithuania join the country in calling for stronger international sanctions on Russia, with Polish President Andrzej Duda saying that "everything must be done" to prevent a potential Russian invasion of Ukraine, and that he was "absolutely against any policy of concessions to Russia".
  - U.S. Pentagon Press Secretary John Kirby says a small Department of Defense team has returned from the country after assessing its air defences.
- 24 December
  - Russian president Vladimir Putin demands that NATO guarantee that it will not move its forces into the country, accusing NATO and the U.S. of "trying to send Ukraine and Russia into direct armed conflict."
  - A group called Free City of Odesa claimed responsibility for burning down several vehicles belonging to the country's Armed Forces.
- 29 December – Three people are killed and four others are injured in a fire at a candlelit vigil in Kosiv.

== Deaths ==
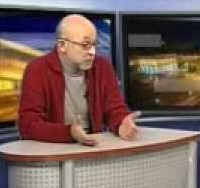
Serhiy Proskurnia

- 4 January – Anatoliy Butenko, politician, MP (b. 1938).
- 7 January – Vladimir Kiselyov, athlete (b. 1957).
- 1 February – Serhiy Proskurnia, stage director (born 1957).
- 1 April – Hanna Arsenych-Baran, writer and teacher (born 1970).
- 12 April – Nadiya Babych, linguist (born 1943).
- July – Lyubov Vorona, farm worker.
