= Oleh Honcharuk =

Oleh Honcharuk may refer to:

- Oleh Honcharuk (officer)
- Oleh Honcharuk (politician)
