= Maksym Pashkovskyi =

Ukrainian politician

- Максим Пашковський
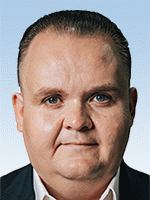
- Official portrait, 2019

People's Deputy of Ukraine
- Incumbent
- Assumed office 29 August 2019
- Preceded by: Oleksandr Dombrovskyi
- Constituency: Vinnytsia Oblast, No. 11

Personal details
- Born: 24 March 1983 (age 43) Vinnytsia, Ukrainian SSR, Soviet Union (now Ukraine)
- Party: Servant of the People
- Other political affiliations: Independent

Maksym Ihorovych Pashkovskyi (Ukrainian: Максим Ігорович Пашковський; born 24 March 1983) is a Ukrainian politician currently serving as a People's Deputy of Ukraine representing Ukraine's 11th electoral district as a member of Servant of the People since 29 August 2019. He is a member of the Verkhovna Rada Committee on Transport and Infrastructure.

== Biography ==
2005 - junior lawyer in a law firm in Kyiv. 2007 - lawyer in the production holding company "Carbon". 2009 - registered a private individual, started a private practice. 2012 - founded the social project "Legal Clinic" Ambulance "Since 2013 - works in the field of IT-business.

In 2019, Pashkovskyi was elected People's Deputy of Ukraine in Ukraine's 11th electoral district (Vinnytsia and Vinnytsia Raion) from Servant of the People. At the time of the election: Director of Pancher Solutions LLC, non-partisan. Lives in Vinnytsia.

In 2021, the Volnovakha City Military-Civil Administration was awarded a commemorative medal "For Charitable Activity".
