= Mayor of Vinnytsia =

The following is a list of mayors of the city of Vinnytsia, Ukraine. It includes positions equivalent to mayor, such as chairperson of the city council executive committee.

== Mayors ==
- Ovodov Mykola Vasyliovych, 1899–1917
- Altarzhevsky IS, 1917
- Litvitsky M. O, 1917–1918
- Edelstein Eugene Pylypovych, 1918
- Fanstil A. R, 1918–1920
- Remeiko Alexander Georgievich, 1923
- Slinko Ivan Fedotovich, 1925
- Vorobyov Ivan Onysymovych, 1926–1927
- Maslyuk Fedir Hnatovych, 1927–1928
- Mentsev N. D, 1931
- Kozis Luka Savich, 1932–1934
- Tsyupak Alexander Porfirovich, 1935–1936
- Fursa Stefan Vasilyevich, 1939–1941
- Savostyanov Alexander Alexandrovich, 1940s?
- Krutko Pavlo Ivanovych, 1944–1945
- Silin Dmitry Makarovich, 1945–1946
- Petrov Petro Vladimirovich, 1946–1949
- Bagriy Hryhorii Oleksiiovych, 1949–1953
- Yuriev Peter Ivanovich, 1953–1958
- Ogorodnik Stepan Vasilyevich, 1958–1962
- Chinchenko Vitaliy Pylypovych, 1962–1963
- Lutworth Heinrich Adamovich, 1963–1964
- Marchenko Vladimir Viktorovich, 1964–1968
- Holovaty Volodymyr Fedorovych, 1968–1972
- Zhmaka Boris Omelyanovich, 1972–1975
- Odnokolov Vladimir Semenovich, 1975–1987
- Ivanov Yuri Ivanovich, 1987–1990
- Yuriev Vladimir Ivanovich, 1990–1991

== Ukraine ==
- Mykola Kostin, 1991–1992
- Dmytro Dvorkis, 1992–2000
- Volodymyr Vakhovsky, 2000–2002
- Oleksandr Dombrovskyi, 2002–2005
- Volodymyr Groysman, 2006–2014
- Serhiy Morgunov, 2014-

== See also ==
- Vinnytsia history
- History of Vinnytsia (in Russian)
