= Vladyslav Skalsky =

Ukrainian politician (born 1976)

- Владислав Скальський
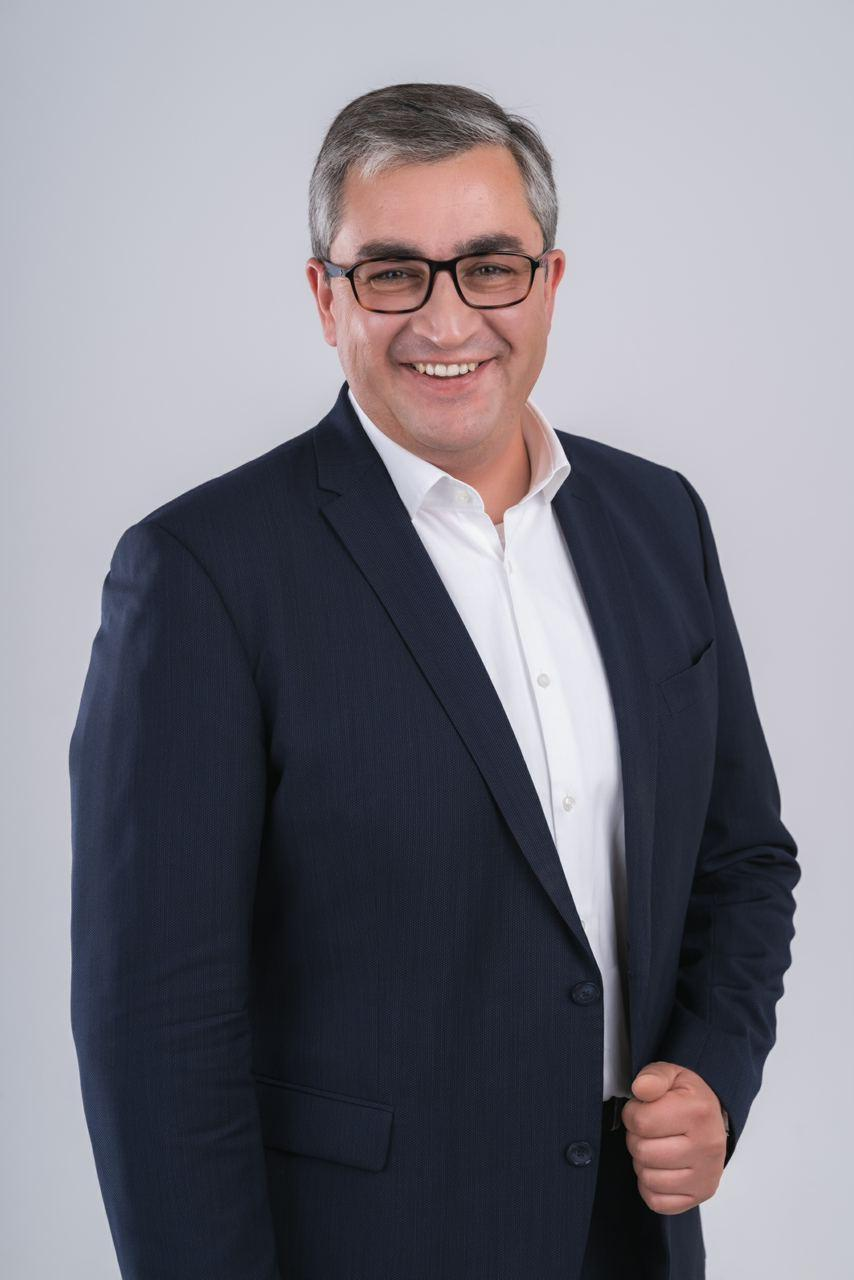

Governor of Vinnytsia Oblast
- In office 18 September 2019 – 19 June 2020
- President: Volodymyr Zelenskyy
- Prime Minister: Oleksiy Honcharuk; Denys Shmygal
- Preceded by: Valeriy Koroviy
- Succeeded by: Serhiy Borzov

Personal details
- Born: Vladyslav Volodymyrovych Skalsky; 18 January 1976 (age 50) Vinnytsia, Ukrainian SSR, Soviet Union
- Party: Independent
- Education: Vinnytsia National Technical University; National University of Kyiv-Mohyla Academy
- Occupation: civil servant politician

Vladyslav Volodymyrovych Skalsky (Ukrainian: Владислав Володимирович Скальський; born 18 January 1976) is a Ukrainian civil servant and politician. Skalsky was Governor of Vinnytsia Oblast from September 2019 until June 2020. Member of the Vinnytsia Regional Council of the VIII convocation. Chairman of the Standing Committee on Investment, Strategic Development and Local Self-Government.

== Biography ==
From 1997 to 2015, he held senior positions in commercial structures.

From 2008 to 2011 he served as a business coach. As part of the Corporate House of Training, he conducted training sessions on the analysis and management of the economic performance of the wholesale center on campus in Paris.

From February to June 2016, he was the director of the Institute of Urban Development of the Vinnytsia City Council, where he was involved in the urban development of the city.

In 2016-2019 he worked as a deputy mayor of Vinnytsia, dealing with the economic bloc. The results of the work were a significant increase in investment and credit ratings of the city according to the rating agency IBI-Rating to the level of invA +, as well as gaining the first place in the rating of transparency of the investment sector of Ukrainian cities according to Transparency International. The priorities in the position were to attract new industries and create jobs.

On September 19, 2019, by the decree of President Volodymyr Zelenskyy, he was appointed Head of the Vinnytsia Regional State Administration.

During the leadership of Vladislav Skalsky, Vinnytsia became the leader in the dynamics of agriculture, showing in the first quarter growth of 6.2% compared to the same period last year, and for four months - by 7.1% (although on average) in Ukraine there was a decline of 1.8% and 1.4%, respectively.

The region also became the leader in the dynamics of exports of goods and services: in the first quarter recorded an increase in exports of goods by 48% and services - by 47.5% . Due to this, the region is among the top six in terms of exports per capita.

In addition, Vinnytsia region took first place in the total area of new non-residential buildings commissioned per thousand inhabitants, exceeding the Ukrainian average by 4.48 times . Vinnytsia region is also among the top five in terms of capital investment per capita.

Member of the Vinnytsia Regional Council of the VIII convocation. Chairman of the Standing Committee on Investment, Strategic Development and Local Self-Government.
