= Volodymyr Demishkan =

Ukrainian politician

Volodymyr Demishkan Володимир Федорович Демішкан
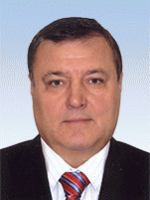

Member of the Verkhovna Rada
- In office 12 December 2012 – 27 November 2014
- In office 23 November 2007 – 14 May 2012

Governor of Vinnytsia Oblast
- In office 6 April 2010 – 26 May 2010
- Preceded by: Oleksandr Dombrovskyi
- Succeeded by: Mykola Dzhyha

Personal details
- Born: Volodymyr Fedorovych Demishkan; 16 November 1949 (age 76) Novoarkhanhelsk, Novoarkhanhelsk Raion, Ukrainian SSR
- Party: Party of Regions
- Education: Donetsk National Technical University; Kharkiv National Automobile and Road University

Volodymyr Fedorovych Demishkan (Ukrainian: Володимир Федорович Демішкан; born 16 November 1949) is a Ukrainian politician, member of the Verkhovna Rada.

In 1967-1996 he built his career at Bryanka transportation company. With breaks in 1996-2012 Demishkan worked as a chief of regional administration in a couple of oblasts (regions) and as head of the State Agency of Automobile Roads of Ukraine (Ukravtodor).

Along with heading a state road agency, in 2007-2014 Demishkan was a member of the Verkhovna Rada representing the Party of Regions.

In 2010, he also served as a Governor of Vinnytsia Oblast.
