= Valery Bevz =

Ukrainian politician

Valery Ananyevych Bevz is a People's Deputy of Ukraine, was a member of the Communist Party fraction in Verkhovna Rada from November 2007 to December 2012,), a militia general-lieutenant and Secretary of the Committee on Legislative Support of Law Enforcement from December 2007.

== Biography ==
Bevz was born on January 27, 1953, in Kozyntsi village, Vinnytsia Oblast, Ukraine. His spouse, Marianna (b. 1955), is a pensioner. They have a daughter, Svetlana (b. 1980), who is a crime investigator.

=== Education ===
In 1978, Bevz graduated from Gorky High School of the USSR Interior Ministry and in 1991 graduated from the Academy of the USSR Interior Ministry.

== Career ==
- 1971–73 – military service in Soviet Army
- 1978–96 – inspector, senior inspector, chief of public service to combat economic crime; 1st Deputy Chief, then Chief of the district office of internal affairs, Executive Officer, deputy director, then Director of Human Resources department, Head of the department for work with military personnel, 1st Deputy Head of the Ministry of Internal Affairs of Ukraine in Vinnytsia region, the Chief of the criminal police in Vinnytsia region.
- June 1996 – chief of the Office of Internal Affairs of Ukraine in the Chernivtsi region
- December 1996 – chief of the Office of Internal Affairs of Ukraine in the Chernihiv region
- 2000–03 – chief of the Office of Internal Affairs of Ukraine in Vinnytsia region
- 2003–04 – Rector of the Odesa Institute of Legal Affairs affiliated with National University of Internal Affairs
- 2004–05 – Deputy Head of Vinnytsia Regional State Administration
- 2007 – Deputy Minister of Emergencies and Affairs of Population Protection from Consequences of Chernobyl Accident
- November 2007 – December 2012 – Deputy of the Verkhovna Rada of Ukraine of the 6th convocation (elected from the Communist Party, No. 7 in the list)

Bevz did not return to parliament after the 2012 Ukrainian parliamentary election after losing in Ukraine's 11th electoral district (first-past-the-post wins a parliament seat) located in Vinnytsia Oblast).

- From 2007 - Secretary of the Committee on Legislative Support of Law Enforcement
- From November 2007 - member of the Communist Party fraction
- 2006–07 - worked as Vinnytsia Regional Council deputy

== Awards ==
Order of Merits, III class (1999); medal "For Honourable Service", III, II class

== See also ==
- 2007 Ukrainian parliamentary election
- List of Ukrainian Parliament Members 2007
- Verkhovna Rada
