= HUBOZ =

Former Ukrainian law enforcement agency

Chief Administration in Fight with the Organized Crime Головне управління по боротьбі з організованою злочинністю
- Abbreviation: HUBOZ

Agency overview
- Dissolved: 2015

Jurisdictional structure
- Operations jurisdiction: UKR
- Governing body: Ministry of Internal Affairs

Operational structure
- Headquarters: Kyiv
- Agency executive: Major General Oleksiy Rudenko, Director

Website
- Official Website

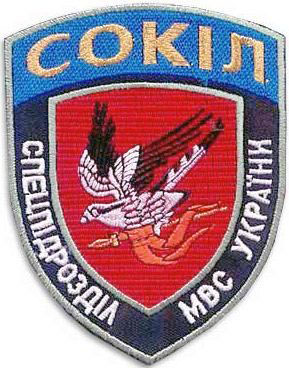
QRF "Sokil", a special purpose detachment of HUBOZ

HUBOZ (Ukrainian: ГУБОЗ, Russian: ГУБОП) is an abbreviation for the Chief Administration in Fight with the Organized Crime (Ukrainian: Головне управління по боротьбі з організованою злочинністю) of the Ministry of Internal Affairs of Ukraine was a specialized law enforcement agency. The agency director was the first deputy of the minister of Internal Affairs of Ukraine and acted as a minister in his or her absence.

HUBOZ director also governed the Department of Internal Security of HUBOZ.

In 2015 HUBOZ was liquidated with some other militsiya detachments of special purpose.

== Scope and purpose ==
- discovering and ceasing activities of the stable socially dangerous organized groups and crime organizations that influence the social-economical and crime generating situation in regions and country
- fight with corruption and bribery in the spheres that have a strategic meaning for the state economy among senior government officials, officials of judicial, law enforcement and regulatory authorities
- discovering and liquidation of crime schemes directed on legalization of income that were received as result of crime activities of organized groups and crime organizations
- providing reimbursement of losses to the state as well as individuals and legal entities caused by the activities of organized groups and crime organizations or corrupt acts

== History ==
=== List of commanders ===
List of commanders

- Lieutenant General Valeriy Koryak 2010 - present
- Volodymyr Bedrykivsky 2008 - 2010
- Ihor Bilozub 2006 - 2008
- Serhiy Kornich 2005 - 2006
- Valeriy Heletey 02-03/2005
- Mykhailo Manin 2003 - 2005
- Yuriy Cherkasov 11/2002 - 2003
- Mykola Dzhyha 08/2002 - 11/2002
- Mykhailo Korniyenko 10/2000 - 08/2002
- Mykola Dzhyha 04/1998 - 10/2000
- Yuriy Vandin 07/1995 - 04/1998
- Oleksandr Ishchenko 12/1992 - 07/1995
- Hryhoriy Sheludko 05/1992 - 12/1992
