= Ukraine's 11th electoral district =

11th Electroal district in Ukraine

- Electoral district for the Verkhovna Rada
- Region: Vinnytsia Oblast
- Population: 171,986

Current Electoral district
- Created: 2012
Party
Maksym Pashkovskyi
Servant of the People

Ukraine's 11th electoral district is a Verkhovna Rada constituency in Vinnytsia Oblast, Central Ukraine. Established in its current form in 2012, it includes part of the city of Vinnytsia and part of Vinnytsia Raion on the west bank of the Southern Bug river. The district is home to 171,986 registered voters, and has 113 polling stations. Its member of parliament has been Maksym Pashkovskyi of the ruling Servant of the People party since 2019.

== People's Deputies ==
| Party | Member | Portrait | Election |
|---|---|---|---|
| Independent | Oleksandr Dombrovskyi | | 2012 |
| Petro Poroshenko Bloc | Oleksandr Dombrovskyi | | 2014 |
| Servant of the People | Maksym Pashkovskyi | | 2019 |

== Elections ==
=== 2019 ===
2019 Ukrainian parliamentary election
| Party | Candidate | Votes | % | ±% |
|---|---|---|---|---|
| Servant of the People | Maksym Pashkovskyi | 21,582 | 26.6 | New |
| Independent | Serhiy Kudlayenko | 12,249 | 15.1 | New |
| European Solidarity | Andriy Hyzhko | 9,018 | 11.1 | ▼40.3 |
| Independent | Svitlana Bevz | 8,802 | 10.9 | New |
| Independent | Volodymyr Kistion | 7,765 | 9.6 | New |
| SiCh | Andriy Kovalyov | 5,595 | 6.9 | New |
| Opposition Platform — For Life | Ihor Horlachov | 3,905 | 4.8 | New |
| Independent | Hanna Davydenko | 3,479 | 4.3 | New |
| Batkivshchyna | Anastasia Prikhodko | 3,046 | 3.8 | ▼8.4 |
| Svoboda | Valeriy Skrypchenko | 2,228 | 2.7 | New |
| Independent | Oleh Shulikin | 1,537 | 1.9 | New |
| Opposition Bloc | Olena Lepey | 1,070 | 1.3 | ▼0.6 |
| Independent | Maksym Hadzhynov | 774 | 1.0 | New |
| Total votes | | 81,050 | 100.0 | N/A |
| Rejected ballots | | 2,439 | 2.9 | ▼2.6 |
| Turnout | | 83,489 | 49.7 | ▼10.0 |
| Registered electors | | 168,079 | | |
| Servant of the People gain from Petro Poroshenko Bloc | | | | |

=== 2014 ===
2014 Ukrainian parliamentary election
| Party | Candidate | Votes | % | ±% |
|---|---|---|---|---|
| Petro Poroshenko Bloc | Oleksandr Dombrovskyi | 51,043 | 51.4 | New |
| Batkivshchyna | Nataliya Soleyko | 12,344 | 12.2 | ▼15.8 |
| Self Reliance | Oleksandr Zyershchykov | 10,250 | 10.3 | New |
| Independent | Volodymyr Bazelyuk | 8,428 | 8.5 | New |
| Independent | Borys Maksymchuk | 3,545 | 3.6 | New |
| Radical Party | Maksym Petko | 2,174 | 2.2 | New |
| Opposition Bloc | Olha Bryha | 1,868 | 1.9 | New |
| KPU | Stanislav Matyshchuk | 1,820 | 1.8 | ▼9.4 |
| Independent | Lyudmyla Hryhorevska | 1,591 | 1.6 | New |
| Independent | Ihor Paryzkyi | 1,160 | 1.2 | New |
| Independent | Oleksandr Poplavskyi | 1,015 | 1.0 | New |
| Independent | Nadiya Sobenko | 881 | 0.9 | New |
| Independent | Oleksandr Melnyk | 746 | 0.8 | New |
| Independent | Valentyna Pohrebniak | 739 | 0.7 | New |
| KUN | Vyacheslav Berezovskyi | 609 | 0.6 | ▼1.3 |
| Others | | 1,141 | 1.2 | N/A |
| Total votes | | 98,198 | 100.0 | |
| Rejected ballots | | 3,266 | 3.2 | ▼2.6 |
| Turnout | | 102,620 | 59.7 | ▼2.1 |
| Registered electors | | 171,933 | | |
| Petro Poroshenko Bloc gain from Independent | | | | |

=== 2012 ===
2012 Ukrainian parliamentary election
| Party | Candidate | Votes | % |
|---|---|---|---|
| Independent | Oleksandr Dombrovskyi | 29,841 | 30.2 |
| Batkivshchyna | Nataliya Soleyko | 27,706 | 28.0 |
| UDAR | Lyudmyla Stanislavenko | 13,606 | 13.8 |
| KPU | Valery Bevz | 11,086 | 11.2 |
| Party of Regions | Nataliya Dobrynska | 6,391 | 6.5 |
| Independent | Victor Antemyuk | 3,958 | 4.0 |
| Independent | Vitaliy Dobrovolskyi | 3,664 | 3.7 |
| KUN | Vyacheslav Berezovskyi | 1,873 | 1.9 |
| Ukraine – Forward! | Roman Kulinich | 814 | 0.8 |
| Total votes | | 98,939 | 100.0 |
| Rejected ballots | | 6134 | 5.8 |
| Turnout | | 105,073 | 61.8 |
| Registered electors | | 169,940 | |
| Independent win (new seat) | | | |

== See also ==
- Electoral districts of Ukraine
- Foreign electoral district of Ukraine
