= Iryna Borzova =

Ukrainian businessman, politician

- Ірина Борзова
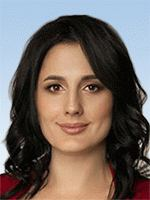
- Official Verkhovna Rada portrait, 2019

Member of the Verkhovna Rada
- Incumbent
- Assumed office 29 August 2019

Personal details
- Born: 28 August 1982 (age 44) Vinnytsia, Ukrainian SSR, Soviet Union
- Party: Servant of the People
- Spouse: Serhiy Borzov

Iryna Naumivna Borzova (Ukrainian: Ірина Наумівна Борзова; née Barulya; born 28 August 1982) is a Ukrainian business woman and politician. She was the People's Deputy of Ukraine of the IX convocation. She was a member of the Verkhovna Rada Committee on Youth and Sports, and Chairman of the Subcommittee on State Youth Policy.

== Biography ==
Together with her father Naum Barulei, Iryna Borzova owns Profil-N LLC, registered in the Crimean Sudak. The company operates restaurants. In 2014, after the occupation of Crimea by Russia, its business was re-registered in accordance with Russian law, and according to the tax service of the Russian Federation. In 2016, it earned a profit of about 600 thousand rubles. Iryna Borzova is also the owner of the "Delicious Hedgehog cafe" chain.

In the 2015 local elections, Iryna Borzova ran for the Vinnytsia City Council from Volodymyr Groysman's Vinnytsia European Strategy party. He is the chairman of the Vinnytsia city organization of the "Ukrainian House" political party.

In 2019, Borzova was elected People's Deputy of Ukraine in the single-mandate constituency № 14 (Zhmerynka, Barsky, Zhmerynsky, Litynsky, Tyvrivsky districts) from the "Servant of the People" party. During the nomination in her constituency, she presented gifts to children through the Irina Borzova Charitable Foundation, which journalists call a PR move. At the time of the election: natural person-entrepreneur, non-partisan. Lives in Vinnytsia.

She is a member of the "Servant of the People" party, chairwoman of the Vinnytsia regional organization.

== Family ==
She is married to her husband, Serhiy Borzov. They have 2 daughters, Anna and Yelyzaveta, and a son, Matviy.
