= Nataliya Zabolotna =

Ukrainian politician

- Наталя Заболотна
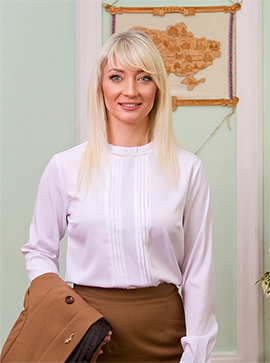

Governor of Vinnytsia Oblast
- Incumbent
- Assumed office 8 January 2026; Acting: 24 June 2024 – 7 January 2026
- President: Volodymyr Zelenskyy
- Preceded by: Serhiy Borzov

First Deputy Head of Vinnytsia Oblast State Administration
- Incumbent
- Assumed office August 2020

Deputy Head of Vinnytsia Oblast State Administration
- In office December 2019 – August 2020

Personal details
- Born: 19 August 1980 (age 46) Vinnytsia, Vinnytsia Oblast, Ukrainian SSR, Soviet Union
- Party: Servant of the People

Nataliya Mykhailivna Zabolotna (Ukrainian: Наталя Михайлівна Заболотна; born 19 August 1980) is a Ukrainian politician who is currently the Governor of Vinnytsia Oblast since 24 June 2024.

She had been the 1st Deputy Head of Vinnytsia Oblast State Administration.

== Biography ==
Nataliya Zabolotna was born in Vinnytsia on 19 August 1980.

From August 2000 to May 2001, she was the Head of the Vinnytsia Secondary Secondary School of Vinnytsia Secondary School No. 32.

From September 2001 to May 2002, she was the head of the Vinnytsia Secondary Secondary School of Vinnytsia Secondary School No. 32.

By that same year, she graduated from Vinnytsia State Pedagogical University named after Mikhail Kotsyubynsky, a specialty teacher of elementary classes and English in elementary grades.

From July 2002 to September 2003, she was the Chief Specialist of the Youth Department of the Department of Family and Youth of Vinnytsia Oblast State Administration.

From September 2003 to August 2005, she was the Head of the Youth Department of the Department of Family and Youth of Vinnytsia Oblast State Administration.

From August 2005 to April 2006, she was the Chief Specialist of the Department of Family, Children and Youth Department of the Department of Youth and Sports of Vinnytsia Regional State Administration.

From April 2006 to March 2007, she was the Chief Specialist of the Department of Family, Children and Youth Department of Family, Youth and Sports Department of Vinnytsia Regional State Administration.

In March 2007 to March 2008, she was promoted to the Deputy Head of the Department of Family, Children and Youth Department of Family, Youth and Sports of Vinnytsia Regional State Administration.

In April 2008 to July 2009, she was the Head of the Youth and Gender Policy Department of the Department of Family and Youth of Vinnytsia Regional State Administration.

Between July 2009 and August 2014, she was the Head of the Department of Youth and Gender Policy of the Department of Family and Youth of Vinnytsia Regional State Administration. In 2011, she graduated from the Odessa Regional Institute of Public Administration of NADU under the President of Ukraine, by specialty - Master of Public Administration.

In August 2014, she became the Deputy Head of the Department of Family and Youth of Vinnytsia Regional State Administration. In November 2015, she was the Deputy Head of the Department of Family, Youth and Sports of Vinnytsia Regional State Administration.

From November 2015 to December 2019, she was the Director of the Department of Social and Youth Policy of Vinnytsia Regional State Administration.

In December 2019, Zabolotna became the Deputy Head of Vinnytsia Oblast State Administration. In August 2020, she was promoted to the First Deputy Head of Vinnytsia Oblast State Administration.

Zabolotna had been a member of the Vinnytsia Oblast Council of the 8th convocation from the political party "Servant of the People". She had been the Deputy Chairman of the Permanent Commission of the Regional Council on Economics, Finance and Budget.

== Family ==
Zabolotna is married and is raising two daughters.
