= Mykola Dzhyha =

Ukrainian politician (born 1949)

Mykola Dzhyha Микола Васильович Джига
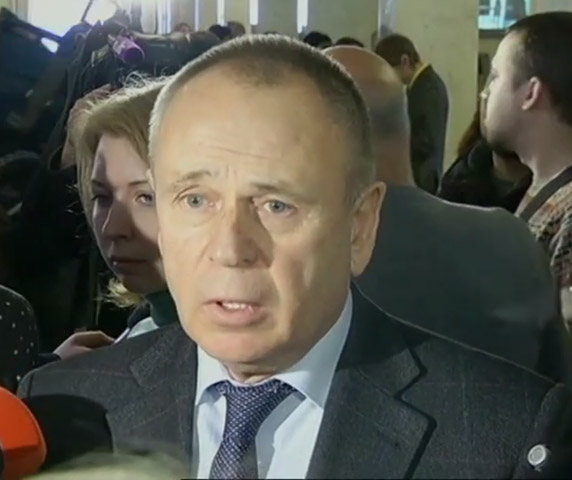
- in 2014

Governor of Vinnytsia Oblast
- In office 2010–2012
- Preceded by: Volodymyr Demishkan
- Succeeded by: Ivan Movchan

Personal details
- Born: Mykola Vasylyovych Dzhyha; 15 May 1949 (age 77) Yarove, Sharhorod Raion, Ukrainian SSR
- Party: Party of Regions
- Education: Academy of the USSR MVD; Kyiv University

Mykola Vasylyovych Dzhyha (Ukrainian: Микола Васильович Джига; born 15 May 1949, Yarove, Ukraine) is a Ukrainian career militsiya officer and later politician, member of the Verkhovna Rada. He is a Colonel General of Militsiya.

In 1966-1971 Dzhyha started with small low pay jobs in Fastiv. After finishing the Saratov specialized school of Militsiya, in 1973-2002 he made a career as a militsiya officer starting out as an investigator and finishing as a chief of the Central Administration for Combating Organized Crime (HUBOZ).

Between 2002 and 2004 Dzhyha headed the Interpol National Bureau in Ukraine and the Tax Militsiya Investigation Administration. Dzhyha was a closer colleague of the Minister of Internal Affairs Yuriy Kravchenko and conducted investigation relating to Georgiy Gongadze issue. Dzhyha also does not believe the official version that Kravchenko committed suicide. During one of the Dzhyha's investigation, the documents that were showing a rent of land lot where Mezhyhiria is located were removed from the Vyshhorod district administration (Mezhyhirya Residence is located in Vyshhorod Raion).

With small break in 2006-2014 he was a member of Verkhovna Rada representing Party of Regions. In 2010-2012 he served as a Governor of Vinnytsia Oblast.
