= Stanislav Bogdanovich =

Ukrainian chess grandmaster (1993–2020)

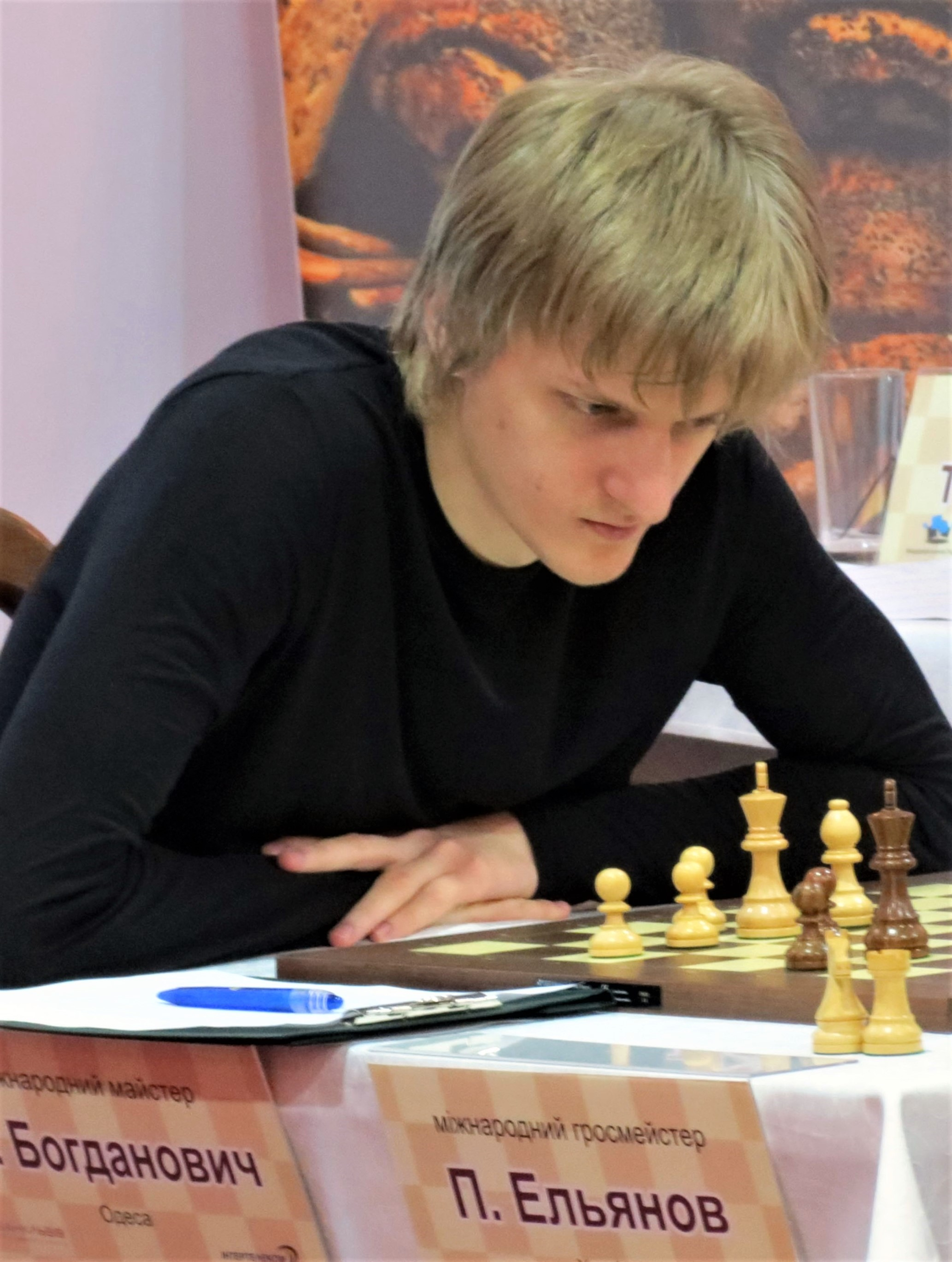
- Bogdanovich in 2014

Personal information
- Born: Stanislav Eduardovich Bogdanovich; 4 February 1993 Odesa, Ukraine
- Died: 5 March 2020 (aged 27) Moscow, Russia

Chess career
- Country: Ukraine
- Title: Grandmaster (2017)
- Peak rating: 2616 (September 2019)

Stanislav Eduardovich Bogdanovich (4 February 1993 – 5 March 2020) was a Ukrainian chess player who also competed for Russia.

== Early life ==
Bogdanovich graduated from the National University Odesa Law Academy.

== Chess career ==
- Silver medalist at the UEFA European Under-12 Championship [2]
- Ukrainian Under-18 champion
- Champion of Odesa (2010)
- Ukrainian blitz champion (2013)

He was awarded the title of International Master in 2009, and Grandmaster in 2017.

== Death ==
Bogdanovich was found dead on 5 March 2020 in his Moscow apartment, alongside nitrous oxide-filled balloons and the body of his girlfriend, Alexandra Vernigora, also a chess player. Police did not suspect foul play. Other reports suggest that the couple were found with bags over their faces. The incident happened a few days after an event where Bogdanovich competed for Russia against Ukraine.
