= Mykhaylo Chemberzhi =

Ukrainian composer, teacher, scientist, and politician

Mykhaylo Chemberzhi Михайло Чембержі
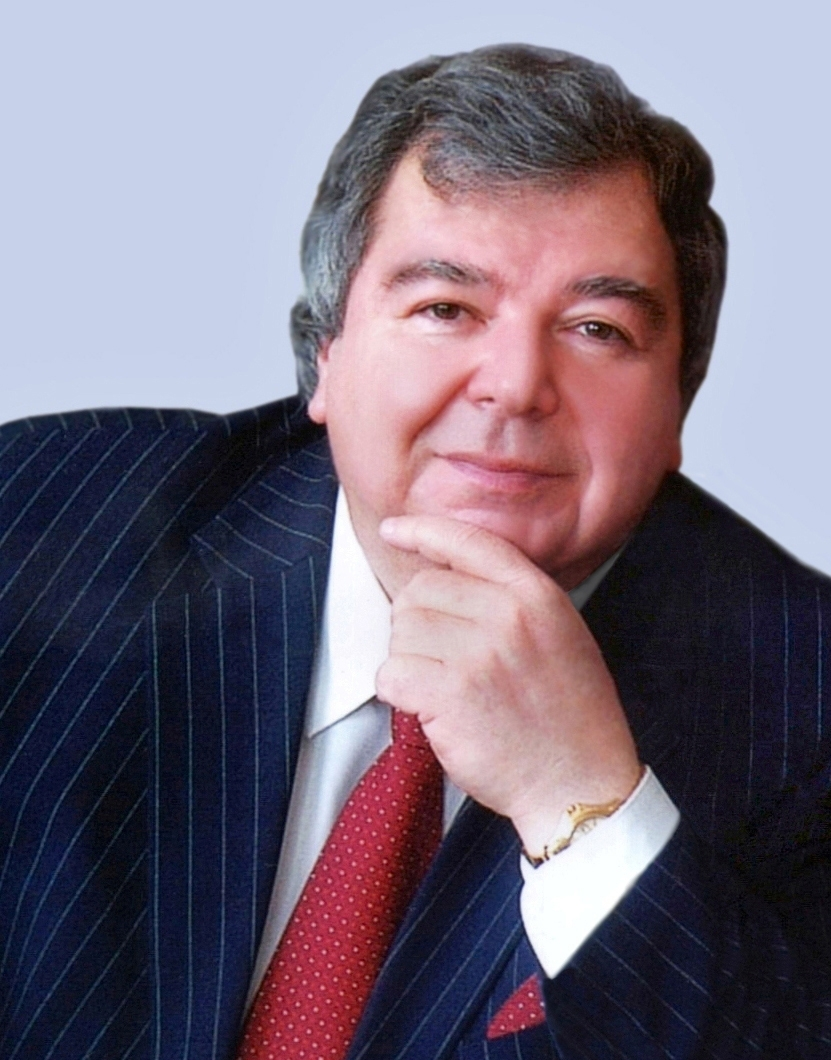

Background information
- Born: July 15, 1944; Izmail, Ukrainian SFSR, Soviet Union
- Died: March 5, 2018 (aged 73) Kyiv, Ukraine
- Genres: Classical
- Occupation: Composer

Mykhaylo Ivanovych Chemberzhi (Note: Ukrainian: Михайло Іванович Чембержі, romanized: Mykhailo Ivanovych Chemberzhi) (Ukrainian: Михайло Іванович Чембержі, 15 July 1944 – 5 March 2018) was a Ukrainian composer, teacher, scientist and politician. Director of Kyiv Children's Academy of Arts.

== Biography ==
He was born on July 15, 1944, in the city of Izmail, Odesa region. In 1967, he graduated from the Odesa State Music College, began his teaching career at the children's music school in Izmail.

== Scientific publication ==
Author of about 60 scholarly publications. Composer of works in a variety of genres, including orchestral works, opera and ballet.
