= Myroslav Popovych =

Myroslav Popovych, DA (Ukrainian: Мирослав Володимирович Попович; 12 April 1930, Zhytomyr – 10 February 2018, Kyiv) was a Ukrainian philosopher, professor, Academician of the National Academy of Sciences of Ukraine. Laureate of Shevchenko National Prize in 2001. He authored the book Chervone Stolittia.

== Biography ==
External images
- №-1.
- №-2.
- №-3.
- №-4

Popovych was born on 12 April 1930 in Zhytomyr, in the Ukrainian SSR of the Soviet Union (in present-day Ukraine). In 1953 he graduated from the Taras Shevchenko University, philosophy department. In 2001 he became the director of the Skovoroda Institute of Philosophy of the National Academy of Sciences of Ukraine. In 2003 he was elected Academician of the Ukrainian National Academy of Sciences.

== Publications ==
- "On the Philosophical Analysis of the Science Language" ("О философском анализе языка науки") (1966)
- "Logic and Scientific Cognition" ("Логіка і наукове пізнання" (1971)
- "Philosophical Aspects of Semantics" ("Философские вопросы семантики" (1975)
- "Outline of History of Logical Ideas in the Context of Culture and History" ("Очерк истории логических идей в культурно-историческом контексте") (1979)
- "Hryhoriy Skovoroda" ("Григорій Сковорода") (1984, co-authorship)
- "Outlook of Ancient Slavs" ("Мировозрение древних словян» (1985)
- "Mykola Gogol" ("Микола Гоголь» (1989)
- "Ukraine and Europe: the Rightists and the Leftists" ("Україна і Європа: праві і ліві") (1996)
- "Rationality and Dimensions of Human Life" ("Раціональність і виміри людського буття» (1997)
- "Outline of the History of Ukrainian Culture" ("Нарис історії культури України") (1999)
- "Universal Encyclopedia" ("Універсальний словник-енциклопедія") (1999, chief editor)
- "Red Century" ("Червоне століття") (2005)
- "Being Human" ("Бути людиною") (2011)
