= Pavlyna Shapovalenko =

Ukrainian milk machine operator (1949–2020)

Hero of Ukraine Pavlyna Shapovalenko OS
- Born: Pavlyna Shapovalenko; 11 September 1949; Vonihove, Tiachiv, Zakarpattia Oblast, Ukrainian SSR, Soviet Union
- Died: 27 April 2020 (aged 70)
- Occupation: Milk machine operator
- Years active: 1963–2020
- Awards: Hero of Ukraine; Order of the Red Banner of Labour; Order of Lenin

Pavlyna Shapovalenko (Ukrainian: Шаповаленко Павлина Михайлівна; 11 September 1949 – 27 April 2020) was a Ukrainian milk machine operator who worked in Tiachiv later the Sumy Raion. She worked on state farms during her life and worked to maximise productivity of the animals on the farm and collected a large amount of milk from cows. Shapovalenko received the government issued Order of the Red Banner of Labour in 1973, the Order of Lenin in 1977, and was made a Hero of Ukraine in 2001.

== Biography ==
On 11 September 1949, Shapovalenko was born in the village of Vonihove, in the district of Tiachiv, Zakarpattia Oblast. She graduated from the Vonigiv eight-year school in 1964. According to her, she became interested in science after reading about record-setting milkmaid Maria Savchenko in a newspaper. Spahovalenko began working at the state farm called Ilyich's Testament as a milkmaid when she was fourteen years old. During this time, she became well known in the local area and achieved the record of becoming the first milkmaid to extract 6,500 litres (1,400 imp gal; 1,700 US gal) of milk from a single cow per year. Shapovalenko would later work on the Verkhovyna state farm in the Vonihiv branch between 1966 and 1969.

She relocated to the village of Velyki Vilmy in the Sumy Raion, located in the Sumy Oblast in 1969. Shapovalenko had planned to live in the village on a seasonal basis but she remained there for the rest of her life. She was employed as a milking machine operator on the dairy farm of the collective farm called "May Day" (today the agricultural production cooperative "Agrofirm" May Day). Shapovalenko assisted in helping the farm to raise heifers for the group she worked with and was able to milk a firstborn. She worked to maximise the productivity of the animals on the farm. She was one of the first people in the Sumy Raion to collect 5,000 kilograms (11,000 lb) then 6,000 kilograms (13,000 lb) of milk from cows annually. In 1973, Shapovlaneko received the government issued Order of the Red Banner of Labour and the Order of Lenin four years later. She milked a total of 184,168 kilograms (406,021 lb) as well as 6,572 kilograms (14,489 lb) from a single cow in 2000. Shapovlaneko was made a Hero of Ukraine by president Leonid Kuchma in November 2001 "For many years of selfless work in agriculture, the achievement of the highest rates in the region on milk yield".

During her life, she had collected approximately 3,600 tonnes (3,500 long tons; 4,000 short tons) of milk. On three occasions, she was elected to serve as a deputy on the regional council. Upon her retiring, Shapovlaneko opened a school for milkmaids, and attracts breeders from not just the Sumy Raion but also from other neighbouring districts and obalsts. She was the organiser and honorary president of a club called six thousand. She was married to the animal husbandry worker Mikhail Ivanovich, with whom she had two children. Shapovalenko died on 27 April 2020 and was buried in the village of Velyki Vilmy.
