= Lidiia Hryhorchuk =

Ukrainian linguist

- Born: Lidiia Mikhailovna Hryhorchuk; 24 November 1926; Lviv, Ukraine
- Died: 14 January 2018 (aged 91); Lviv, Ukraine
- Education: University of Lviv
- Occupations: Linguist; Linguogeographer; Dialectologist; Paleographer; Art critic; Professor; Doctor of philology
- Years active: 1956–2018
- Employer: University of Lviv
- Awards: State Prize of Ukraine in Science and Technology

Lidiia Mikhailovna Hryhorchuk (Ukrainian: Григорчук Лідія Михайлівна; 24 November 1926 – 14 January 2018) was a Ukrainian linguist, linguogeographer, dialectologist, paleographer, art critic, professor and a doctor of philology. She was a junior researcher at the Institute of Ukrainian Studies of the National Academy of Sciences of Ukraine from 1956 to 1972 before becoming a senior researcher between 1999 and 2002. Hryhorchuk was a professor of philology at the University of Lviv, her alma mater, and at the Lviv National Academy of Arts. She was elected to the Shevchenko Scientific Society in 1992 and was appointed a Laureate of the State Prize of Ukraine in Science and Technology in 2006.

== Biography ==
On 24 November 1926, Hryhorchuk was born in Lviv. She was a 1949 law graduate of the University of Lviv. In 1950, Hryhorchuk was illegally imprisoned in the camps of Tayshet in the Irkutsk Oblast and later in Mordovia. She was successfully rehabilitated in 1956.

From 1956 to 1972, Hryhorchuk worked as a junior researcher at the Institute of Ukrainian Studies of the National Academy of Sciences of Ukraine. She went on to work as a researcher at the Central State Historical Archive of Ukraine between 1973 and 1982. Hryhorchuk worked at the Andrey Sheptytsky National Museum of Lviv from 1988 to 1988. She also worked as a professor of philology at the University of Lviv from 1997 onwards and at the Lviv National Academy of Arts between 1999 and 2000. From 2000 to 2002, she returned to the Institute of Ukrainian Studies of the National Academy of Sciences of Ukraine working as a senior researcher. As a professor, she educated masters and students through special courses in Ukrainian linguistic geography, paleography and epigraphy. Hryhorchuk was elected to the Shevchenko Scientific Society on 28 March 1992. She received the honorary award For achievements in the development of culture and art in 2005 and she was appointed a Laureate of the State Prize of Ukraine in Science and Technology in 2006.

She was the writer of the book Adverb in modern Ukrainian literary language: Specifics of connections and meanings that was published in 1964. Hryhorchuk went on to work on Images of dialectal phenomena and tendencies in the second volume of the Atlas of the Ukrainian language that was published in 1970. In 1978, she authored the book Book fonts and dipints of works of Ukrainian art of 14 – 15 centuries, published Inscriptions on works of Ukrainian painting and the font of Francisk Skorina's publications in 1980, Book fonts and dipints of works of Ukrainian art of the XIV-XV centuries in 1981, and Inscriptions on works of Ukrainian painting and the font of Francisk Skorina's publications in 1983. She was the editor and co-author of the second edition of the Atlas of the Ukrainian Language in 1988. In 1990, Hryhorchuk published the third edition of Thoughts on the emergence of "Ukrainian spelling". She also published New on the oldest examples of Ukrainian painting in 1991, Ukrainian dialect paroxytonic accent in 1993, Special Ukrainian dialect formation in 1995, Ukrainian dialect space in the assessment of linguistic geography in 2001, the monograph Linguistic and geographical study of the Ukrainian dialect space. in 2002, Uns erased Traces in 2008, and the monograph Relief of the Ukrainian language space (continuous studies) in 2013.

She died on 14 January 2018 in Lviv.
