= Nadiya Babych =

Ukrainian linguist (1943–2021)

Naidya Babych
- Born: Nadiya Denisovna Babych; 29 December 1943; Cernăuți, Cernăuți County, Kingdom of Romania
- Died: 12 April 2021 (aged 77)
- Occupations: Linguist; Journalist; Philologist
- Years active: 1966–2021
- Awards: Order of Princess Olga, Third Class

Nadiya Denisovna Babych (Ukrainian: Бабич Надія Денисівна; 29 December 1943 – 12 April 2021) was a Ukrainian linguist, journalist, and philologist. A faculty member of her alma mater, Chernivtsi University, she was the author of approximately 280 texts (prefaces to publications, scientific articles and reviews) on stylistics, the culture of language, rhetoric, phraseology, history of language, sociolinguistics, Ukrainian studies, inter-lingual and intercultural contacts and the history of pedagogy in Bukovina. Babych was appointed Order of Princess Olga, Third Class in 2007.

== Early life ==
Babych was born in Chernivtsi on 29 December 1943. When she was young, she had the objective of becoming a doctor. Babych was a 1966 honours graduate of Chernivtsi University's Department of Ukrainian Language and Literature of the Philological Faculty. While at university, she worked as an seamstress at an rubber and shoe factory as well as doing proofreading at the university and later the regional printing house.

== Career ==
In 1966, she began working as a faculty member of Chernivtsi University. Babych was initially a senior laboratory assistant, then worked as a lecturer at the department, then variously as an associate professor a professor (from 1995), the head of the department of history and culture of the Ukrainian language. Her research interests were the history of language, linguistic psychology, methods of language teaching and ethical and aesthetic problems of language functioning, phraseology, speech culture, stylistics and sociolinguistics. She broadcast on the radio programme Language. Man. Chas for approximately two decades and was a writer for the Romanian language edition of Ukrainske Slovo. Babych authored, co-authored, compiled and was editor-in-chief of extensive textbooks and manuals concerning the history of the Ukrainian literary language, stylistics and speech culture basics, professional Ukrainian language, theory and practice of translation and the teaching of the Ukrainian language in schools in Hungary, Poland and Romania.

There were about 280 texts (prefaces to publications, scientific articles and reviews) on stylistics, the culture of language, rhetoric, phraseology, history of language, sociolinguistics, Ukrainian studies, inter-lingual and intercultural contacts and the history of pedagogy in Bukovina published by Babych during her lifetime. Such manuals that she authored include the first two parts of Phraseology of the Ukrainian language in 1970 and 1971 as well as Practical stylistics: Workshop in 1977. In 1983, Babych wrote History of the Ukrainian Literary Language: Workshop, Fundamentals of Speech Culture in 1990, History of the Ukrainian Literary Language: A Practical Course in 1993, The Power of the Spoken Word in 1996 and Practical Stylistics in 1997. She was also the author of Rhetoric: Workshop in 1999 and Linguistic and psychological foundations of language teaching and learning in 2000. Babych was co-author of Business in Ukrainian Language in 1996, Culture of business speech in 1997 and Dictionary of surnames of Chernivtsi residents in 2002.

She was active in the cultural life of Bukovina and was a board member of the regional organisation of the Prosvita society since its establishment. Babych was a member of the National Union of Journalists of Ukraine.

== Death ==
On 12 April 2021, she died of heart failure. A funeral for Babych took place two days later.

== Awards ==
She received the Gratitude from the President of Ukraine in October 2000. In November 2007, Babych was appointed Order of Princess Olga, Third Class "for significant personal contribution to the socio-economic, scientific, technical and cultural development of Ukraine, significant achievements in labor, many years of hard work and on the occasion of the anniversary of confirmation of the All-Ukrainian referendum on December 1, 1991 Act of Independence of Ukraine" by president Viktor Yanukovych.

She was made Honored Worker of Ukraine "for significant personal contribution to the socio-economic, scientific and technical, cultural and educational development of the Ukrainian state, significant labor achievements, many years of hard work" by Yanukovych in November 2013. She also received the Excellence in Education of Ukraine Badge, the Omelyan Popovich Prize and the Medal of Saints Cyril and Methodius of the Ukrainian Orthodox Church of the Kyiv Patriarchate.
