= Oleh Honcharuk (officer) =

Ukrainian soldier

Hero of Ukraine Oleh Honcharuk
- Олег Гончарук

Personal details
- Born: Oleh Mykolaiovych Honcharuk; 1983 (age 42–43)

Military service
- Allegiance: Ukraine
- Branch/service: Armed Forces of Ukraine
- Rank: Colonel
- Battles/wars: Russo-Ukrainian War
- Awards: Hero of Ukraine; Order of Bohdan Khmelnytskyi; Order for Courage

Oleh Mykolaiovych Honcharuk (Ukrainian: Олег Миколайович Гончарук, born 1983) is a Ukrainian soldier, colonel of the Armed Forces of Ukraine, a participant of the Russian-Ukrainian war. Hero of Ukraine (2022).

== Biography ==
As of 2017, he held the position of First Deputy Chief of Staff of the 128th Mountain Assault Brigade. As of 2018, he was the acting brigade commander. From 19 November 2019, to 11 September 2022, he was the commander of the 128th Mountain Assault Brigade.

Together with the brigade, Honcharuk took part in the Joint Forces Operation in Donbas, in particular in the battles for Stanytsia Luhanska, and in the first months of the full-scale war he held the defense on the eastern and southeastern directions, in particular in Mykolaiv Oblast. Since the end of the summer of 2022, the 128th Brigade participated in the liberation of the Kherson Oblast.

== Awards ==
- the title of Hero of Ukraine with the Order of the Golden Star (14 October 2022)
- Order of Bohdan Khmelnytskyi, 1st class (2022)
- Order of Bohdan Khmelnytskyi, 2nd class (2022)
- Order of Bohdan Khmelnytskyi, 3rd class (2021)
- Order for Courage, 3rd class (2018)
