= Oleksandr Dombrovskyi =

Ukrainian politician (born 1962)

Oleksandr Dombrovskyi Олександр Георгійович Домбровський
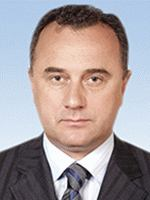

Governor of Vinnytsia Oblast
- In office 2005–2010
- Preceded by: Hryhoriy Kaletnik
- Succeeded by: Volodymyr Demishkan

Personal details
- Born: Oleksandr Heorhiyovych Dombrovskyi; 7 July 1962 (age 64) Kalynivka, Kalynivka Raion, Ukrainian SSR
- Party: Petro Poroshenko Bloc; Our Ukraine; People's Democratic Party
- Education: Vinnytsia National Technical University; Institute of International Relations of Kyiv University; NASU Institute of World Economy and international relations

Oleksandr Heorhiyovych Dombrovskyi (Ukrainian: Олександр Георгійович Домбровський; born 7 July 1962) is a Ukrainian politician. He served as a member of the Verkhovna Rada (the Ukrainian parliament) from Ukraine's 11th electoral district from 2012 to 2019, and as Governor of Vinnytsia Oblast previously from 2005 to 2010.

== Early life ==
Dombrovskyi was born on 7 July 1962 in Kalynivka, which was then part of the Ukrainian SSR in the Soviet Union. In 1979, he graduated from the Vinnytsia National Technical University within the Faculty of Automation and Telemechanics with honors. He then entered into postgraduate studies, eventually receiving his PhD in economics from the university.

After completing his studies, from 1990 to 1991 he was the head of the Department of Foreign Economic Research of the Vinnytsia City Center of the STTM. Afterwards, he was the director of the foreign trade company "Center", and then in 1995 president of the JSC "Podilskyi Center for Business Cooperation". Up until his election to mayor in 2002, he was the director of the second branch division of Pivdenmash (then known as Yuzhmash).

== Political career ==
In 2002–2005 Dombrovskyi was a mayor of Vinnytsia.

In 2005–2010 he also served as a Governor of Vinnytsia Oblast.

In the 2012 Ukrainian parliamentary election Dombrovskyi was elected to parliament as an independent candidate in constituency number 11 located in Vinnytsia Oblast However, in February 2013, the Higher Administrative Court of Ukraine annulled his mandate, ruling that the 2012 election results for the single-mandate district no. 11 could not be reliably established due to irregularities after a lawsuit was filed by Yurii Karmazin. As a result, CEC was ordered to hold a repeat election in the district. In the 2014 Ukrainian parliamentary election he was reelected in the same constituency for Petro Poroshenko Bloc. Dombrovskyi did not take part in the 2019 Ukrainian parliamentary election.

== See also ==
- List of mayors of Vinnytsia
