= Serhiy Borzov =

Ukrainian politician

- Сергій Борзов
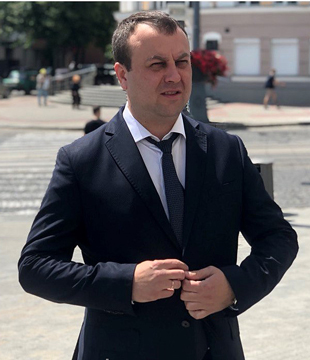

Governor of Vinnytsia Oblast
- In office 19 June 2020 – 25 June 2024
- Preceded by: Vladyslav Skalsky
- Succeeded by: Nataliya Zabolotna (acting)

Head of the State Administration of Affairs
- In office 1 August 2019 – 19 June 2020
- Preceded by: Ivan Kutsyk
- Succeeded by: Ihor Lysyy

Personal details
- Born: Serhiy Serhiyovych Borzov; 12 April 1980 (age 46) Vinnytsia, Ukraine, Soviet Union
- Party: Servant of the People
- Spouse: Iryna Borzova
- Children: Anna; Yelyzaveta; Matviy

Serhiy Serhiyovych Borzov (Ukrainian: Сергій Сергійович Борзов; born 12 April 1980), is a Ukrainian politician, and manager who has served as the Governor of Vinnytsia Oblast (19 June 2020.-25 June 2024).

== Biography ==
Serhiy Borzov was born in Vinnytsia on 12 April 1980.

He graduated from the historical faculty of Vinnytsia State Pedagogical University.

In 2006, Borzov was a candidate for the 5th Vinnytsia City Council from the Liberal Ukraine party.

From 2006 to 2011, he is the Director of the KVN team "Vinnytsia Peppers". In 2010 he was a candidate for the Vinnytsia Regional Council of the 6th from the Front for Change party.

From 2011 to 2012, he was the Director of the KVN team "National Team of Ukraine". He worked in the Russian creative association "Aleksandr Maslyakov and Company".

Since June 2014, he was the Deputy Head of the State Tax Service.

From 28 August 2015 to 23 July 2016, 11 June - 1 August 2019 - temporarily served as head of the State Tax Service.

Borzov was member of the Council for the Development of the Mystetskyi Arsenal National Art and Culture Museum Complex.

From 1 August 2019 to 19 June 2020, Borzov was head of the State Administration (DUS).

Borzov was the candidate for the mayor of Vinnytsia in 2020, from the party Servant of the People.

On 19 June 2020, Borzov became the Governor of Vinnytsia Oblast, replacing Vladyslav Skalsky.

He was awarded the civil servant of the 2nd rank.

== Family ==
His wife is a public figure and politician Iryna Borzova. They have 2 daughters, Anna and Yelyzaveta, and a son, Matviy.
