= Volodymyr Hunchyk =

Ukrainian politician and engineer

- Володимир Гунчик

Governor of Volyn Oblast
- In office 24 July 2014 – 22 March 2018
- Preceded by: Hryhoriy Pustovit
- Succeeded by: Oleksandr Savchenko

Personal details
- Born: Volodymyr Petrovych Hunchyk; 9 March 1958 (age 68) Kamin-Kashyrskyi, Ukrainian SSR, Soviet Union

Volodymyr Petrovych Hunchyk (Ukrainian: Володимир Петрович Гунчик; born on 9 March 1958), is a Ukrainian politician and engineer, who was the Governor of Volyn Oblast from July 24, 2014 to March 22, 2018.

== Biography ==
Volodymyr Hunchyk was born in Kamin-Kashyrskyi, on 9 March 1958.

In 1978, he began his labor activity by the electrical installer-circuit designer and the category of the collective workshop of the Zaporizhzhya Industrial Association "Convertor". From 1979 to 1983, he was an engineer of department of transformation of the Institute of Electrodynamics of the Academy of Sciences of the USSR.

From 1987 to 1989, he was an instructor of the organisational department of the Lutsk City Committee of the Communist Party of Ukraine. He was also the instructor of the industrial and transport department of the Volyn Oblast Council of the Communist Party of Ukraine.

In the 2014 presidential election, he was appointed Governor of Volyn Oblast by the inaugurating president, Petro Poroshenko.

He left office on March 22, 2018.
