= Yuriy Tkachenko =

Ukrainian economist and businessman

- Юрій Ткаченко

Governor of Cherkasy Oblast
- In office 15 March 2014 – 20 November 2018
- Preceded by: Serhiy Tulub
- Succeeded by: Oleksandr Velbivets

Personal details
- Born: 12 November 1972 (age 53) Bolhrad, Ukraine, Soviet Union

Yuriy Olegovich Tkachenko (Ukrainian: Юрій Олегович Ткаченко, romanized: Yurii Olehovych Tkachenko; born 12 November 1972, Bolhrad, Odesa Oblast) is a Ukrainian economist and businessman who was from 15 March 2014 until 20 November 2018 the head of the Cherkassy Oblast State Administration.

== Biography ==
Education: Izmail State Pedagogical Institute (1995), primary school teacher; Kyiv Institute of Bankers of Bank "Ukraine" (1997), economist.

1990-1995 - student of the Izmail State Pedagogical Institute.

1995-1999 - analytical engineer, head of security service, chief economist of Zolotonosha branch of JSCB "Ukraine", Cherkasy region.

1999 - Head of the Drabiv Branch of the Ukrainian Bank in Cherkasy region.

1999-2000 - Director of the Cherkasy branch of JSCB Legbank.

2000-2002 - Head of the Cherkasy Regional Branch of the State Innovation Company.

2002-2005 - Head of the Cherkasy Regional Department of the State Savings Bank of Ukraine.

2005-2010 - Head of the State Tax Administration of Cherkasy region.

2006-2010 - deputy of the Cherkasy Oblast Council of the V convocation from the "Our Ukraine" party, Chairman of the Standing Committee on Planning, Budget and Finance.

On March 15, 2014, he was appointed by Oleksandr Turchynov as the head of the Cherkasy Regional State Administration.

On September 9, 2014, President Petro Poroshenko reappointed Tkachenko as the head of the Cherkasy Regional State Administration.

On November 20, 2018, he was dismissed from the post of the head of the RSA.

On November 27, 2018, he was appointed Advisor to the President of Ukraine.

== Awards ==
- Orders of Merit, III class.
