= Oleksiy Savchenko =

Ukrainian footballer

Personal information
- Full name: Oleksiy Vitaliyovych Savchenko
- Date of birth: 27 September 1993 (age 33)
- Place of birth: Starovirivka, Krasnohrad Raion, Kharkiv Oblast, Ukraine
- Height: 1.77 m (5 ft 10 in)
- Position: Midfielder

Team information
- Current team: Podillya Khmelnytskyi
- Number: 7

Youth career
- 2006–2010: UFK Kharkiv

Senior career*
Years	Team	Apps	(Gls)
2011–2016	Dynamo Kyiv	0	(0)
2013–2015	→ Dynamo-2 Kyiv	54	(3)
2015–2016	→ Hoverla Uzhhorod (loan)	21	(0)
2016–2017	Cherkaskyi Dnipro	22	(2)
2017–2018	Poltava	31	(3)
2018	Chornomorets Odesa	14	(1)
2019	Polissya Zhytomyr	10	(1)
2019–2023	Obolon Kyiv	53	(3)
2023–2024	Viktoriya Sumy	17	(1)
2024–	Podillya Khmelnytskyi	11	(0)
- * Club domestic league appearances and goals as of 10 June 2025

Oleksiy Vitaliyovych Savchenko (Ukrainian: Олексій Віталійович Савченко; born 27 September 1993) is a Ukrainian professional footballer who plays as a midfielder for Podillya Khmelnytskyi.

== Career ==
Savchenko is a product of the UFC Kharkiv youth sportive school and in the beginning of 2011 he signed a contract with FC Dynamo Kyiv.

He spent his career in the Ukrainian First League club FC Dynamo-2 Kyiv. In July 2015 Savchenko went on loan to FC Hoverla in the Ukrainian Premier League and made his debut in the Ukrainian Premier League for this club in a match against FC Dnipro Dnipropetrovsk as the main-squad player on 19 July 2015.
