= Oleksandr Fyshchuk =

Ukrainian politician

Oleksandr Fyshchuk Олександр Фищук
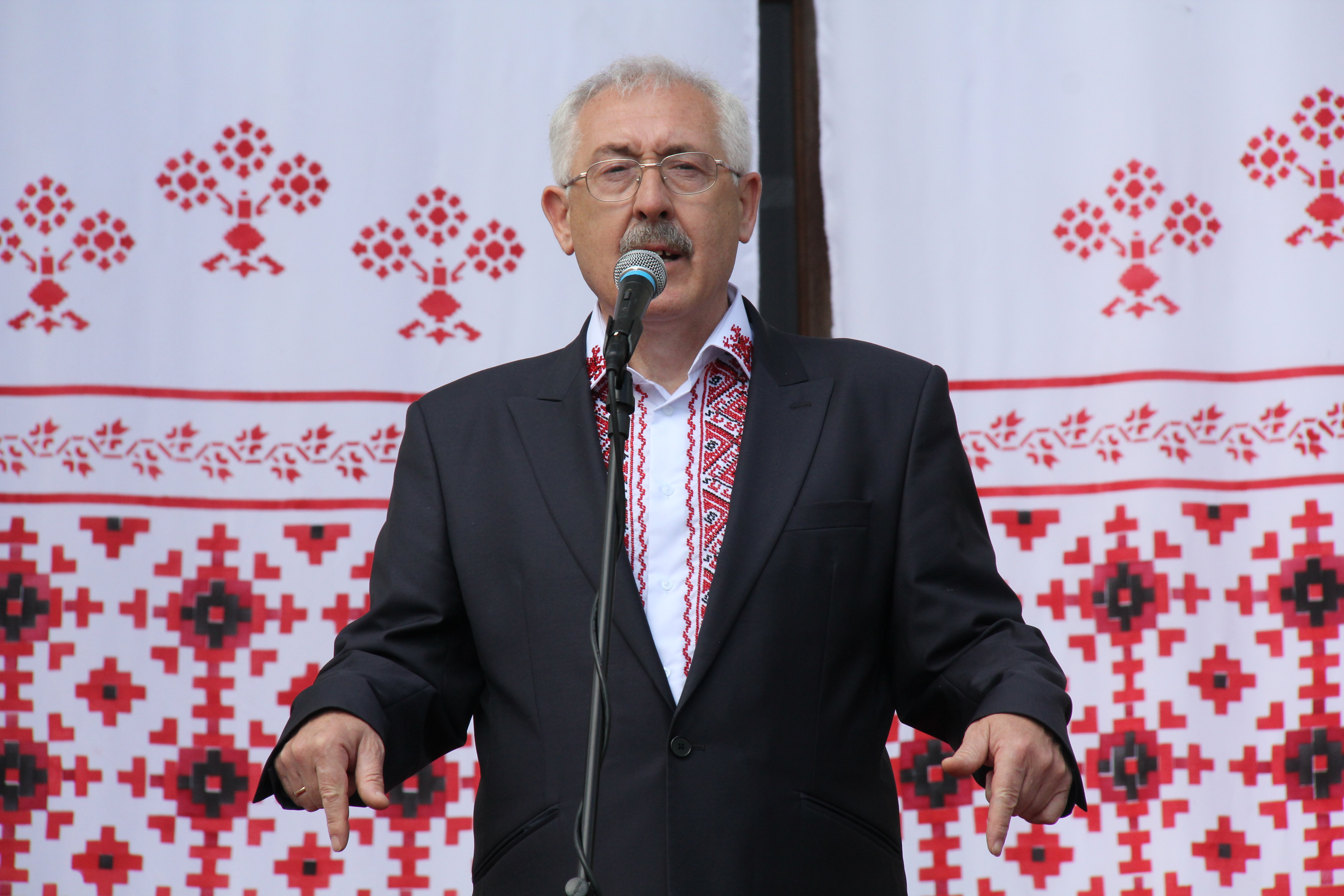

Governor of Chernivtsi Oblast
- In office 5 February 2015 – 24 November 2018
- Preceded by: Roman Marchuk (acting)

Personal details
- Born: Oleksandr Heorhiyovych Fyshchuk; 12 January 1958 (age 68) Borivtsi, Kitsman Raion, Ukrainian SSR
- Party: People's Front; Front for Change
- Education: Chernivtsi University

Oleksandr Heorhiyovych Fyshchuk (Ukrainian: Олександр Георгійович Фищук; born 12 January 1958, Borivtsi, Ukraine) is a Ukrainian state official and later politician. Fyshchuk most notably served as a People's Deputy of Ukraine in the Verkhovna Rada, the parliament of Ukraine, from 2012 to 2014 in constituency No. 202, which is located within Chernivtsi, and as Governor of Chernivtsi Oblast from 2015 to 2018 when he voluntarily resigned.

== Early life ==
Fyshchuk was born on 12 January 1958 in Borivtsi, which was then part of Chernivtsi Oblast within the Ukrainian SSR. After graduating from secondary school, he worked as a driver in Kitsman, served in the Soviet Army, and worked as a site foreman at the Graviton plant. After returning to school to complete his postgraduate studies, he achieved a specialist degree in physics from Chernivtsi University.

He then worked as an electrician and foreman at the Chernivtsi Rubber Plant, and then as an inspector in the Leninsky District Committee in Chernivtsi. He again went back to school to his alma mater, and in 1992 received a bachelor's in economics. In 1990-2011 with breaks he worked at the State Tax Administration in Chernivtsi Oblast. He then entered the Chernivtsi Regional Council as a deputy as a member of the NGO "Front for Change", which he did until his election to the Verkhovna Rada.

== Political career ==
In 2012-2014 Fyshchuk was a member of the Verkhovna Rada as a non-partisan deputy of Batkivshchyna party. He was elected to single-mandate constituency No. 202 (Chernivtsi) after having received 40.31% of the vote. He later served in the parliament on the Committee for the Budget. From 5 February 2015 until 24 November 2018 he served as Governor of Chernivtsi Oblast. There has been various rumours about why he resigned early, including wanting to fire the heads of customs Mykola Salahor or that Fyshchuk's relatives had violated customs legislation.

After serving as governor, he became a sponsor for the Strength and Honor party. During the 2019 Ukrainian parliamentary election, he attempted to run again for constituency No. 202, this time representing the Strength and Honor party but he failed to win the election. In September 2020, he announced he would run for the upcoming elections to be Mayor of Chernivtsi as a self-nominated candidate.
