= Serhiy Kuzmenko =

Ukrainian businessman and politician

- Сергій Кузьменко
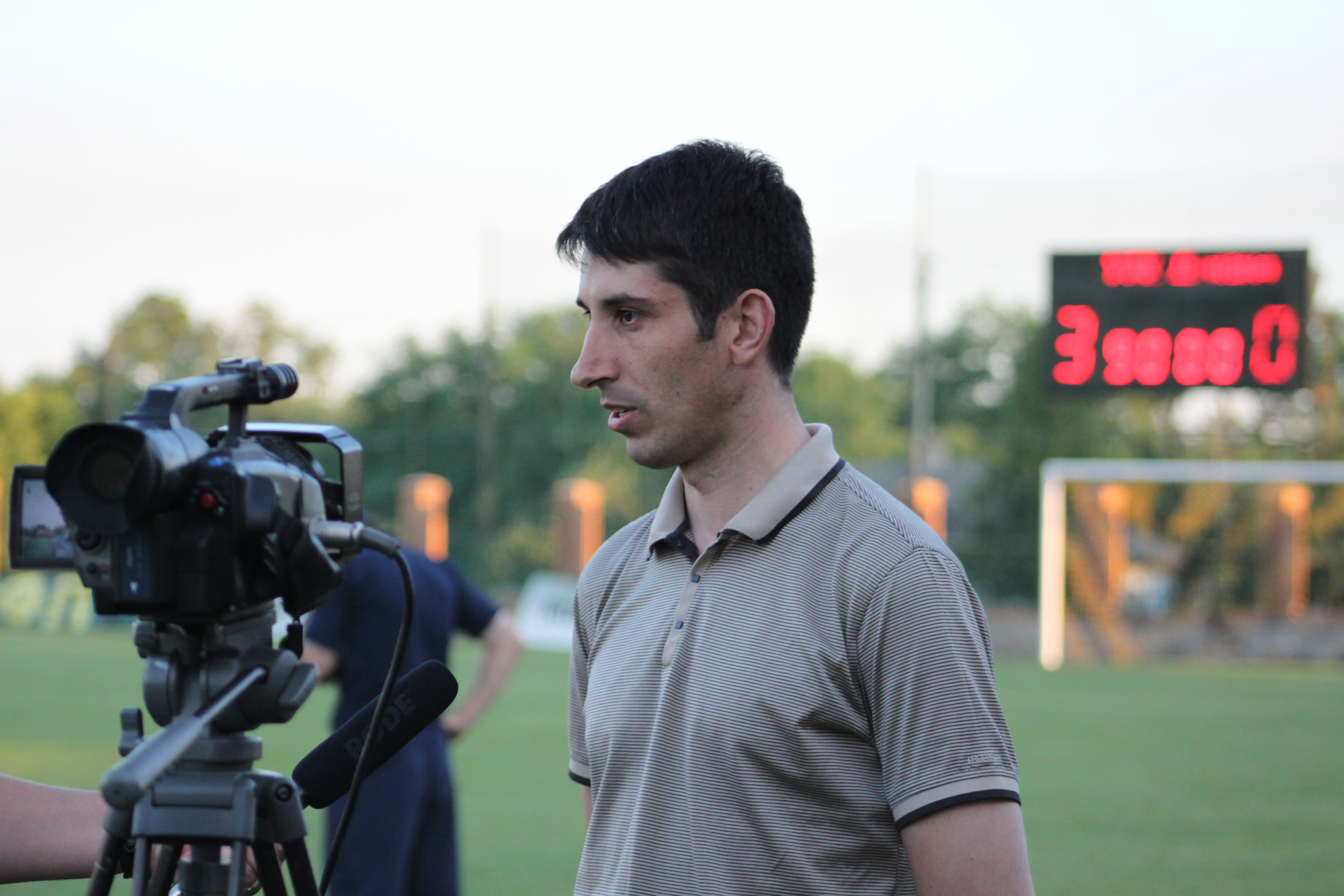
- Kuzmenko in 2011

Mayor of Oleksandriia
- Incumbent
- Assumed office 4 December 2020

Personal details
- Born: 22 January 1975 (age 51) Oleksandriia, Ukrainian SSR, Soviet Union
- Children: 2
- Occupation: State official; businessman

Serhiy Anatoliyovych Kuzmenko (Ukrainian: Сергій Анатолійович Кузьменко, born 22 January 1975) is a Ukrainian politician, businessman. In the 2020 Ukrainian local elections he was elected, as a nonpartisan politician, the mayor of Oleksandriia.

Kuzmenko is a former head of the Kirovohrad Regional State Administration (Governor of Kirovohrad Oblast) from 16 September 2014 until 2019.

== Biography ==
After graduating the Kirovohrad National Technical University in 1997, Kuzmenko worked at the family business Holovkivska Agro-Firm out of Holovkivka which in 2000 became known as "UkrAhroKom".

In 2002, he went into politics becoming a council deputy of the Oleksandriia Raion council and in 2010–2012 was head of the Oleksandriia Raion State Administration. In 2011 Kuzmenko graduated the Dnipropetrovsk Regional Institute of the National Academy for Public Administration.

In 2012 Kuzmenko became a deputy head of the Kirovohrad Regional State Administration, but at the end of 2012 was elected as a member of Party of Regions to the Verkhovna Rada (Ukrainian parliament). After the Euromaidan, he left the party. At the end of September 2014, Kuzmenko was appointed head of the Kirovohrad Regional State Administration. There were protests against this appointment, activists accused Kuzmenko of having supported the 2013 so called "anti-protest laws and of having hired "Titushky" to beat up Euromaidan protesters. Kuzmenko denied all these charges. He also added that he was never part of the so-called "anti-Maidan.

In the 2020 Ukrainian local elections Kuzmenko was elected (as a self-nominated candidate) mayor of Oleksandriia with 57,21 of the votes.

== Business and philanthropy ==
Along with his father, Kuzmenko own a family business known as "UkrAhroKom" which owns over 75,000 ha (190,000 acres) of agrarian area in eastern and southeastern portions of Kirovohrad Oblast. The company owns the Oleksandriia Sugar Plant, transportation company "Hermes Trading", a couple of livestock farms including "Petrykivske moloko" (Petrykivka Milk), four grain elevators, a river terminal in Svitlovodsk.

Kuzmenko was the owner of FC UkrAhroKom Holovkivka that existed in 2008–2014. After acquiring PFC Oleksandriya from Mykola Lavrenko in 2013, he merged both clubs under the name FC Oleksandriya in 2014.

Sporting positions
Preceded by Mykola Lavrenko	President of FC Oleksandriya; 2013–	Succeeded by incumbent
Preceded by new post	President of FC UkrAhroKom Holovkivka; 2008–2014	Succeeded by post disbanded
Government offices
Preceded by Oleksandr Petik	Governor of Kirovohrad Oblast; 2014–2019	Succeeded by Serhiy Kovalenko (acting)
