= Valeriy Koroviy =

Ukrainian politician (born 1964)

- Валерій Коровій
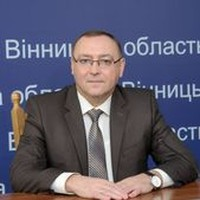

Governor of Vinnytsia Oblast
- In office 28 February 2015 – 18 September 2019
- Preceded by: Anatoliy Oliynyk
- Succeeded by: Vladyslav Skalsky

Deputy Mayor of Vinnytsia
- In office 14 July 2011 – 28 February 2015

First Deputy Governor of Vinnytsia Oblast
- In office 2006 – July 2010

Deputy Governor of Vinnytsia Oblast
- In office 2000–2006

Personal details
- Born: Valeriy Viktorovych Koroviy; 10 November 1964 (age 61) Trostianets, Vinnytsia Oblast, Ukrainian SSR, Soviet Union
- Children: 2

Valeriy Viktorovych Koroviy (Ukrainian: Валерій Вікторович Коровій; born on 10 November 1964) is a Ukrainian politician who previously served as the Governor of Vinnytsia Oblast from 28 February 2015 to 18 September 2019.

== Biography ==
Valeriy Koroviy was born on 10 November 1964, in Trostianets, Vinnytsia Oblast.

He graduated from Trostyanets Secondary School in 1982. After graduating from school he worked as a pupil of a turner in the Trostyanets District Association "Agricultural Technology". From 1982 to 1984, he was in regular service in the Soviet Army.

From 1984 to 1989, he studied at the Faculty of Economics of the Ukrainian Agricultural Academy. From 1990 to 1992, he worked as an economist of the collective farm "Fatherland", smt. Stryzhavka of Vinnitsa district and the head of planning and economic Vinnytsia inter-farm enterprise of granite products. In 1994, he graduated from the postgraduate study at the Institute of Economics of the Academy of Sciences of Ukraine, and defended the dissertation paper of the candidate of economic sciences ahead of time.

From 2000 to 2006, he was the Deputy Head of the Vinnytsia Oblast. At the end of 2006, he was promoted as the First Deputy Governor of Vinnytsia Oblast.

Appointed on 14 July 2011, he had worked as deputy mayor of Vinnytsia.

He is married with two sons.

=== Corruption Persecution ===
All-Ukrainian Movement Against Political Corruption "Under Control!" found that the Head of the Vinnytsia Regional State Administration, Valery Koroviy, signed an order dated June 29, 2014, in which three foreign-made cars were recognized as humanitarian aid for people with disabilities. One of the cars was Oleksandr Pron, director of the state enterprise "Vinnitsilisservis". The sum of possible losses is ₴1.2 million.
