= Oleh Synyutka =

Ukrainian politician

- Олег Синютка
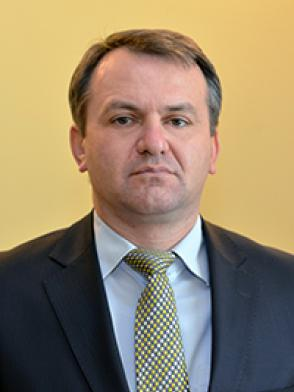

Member of the Verkhovna Rada
- Incumbent
- Assumed office 29 August 2019

Governor of Lviv Oblast
- In office 26 December 2014 – 11 June 2019
- Preceded by: Yuriy Turyansky (acting)
- Succeeded by: Markiyan Malsky

First Deputy Mayor of Lviv
- In office 2007–2014

Deputy Mayor of Ivano-Frankivsk
- In office 2002–2006

Personal details
- Born: Oleh Mykhaylovych Synyutka; 14 February 1970 (age 56) Kuropatnyky, Berezhany Raion, Ternopil Oblast, Ukraine, Soviet Union
- Party: European Solidarity
- Children: 2

Oleh Mykhaylovych Synyutka (Ukrainian: Олег Михайлович Синютка; born on 14 February 1970), is a Ukrainian politician. He is currently member of the Ukrainian parliament and he was Governor of Lviv Oblast from December 2014 until June 2019.

== Biography ==
=== Education ===
Oleh Synyutka was born on 14 February 1970. In 1987, Synyutka entered the first year of the History Department of the Ivano-Frankivsk State Pedagogical Institute. 1988–1989 he served in the Soviet army. In 1993, he graduated from the Precarpathian University as a history teacher.

In 1995, he received a diploma in economics and management at the University of Carpathian. From 1995 to 2001, he held the post of chairman of the JS "Massoyuz" (in Ivano-Frankivsk), then a year he was the director of the Ivano-Frankivsk AvtoZAZ-Daewoo LLC.

=== Career ===
From 2002 to 2006 he was deputy mayor of Ivano-Frankivsk. Since 2006, he became a deputy of the Ivano-Frankivsk regional council, in the same year he became director of the department of economic policy of the Lviv City Council. From 2007, he was promoted to a First Deputy Mayor of Lviv. On December 26, 2014, Oleh Synyutka was appointed as the Governor of Lviv Oblast.

In the July 2019 Ukrainian parliamentary election Synyutka was placed eight on the party list of European Solidarity. He was elected to parliament.

Synyutka was the defeated candidate of European Solidarity for the post of Mayor of Lviv in the 2020 Lviv local election of 25 October 2020. Incumbent Mayor Andriy Sadovyi was reelected in the second round of the Lviv mayoral election of 22 November 2020 with 62.25% of the vote (he had gained 40.09% in the first round). Runner up Synyutka got 37.75% of the vote (he had gained 31,1% in the first round).

== Family ==
He is married and has 2 children (daughter and son).
