= Oleh Honcharuk (politician) =

Ukrainian politician

- Олег Гончарук
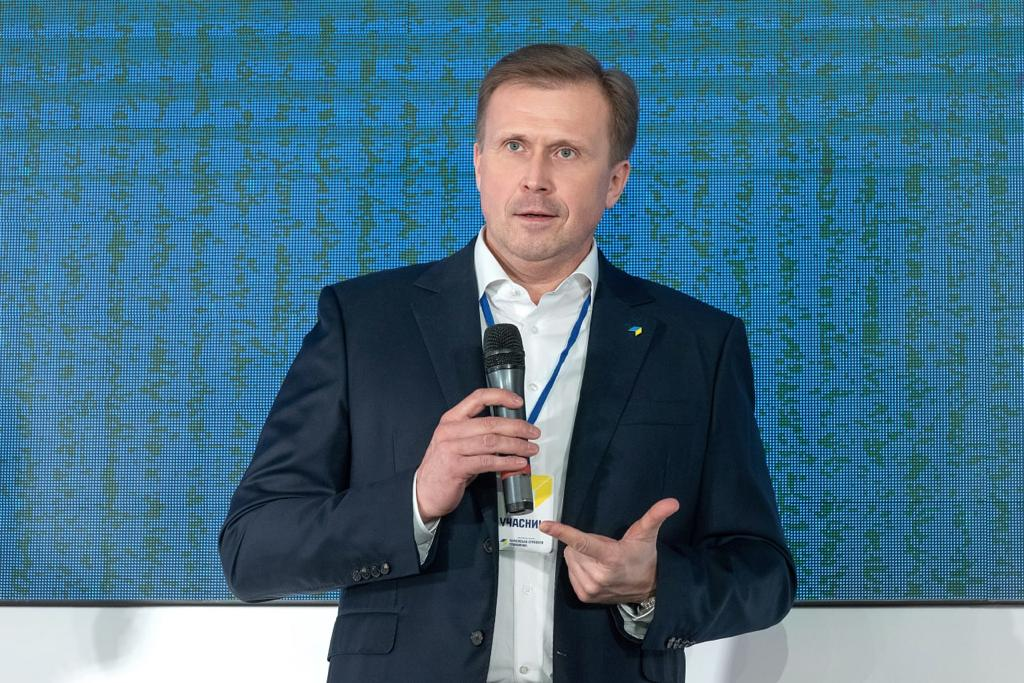
- Honcharuk in 2021

8th Governor of Ivano-Frankivsk Oblast
- In office 9 September 2014 – 11 June 2019
- President: Petro Poroshenko; Volodymyr Zelenskyy
- Preceded by: Andriy Trotsenko
- Succeeded by: Maria Savka (acting); Denys Shmyhal

Member of the Ivano-Frankivsk urban hromada
- Incumbent
- Assumed office 2010
- Constituency: 13th majoritarian district

Personal details
- Born: January 31, 1968 (age 58) Kalush, Ivano-Frankivsk Oblast, Ukrainian SSR, Soviet Union
- Party: Ukrainian Strategy of Groysman; European Solidarity; Front for Change
- Education: Ivano-Frankivsk National Technical University of Oil and Gas

Oleh Romanovych Honcharuk (Ukrainian: Олег Романович Гончарук; born 31 January 1968) is a Ukrainian politician and entrepreneur, who's currently serving as a member of the Ivano-Frankivsk urban hromada. Previously, he served as the Governor of Ivano-Frankivsk Oblast from September 2014 to June 2019.

A deputy chairman of the Ukrainian Strategy of Groysman party, Honcharuk was appointed governor by President Petro Poroshenko on 9 September 2014. He ended his governorship in June 2019.

== Biography ==
Honcharuk graduated from the Ivano-Frankivsk Institute of Oil and Gas, specializing in "Construction of Oil Pipelines", and is an engineer by occupation.

In 1997, he founded a bakery and confectionery company named the "Ligos" LLC, and became its CEO. "Ligos" is now known as one of the five largest of its kind in Ukraine. The enterprise created about 500 jobs.

Since June 2014, he has been the head of the Ivano-Frankivsk branch of the Ukrainian Union of Industrialists and Entrepreneurs.

== Political career ==
He is a deputy of the Ivano-Frankivsk urban hromada from its 13th majoritarian district, as a member of the Front for Change political faction.

On September 9, 2014, by decree of the President of Ukraine Petro Poroshenko, he was appointed head of the Ivano-Frankivsk Regional State Administration (RSA), replacing Andriy Trotsenko. On June 11, 2019, Honcharuk was replaced by Maria Savka as acting governor.

On September 24, 2014, Oleh Honcharuk announced that he and his family no longer had any connection with the company "Ligos". In doing so, he complied with the requirements of Ukrainian legislation, which prohibits combining of an elected position of his with doing business.

Since June 1, 2019, Honcharuk has been the associate professor of the Department of Public Administration and Management of the Institute of Humanitarian Training and Public Administration of the Ivano-Frankivsk National Technical University of Oil and Gas.

In September 2021, after the signing of a memorandum of cooperation between the Community Platform and the Ukrainian Strategy of Groysman political party, and Honcharuk therefore became deputy chairman of the party.

== Personal life ==
Honcharuk is married, and has a daughter.
