= Governor of Vinnytsia Oblast =

Chief executive of Vinnytsia Oblast, Ukraine

- Seal of Vinnytsia Oblast

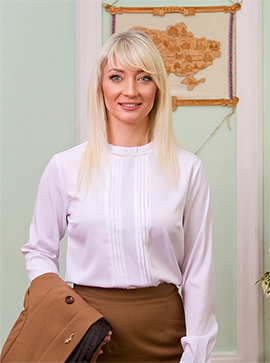
- Incumbent; Nataliya Zabolotna since 8 January 2026
- Residence: Vinnytsia
- Term length: Four years
- Inaugural holder: Mykola Didyk; 1992–1994
- Formation: 1992 as Presidential representative
- Website: Government of Vinnytsia Oblast

The governor of Vinnytsia Oblast is the head of executive branch for the Vinnytsia Oblast.

The office of governor is an appointed position, with officeholders being appointed by the president of Ukraine, on recommendation from the prime minister of Ukraine, to serve four-year term.

The governor's official residence is in Vinnytsia. Since 19 June 2020 the governor is Serhiy Borzov.

== Governors ==
- Mykola Didyk (1992–1994, as the Presidential representative)
- Mykola Melnyk (1995–1996, as the Governor)
- Anatoliy Matviyenko (1996–1998, acting to 1996)
- Mykola Chumak (1998–1999)
- Dmytro Dvorkis (1999)
- Yuriy Ivanov (1999–2002)
- Viktor Kotsemyr (2002–2004)
- Hryhoriy Kaletnik (2004–2005)
- Mykhailo Matiyenko (2005, acting)
- Oleksandr Dombrovskyi (2005–2010)
- Volodymyr Demishkan (2010)
- Valeriy Koroviy (2010, acting)
- Mykola Dzhyha (2010–2012)
- Ivan Movchan (2012–2014, acting to 2012)
- Anatoliy Oliynyk (2014–2015)
- Valeriy Koroviy (2015–2019)
- Vladyslav Skalsky (2019–2020)
- Serhiy Borzov (2020–2024)
- Nataliya Zabolotna (2026-incumbent, acting: 2024-2026)

== Sources ==
- World Statesmen.org
