= Nahirianka =

Nahirianka Нагірянка
- Village
- Location within Ukraine Location within Ternopil Oblast
- Coordinates: 48°55′51″N 25°44′03″E
- Country: Ukraine
- Oblast: Ternopil Oblast
- District: Chortkiv Raion
- Area: 1,480 km^{2} (570 sq mi)
- Elevation: 318 m (1,043 ft)
- Population: 1,785
  - Density: 1.21/km^{2} (3.12/sq mi)
- Website: селище Нагірянка райцентр Чортків ^{(Ukrainian)}

Nahirianka (Ukrainian: Нагі́рянка) is a village or rural settlements (Ukrainian: селище, selysche) located in the Chortkiv Raion (district) of the Ternopil Oblast (province of Western Ukraine). It hosts the administration of Nahirianka rural hromada, one of the hromadas of Ukraine. The area of the village totals is 14,80 km^{2} and the population of the village is about 2122 people. Local government is administered by Nahirianska village council.

== Geography ==
The village is located on the banks of the Cherkaska River (right tributary of the Seret, Dniester River basin). That is along the Highway M19 (Ukraine) ( M 19) at a distance of 15 kilometres (9.3 mi) from the district center of Chortkiv, 92 kilometres (57 mi) from the regional center Ternopil and 34 kilometres (21 mi) from the town of Zalishchyky.

The village is joined by the khutory of Hai Nahoryanski and Marylivka.

== History and Attractions ==
The village is known from the 16th century, although the official founding date of the village is 1785. Initially, the village was known as the suburbs of the village Yahilnytsya. But archeological sights and remains of settlements of Trypillian culture (3rd millennium BC) and Culture of ancient Rus (11th-13th centuries) it was found near the village Nahirianka.
Nahirianka village contains one of the most powerful castles, Hetman S. Lyantskoronsky – Yahilnytsia Castle, 1630. There are an architectural monuments of local importance of the Ternopil region, Chortkiv district in the village. It is a wooden Church of St. Michael 1672–1782 years (N-691/1) and wooden bell tower 18th century (N-481/2).

== People ==
- Oleh Barna (1967–2023), Ukrainian public and political figure, Member of Verkhovna Rada of Ukraine, participant of the Russian-Ukrainian war
- Stepan Barna (born 1979), Ukrainian political activist and former member of the Verkhovna Rada of Ukraine
- Volodymyr Dobrianskyi (born 1966), Ukrainian scientist, archaeologist, historian, speleologist, and researcher of antiquities, fortifications and toponymy
- Roman Varkhol (born 1957), Ukrainian poet, teacher
- Taras Vashchuk (born 1947), Ukrainian artist
- Volodymyr Prokopyk, Ukrainian composer, arranger, former leader of the Smerichka vocal group
- Mariia Protseviat (born 1936), Ukrainian singer, conductor, teacher, public figure
- Uliana Shkromiuk (born 1952), Ukrainian master, ceramist

President of Ukraine Leonid Kuchma and public and political activist Viacheslav Chornovil visited Nahirianka.
