= Ruined Church, Monastyrok =

Ukrainian church in Monastyrok, Ukraine

Church of the Transfiguration
- Церква Преображення Господнього
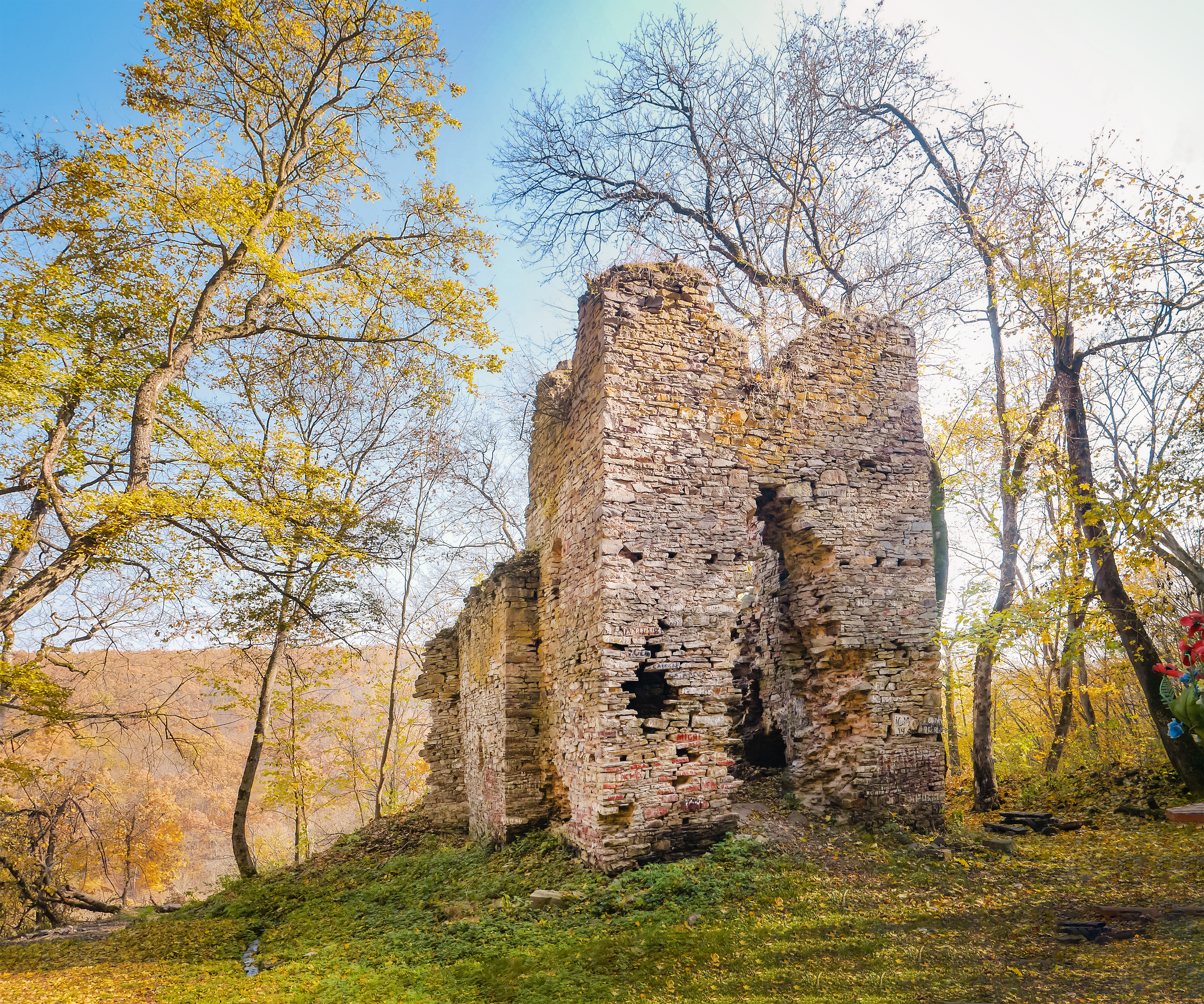

- Location within Ternopil Oblast

Location
- Location: near the villages of Zhyznomyr and Buchach, Ternopil Oblast
- Coordinates: 49°01′59″N 25°24′02″E

Architecture
- Completed: 15th–16th centuries

Immovable Monument of National Significance of Ukraine
- Official name: Церква в урочищі Монастирок (руїни) (мур.) (Church in Monastyrok Tract (ruins) (stone))
- Type: Architecture
- Reference no.: 190079

Church of the Transfiguration in Monastyrok (Ukrainian: Церква Преображення Господнього в урочищі Монастирок) is a defensive religious building constructed in approximately the 15th–16th centuries and is an architectural monument of national importance. It belongs to the triconch type of churches. The remains of the temple are located in a forest 2 km south of Buchach (Ternopil Oblast), on a hill overlooking the Strypa River. The remains of an ancient monastery have been preserved here, which is why the area itself was named the Monastyrok tract.

== Church planning ==
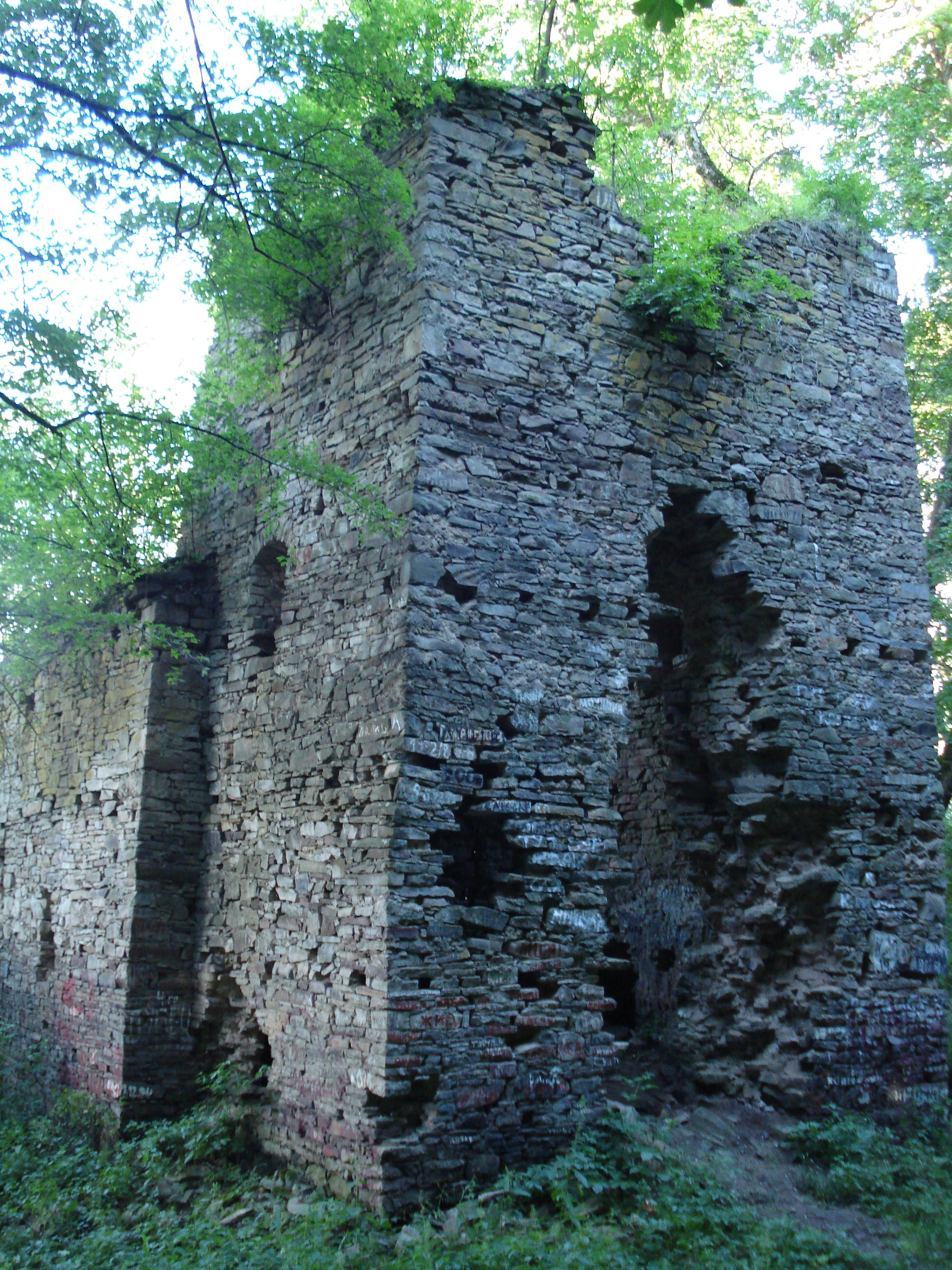

The incorrect configuration of the fence remains, which served as a fortification, indicates that there were other buildings on the monastery grounds. The gate was located in the northwestern corner of the monastery courtyard.

The church belongs to the type of three-conch defensive temples with a high bell tower. It is brick-built, with walls 1.7-1.8 m thick. The nave, measuring approximately 5.5×9 m, opens onto an eastern apse of almost equal width and significantly smaller southern and northern (partially destroyed) exedras. The southern exedra has a tall round window, while the apse has no windows. On the south side of the nave, there are only two window openings up to 3 m high, with semicircular lintels. The north wall of the nave, which faces the monastery gate, has no windows. This is obviously due to defensive needs. The ceilings above the nave, apse, and exedras have not been preserved.

The main defensive function was performed by the tower, which rose about 6 m above the nave. Its total height was about 15 m (without the roof). The entrance to the temple was located in the western wall of the tower; above it were two battle tiers, each with one arrow slit on each side of the tower. The tiers were connected by a central staircase. Since the embrasures were built at a considerable height and were structurally designed only for firing at distant approaches to the temple, it can be assumed that above the second tier of embrasures there was a third battle tier in the form of a cantilevered wooden gallery for the defense of the surrounding area.

The layout of the church is very similar to that of St. Nicholas Church in Buchach.

== History ==
The history of the temple is unknown, and its dating to the 16th century, which is widespread in scientific sources, is not substantiated. An analysis of the architectural and structural features of the building and its archaic typology suggest that the church already existed in the 15th century. Undoubtedly, only thorough research can reveal the history of this unique monument, but such research has obviously not yet been carried out.

Of the historical events related to the monastery on Mount Fedir, Aleksander Czołowski mentions only the Turkish attack of 1672, when the temple was burned down. According to Hryhorii Lohvyn, it was then that the vault above the nave and apse was destroyed.

The monastery was built between 1600 and 1606 with financial support mainly from Maria Mohylanka, daughter of Moldavian ruler Ieremia Movilă (who sent money before she was married to Stefan Potocki), and her husband Stefan Potocki, who provided the land (i.e., the plot of land), a garden, and a forest).

== Future ==
The study of the church and monastery and the development of a restoration project were the subject of a thesis by Liudmyla Tur, a student at Lviv Polytechnic (supervised by Dr. Mykola Bevz and B. Mykhailiuk).

== Bibliography ==
- Бевз М. Оборонна твердиня над Стрипою / Чин Святого Василія Великого // Галицька брама. — Львів, 1999. — № 49—50 (січень—лютий). — 32 с. — С. 28—29.
- Бучач і Бучаччина. Історично-мемуарний збірник / ред. колегія Михайло Островерха та інші. — Ню Йорк — Лондон — Париж — Сидней — Торонто : НТШ, Український архів, 1972. — Т. XXVII. — 944 с. — іл.
- Вітоль Я. ЦЕРКВА в урочищі Монастирок під Бучачем // Оборонні сакральні споруди Західного Поділля. — С. 162—163.
- (in Ukrainian) Гуцал П., Жизномирський монастир Преображення Господнього // Ternopil Encyclopedic Dictionary: in 4 v. / editorial board: H. Yavorskyi and other, Ternopil: "Zbruch", 2004, V. 1: А—Й, S. 575. — ISBN 966-528-197-6.
- Залеський О. Крукова гора / Бучач і Бучаччина. Історично-мемуарний збірник / ред. колегія Михайло Островерха та інші. — Ню Йорк — Лондон — Париж — Сидней — Торонто : НТШ, Український архів, 1972. — Т. XXVII. — С. 480.
- Нариси історії архітектури Української РСР. — К., 1957. — Т. І. — С. 92.
- Czolowski A., Janusz B. Przeszłość i zabytki województwa tanopolskiego. — Tarnopol, 1926. — S. 153.
