= Oleh Barna =

Ukrainian human rights activist and politician (1967–2023)

- Олег Барна
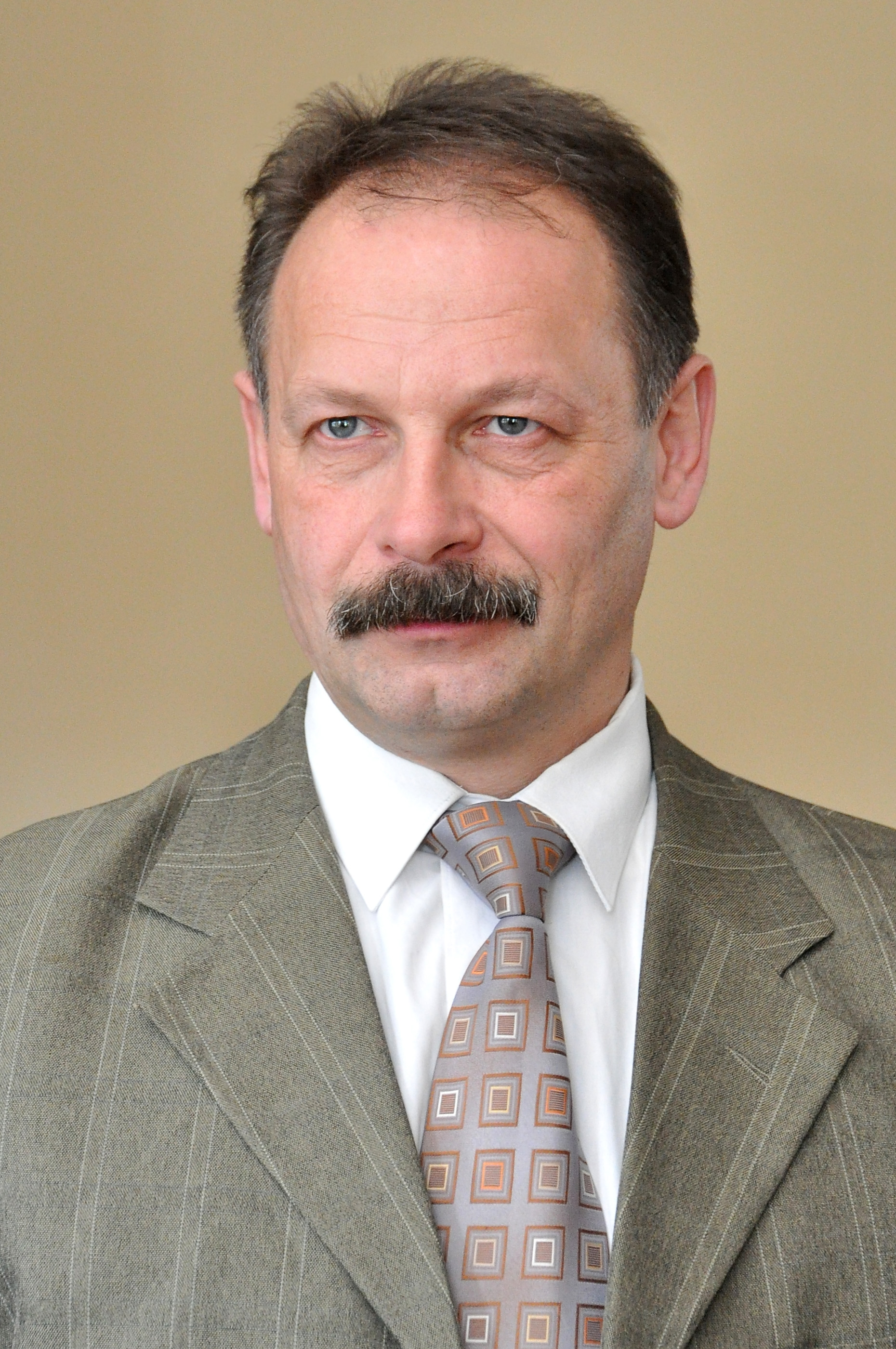
- Barna in 2015

People's Deputy of Ukraine
- In office 27 November 2014 – 29 August 2019
- Preceded by: Ivan Stoiko
- Succeeded by: Volodymyr Hevko
- Constituency: Ternopil Oblast, No. 167

Mayor of Nahirianka
- In office 2002–2010
- Preceded by: Igor Pyren
- Succeeded by: Petro Holovatskyi

Personal details
- Born: 18 April 1967 Nahirianka, Ternopil Oblast, Ukrainian SSR, Soviet Union
- Died: 17 April 2023 (aged 55) Pavlivka, Donetsk Oblast, Ukraine
- Cause of death: Killed in action
- Party: Petro Poroshenko Bloc
- Relatives: Stepan Barna (brother)

Military service
- Allegiance: Soviet Union; Ukraine
- Branch/service: Soviet Army; Ukrainian Ground Forces
- Years of service: 1985–1987 (Soviet Union); 2014; 2022–2023 (Ukraine)
- Unit: 128th Guards Mountain Brigade (2014); 68th Jager Brigade (2022–2023)
- Battles/wars: Russo-Ukrainian War; War in Donbas; Russian invasion of Ukraine; Battle of Vuhledar †
- Awards: Order for Courage

Oleh Stepanovych Barna (Ukrainian: Олег Степанович Барна; 18 April 1967 – 17 April 2023) was a Ukrainian human rights activist and politician who served as a People's Deputy of Ukraine from 2014 to 2019. Barna fought during the Russian invasion of Ukraine and was killed in action on 17 April 2023. Honorary Citizen of Ternopil (2023, posthumously).

== Biography ==
Barna served in the Soviet Army from 1985 to 1987.

In October 1990 Barna, as a 5th-year student, took part in the hunger strikes of the Revolution on Granite.

From 1991 to 2014 Barna worked as a teacher of mathematics, physics, computer science, and pre-service training in Rydoduby and Bilobozhnytsia in Ternopil Oblast's Chortkiv Raion. In 2000, he was an organizer of the Ukraine without Kuchma protests. In the same year he took part in by-elections for the Verkhovna Rada (Ukraine's national parliament) as a candidate in the 167th electoral district in Ternopil Oblast, but he withdrew his candidacy in favour of Serhii Zhyzhko. (Zhyzhko was a candidate of Congress of Ukrainian Nationalists and failed to get elected to parliament in this election.)

Barna was Mayor of Nahirianka from 2002 to 2010.

In the second round of 2004 Ukrainian presidential election Barna worked in the electoral headquarters of Viktor Yushchenko in Kharkiv Oblast's Chuhuiv Raion. In the 2002 Ukrainian parliamentary election Barna headed the electoral headquarters for Yulia Tymoshenko Bloc in Chuhuiv Raion.

Barna took part in the 2013–2014 Euromaidan protests and was seriously hurt during clashes on 18 February 2014 at Mariinskyi Park.

In the 2014 Ukrainian parliamentary election Barna was a candidate for the Petro Poroshenko Bloc in electoral district 167. He was elected with 27.51% of the total votes cast in the district a Deputy of Ukraine of the 8th convocation. In the 2019 Ukrainian parliamentary election Barna failed to get reelected in district 167 for European Solidarity. He lost to independent candidate Volodymyr Hevko who won the district with 22.21%.

In July 2014 he volunteered to fight in the war in Donbas with the 128th Guards Mountain Brigade.

In 2015 Barna publicly fought with the then Prime Minister Arseniy Yatsenyuk in parliament. On 11 December 2015, he at first presented Yatsenyuk with flowers and then tried to carry him out of his rostrum.

On 17 April 2023, former President of Ukraine Petro Poroshenko reported that Barna was killed in combat during the Russian invasion of Ukraine. On the first day of the 24 February 2022 full-scale invasion Barna signed up as a volunteer at the front. On 18 April a military spokesman confirmed Barna's death, but on the same day Poroshenko and Barna's brother, the Ukrainian politician Stepan Barna, stated that his brigade had not confirmed his death. The brothers fought together in the war, in the 68th Jager Brigade. A spokesman for the brigade stated the body of Barna had not yet been evacuated from the battlefield, so he was not officially declared dead. The spokesman did state: "everything points to the fact that he died." On 19 April 2023 his death was officially confirmed. Barna died during the Battle of Vuhledar in the village of Pavlivka. According to Poroshenko, Barna died of a bullet wound in the neck.

== Awards ==
- Order for Courage, 3rd class (24 August 2023, posthumously)
