= Governor of Ternopil Oblast =

Chief executive of Ternopil Oblast, Ukraine

- Seal of Ternopil Oblast

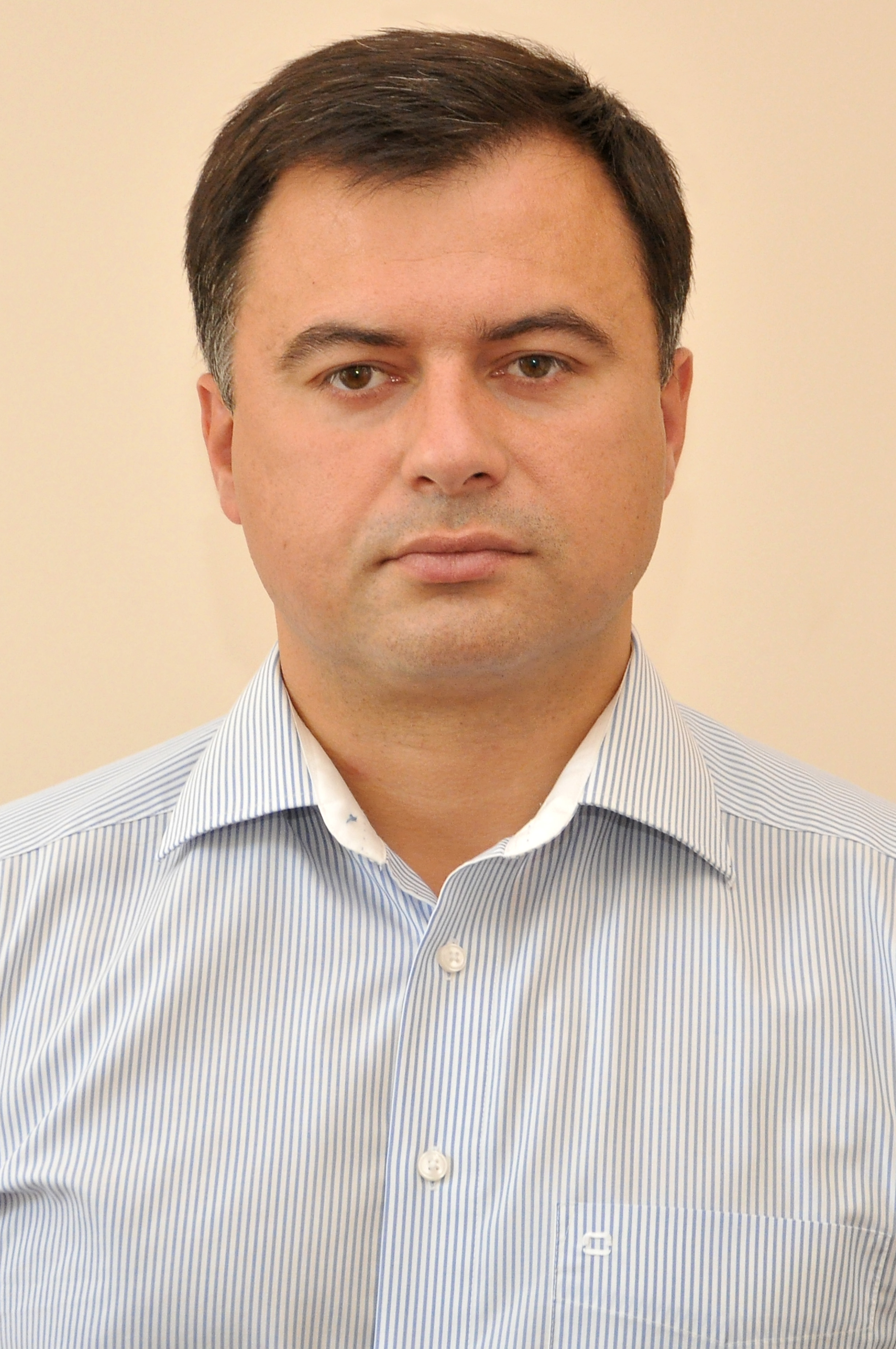
- Incumbent; Taras Pastukh since 12 January 2026
- Residence: Ternopil
- Term length: Four years
- Inaugural holder: Roman Hromiak; 1992–1994
- Formation: 1992 as Presidential representative
- Website: Government of Ternopil Oblast

The governor of Ternopil Oblast is the head of executive branch for the Ternopil Oblast.

The office of governor is an appointed position, with officeholders being appointed by the president of Ukraine, on recommendation from the prime minister of Ukraine, to serve a four-year term.

The official residence for the governor is located in Ternopil.

== Governors ==
- Roman Hromiak (1992–1994, as the Presidential representative)
- Borys Kosenko (1994 as the Presidential representative)
- Borys Kosenko (1995–1996, as the Governor)
- Bohdan Boyko (1996–1998)
- Vasyl Vovk (1998–1999)
- Vasyl Kolomyichuk (1999–2002, acting to 1999)
- Ivan Kurnytskyi (2002–2004)
- Mykhailo Tsymbaliuk (2004–2005)
- Ivan Stoiko (2005–2007)
- Yuriy Chyzhmar (2007–2010, acting to 2007)
- Yaroslav Sukhyi (2010)
- Mykhailo Tsymbaliuk (2010)
- Valentyn Khoptyan (2010–2014)
- Oleh Syrotyuk (2014)
- Ivan Krysak (2014–2015, acting)
- Stepan Barna (2015–2019)
- Ivan Krysak (2019, acting)
- Ihor Sopel (2019–2020)
- Volodymyr Trush (2020-2023)
- Volodymyr Vazhynskyy (acting, 2023-2024)
- Vyacheslav Nehoda (2024-2026)
- Taras Pastukh (since 2026)

== Sources ==
- World Statesmen.org
