= Saint Nicholas Church, Buchach =

Ukrainian church in Buchach, Ukraine

Saint Nicholas Church
- Церква Святого Миколая
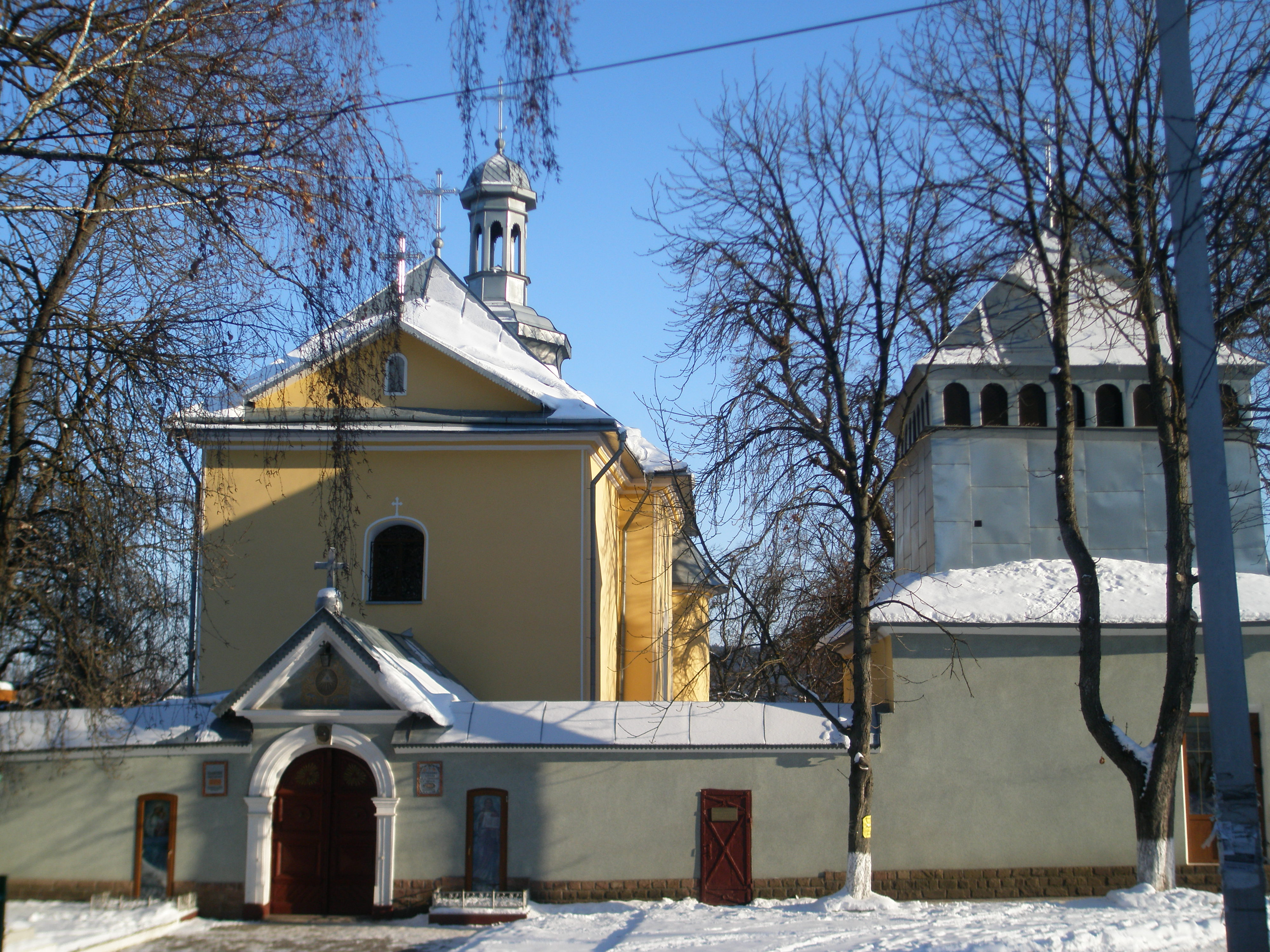

- Location within Ternopil Oblast

Location
- Location: Buchach
- Coordinates: 49°03′49″N 25°23′37″E

Architecture
- Completed: around 1610

Immovable Monument of National Significance of Ukraine
- Official name: Миколаївська церква та дзвіниця (мур.) (St Nicholas Church and bell tower (stone))
- Type: Architecture
- Reference no.: 190077

Saint Nicholas Church (Ukrainian: Церква Святого Миколая) is the oldest preserved stone church in Buchach, Ternopil Oblast. It was built as an Orthodox church. Currently, it is a church of the Orthodox Church of Ukraine, formerly a church of the Ukrainian Autocephalous Orthodox Church, and even earlier a deanery church of the Galician Greek Catholic Metropolis of the Ukrainian Greek Catholic Church. It is located at 8 St. Nicholas Street. It is an architectural monument of national significance.

== History ==
According to legend, the church was built on the site of the church of John the Baptist, which housed his icon, revered by the faithful.

The current brick church of St. Nicholas was built in the early 17th century on the site of a wooden church. It was built and consecrated in 1610. The founders of the church were Maria Mohylanka and her husband, Podillia Governor Stefan Potocki, as confirmed by the image of their marital coat of arms (Potocki-Mohyl) above the church door. St. Nicholas Church was the first completely stone church in the city. In the documents of that time, it was called "urban". On 23 July 1700, the heir of Buchach, Stefan Aleksander Potocki, issued a privilege, in particular, regarding church property, exemption from taxes, and the appointment of Dmytro Zhelenskyi as parish administrator.

During the renovation of the iconostasis, the then parish priest, Mykhailo Kurylo, drew attention to the icon of John the Baptist, which was located in the bell tower. Later, it was taken for restoration by Wojciech Dzieduszycki, and in the 1920s it was displayed at one of the exhibitions in Lviv.

On 29 June 2008, an old original photograph (photo size 23x29 cm, cardboard plate size 27.6x34 cm) was exhibited at the International Collectors' Fair in Lviv, glued to a cardboard plate, depicting the iconostasis of St. Nicholas Church in Buchach.

For about 400 years, St. Nicholas Church has been a spiritual center for the people of Buchach. The church was initially used for Orthodox services and is still used today by the Orthodox Church, as well as by the Ukrainian Greek Catholic Church for a long time (for example, the current bell was installed in the 1920s, when Denys Nestaiko served as parish priest in Buchach).

== Description ==
The building has features of the Byzantine-Romanesque style, is small in size, of the so-called triconch type (the predecessor of this type of church was the Byzantine-Kievan Rus' type of three-nave church), built on the model of Bukovinian (Moldavian) churches. The temple is three-part, with two small harmonious-shaped conches, rectangular in plan with an extension (between the entrance gate and the church door) — a wooden narthex from 1862) in front and a tower in the center. During the defense of Buchach from the Turks and Tatars, the windows of the church served as loopholes. According to Hryhorii Lohvyn, there used to be a defensive tower above the narthex (vestibule), similar to the defensive church of the monastery near Zhyznomyr. The altar has the shape of a slightly elongated rectangle, and the eastern wall has a faceted top.

The churchyard is sloping and surrounded by a massive stone wall. In 1780 and 1855, major floods destroyed the wall, which was then rebuilt.

Until the 1990s, one of the temple's greatest treasures was the 16th-century icon of the Virgin Mary on the eastern wall of the altar. It was brought to Buchach by Maria Mohylanka, who prayed to it as her patron saint and donated it to the church as an elder sister. The icon was probably originally located in the castle chapel (or was there until the mid-18th century). Mikołaj Bazyli Potocki paid for the manufacture of silver robes and a crown for the icon, as well as a silver lamp. The current location of the icon is unknown.

The walls of the temple are painted with images of saints. An unusual feature is the depiction of angels on the steps in the altar apse.

== Iconostasis ==
The main value of the church is its unique iconostasis — a synthesis of small architectural forms, wood carving, and painting. It is richly decorated with carvings and gilding characteristic of the Baroque style. The iconostasis is a remarkable monument of Ukrainian visual art from the first half of the 18th century, installed with the assistance of Mikołaj Bazyli Potocki. It is believed that it was installed in place of another or that the current one has old local icons of the Annunciation, Jesus Christ, the Virgin Mary Odigitria, and Saint Nicholas. Experts believe that it was created by masters of the Zhovkva school of woodcarving and painting (according to Volodymyr Ovsiichuk, painter Vasyl Petranovych with his students in 1744-1749, Zhovkva, now Lviv Oblast). Another version suggests that the iconostasis was installed in the church in 1743.

It is made in the Baroque style. Its main features are architectonic structures and decorative carvings. The dynamics of the architectural masses are emphasized by a significant increase in the height of the central part of the iconostasis, which gives it a pyramidal composition; the intense plasticity of the decorative frame is conveyed by solid carvings, dominated by grapevines and serrated acanthus leaves. The picturesque paintings of the iconostasis are stylistically related to its decor. The iconostasis has an original design, dynamically filling the rectangular space of the altar with a semicircular finish with four rows of icons: local, festive, apostolic, and prophetic (the latter disappeared after the "restoration" in 1980). The center of the composition is the royal gates consisting of two halves, above which is the icon "The Last Supper".

Volodymyr Vuitsyk suggested that the author of the carvings for the iconostasis could have been the Zhovkva master Ihnatii Stobenskyi.

== Famous people ==
=== Priests ===
Greek Catholics:

- Dymytrii Zilynskyi – dean, consecrated the Holy Trinity church in Zolotyi Potik
- Mykhailo Zarytskyi
- Stepan Khodynskyi
- Stepan Klymentii Salevych, 1773, Dean of Buchach
- Antin Barushevych (?—1832) in particular, in 1832
- Ivan Kropyvnytskyi (1803—1861, ordained 1828) — in 1833–1861 1858
- Ivan Martynets — in 1861–1863, administrator
- Mykhail Kurylovych
- E. Vesolovskyi (1866-1910) in 1903–1905
- Teodor Teliakovskyi; Councilor of the city of Buchach since April 1897
- Denys Nestaiko
- Petro Melnychuk

Orthodox Christians:

- Anatolii Sydorenko
- Ivan Pylypyshyn (later Archbishop Varlaam of Bukovina)
- Taras Druchok

Assistant Priest:

- Oleksii Studynskyi (1838—1839)
- Illia Luchakovskyi (1844—1846)
- Petro Korchynskyi (1846—1847)
- Markell Popel (1850—1851)
- Kyrylo Tserkevych (1853—1854)
- Dominik Stebletskyi (1854—1855)
- Yulian Levytskyi (1855—1856)
- Porfyrii Nestaiko (great-grandfather of writer Vsevolod Nestayko; 1856—1857)
- Leopold Zaleskyi (1857—1858),
- Antin Huzar (1858—1860)
- Avdii Sheparovych (1860—1862)
- Ilarii Lukashevych (1862—1866)
- Roman Zarytskyi (1866—1868)
- Yevhen Aleksevych (1870—1871)
- Omelian Bilynskyi (1871—1872)
- Yulian Levytskyi (1847—6.3.1900) Zhyznomyr 1872—1878),
- Ilarii Shushkovskyi (1878—1879)
- Mykola Halushchynskyi (1879—1880)
- Oleksii Zaiachkivskyi (1880—1881)
- Leontii Kopertynskyi (1881—1882)
- Hryhorii Rybchak (1884—1889).

== Church in works of art ==
- Antin Maliutsa. Церква св. Миколая в Бучачі. — 1943.

== Gallery ==
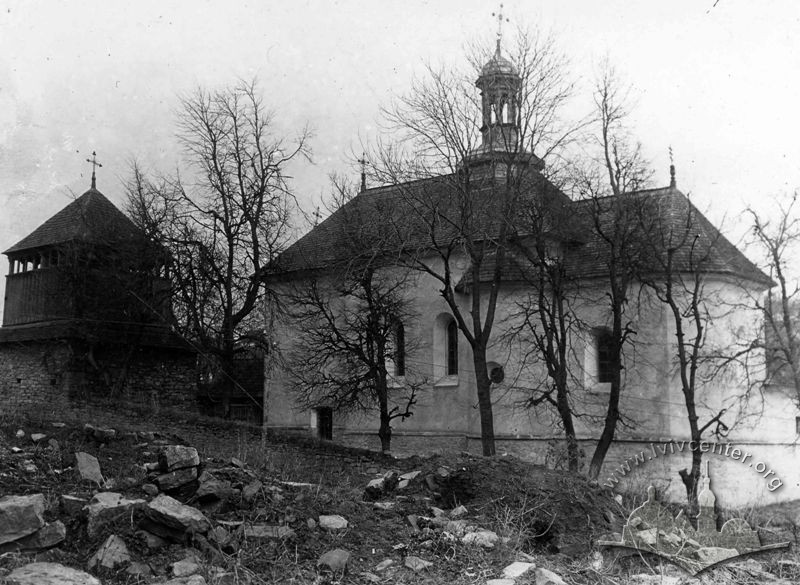

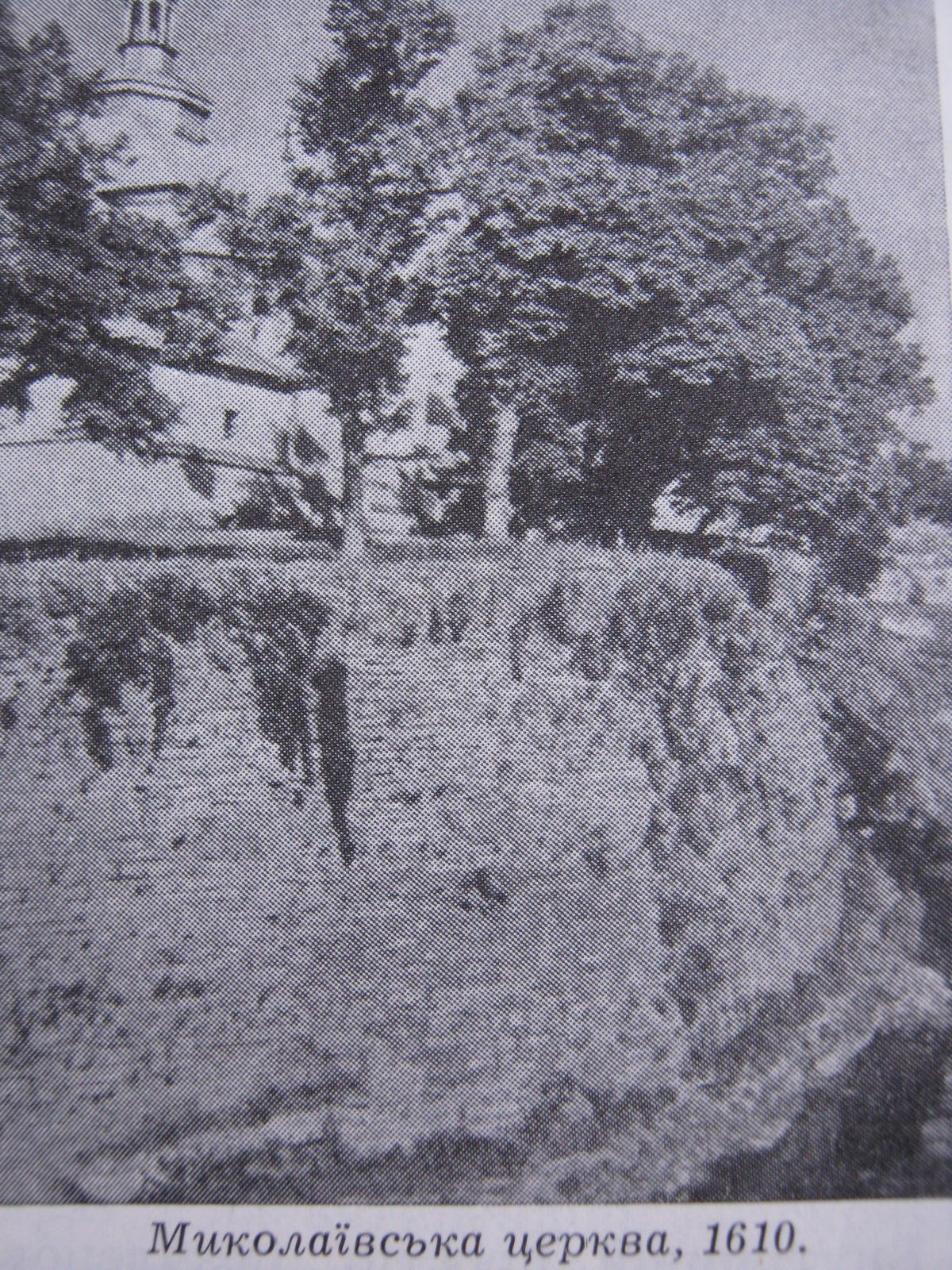
Wall near the church (early 20th century)

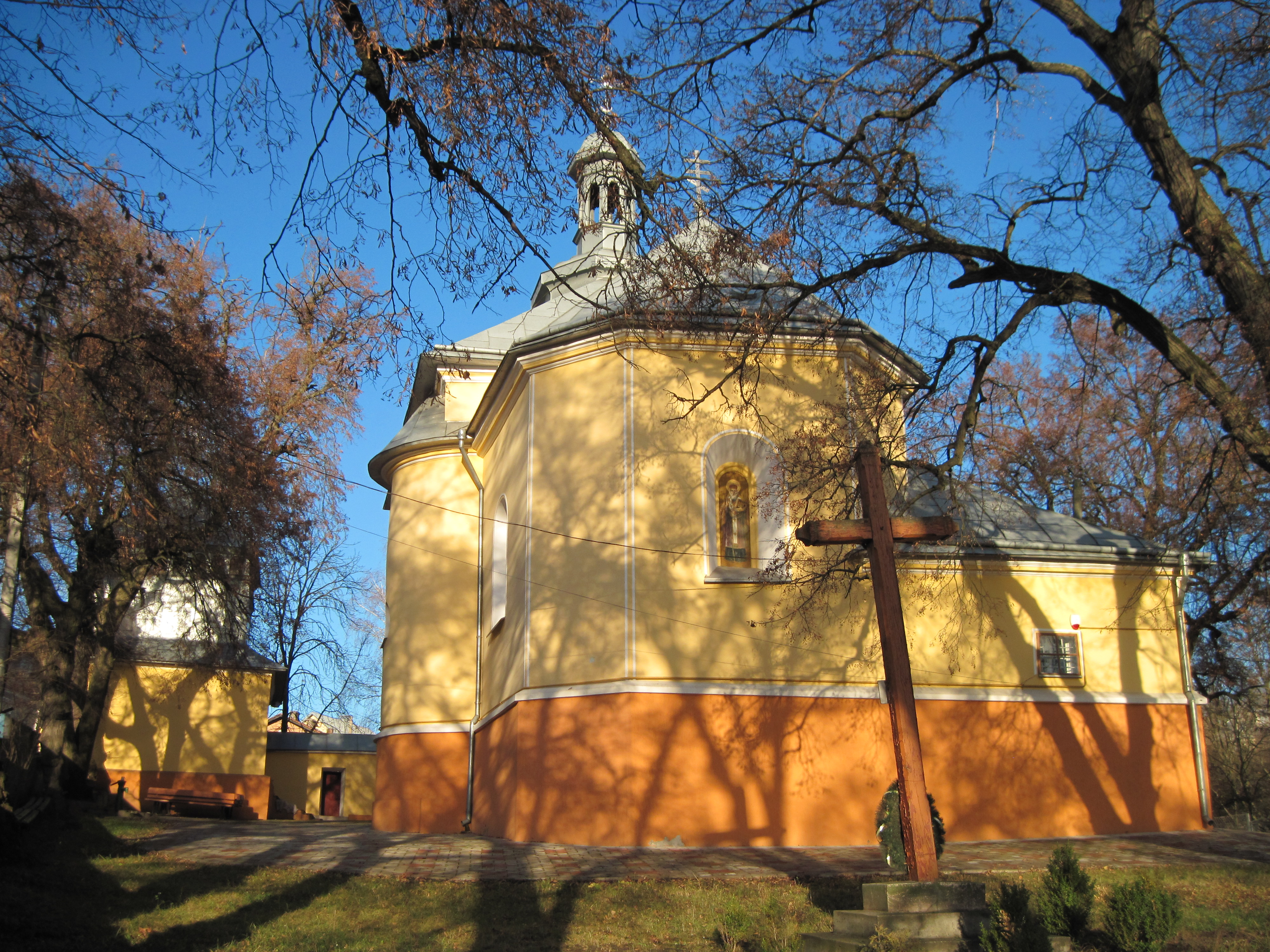
View from the apse

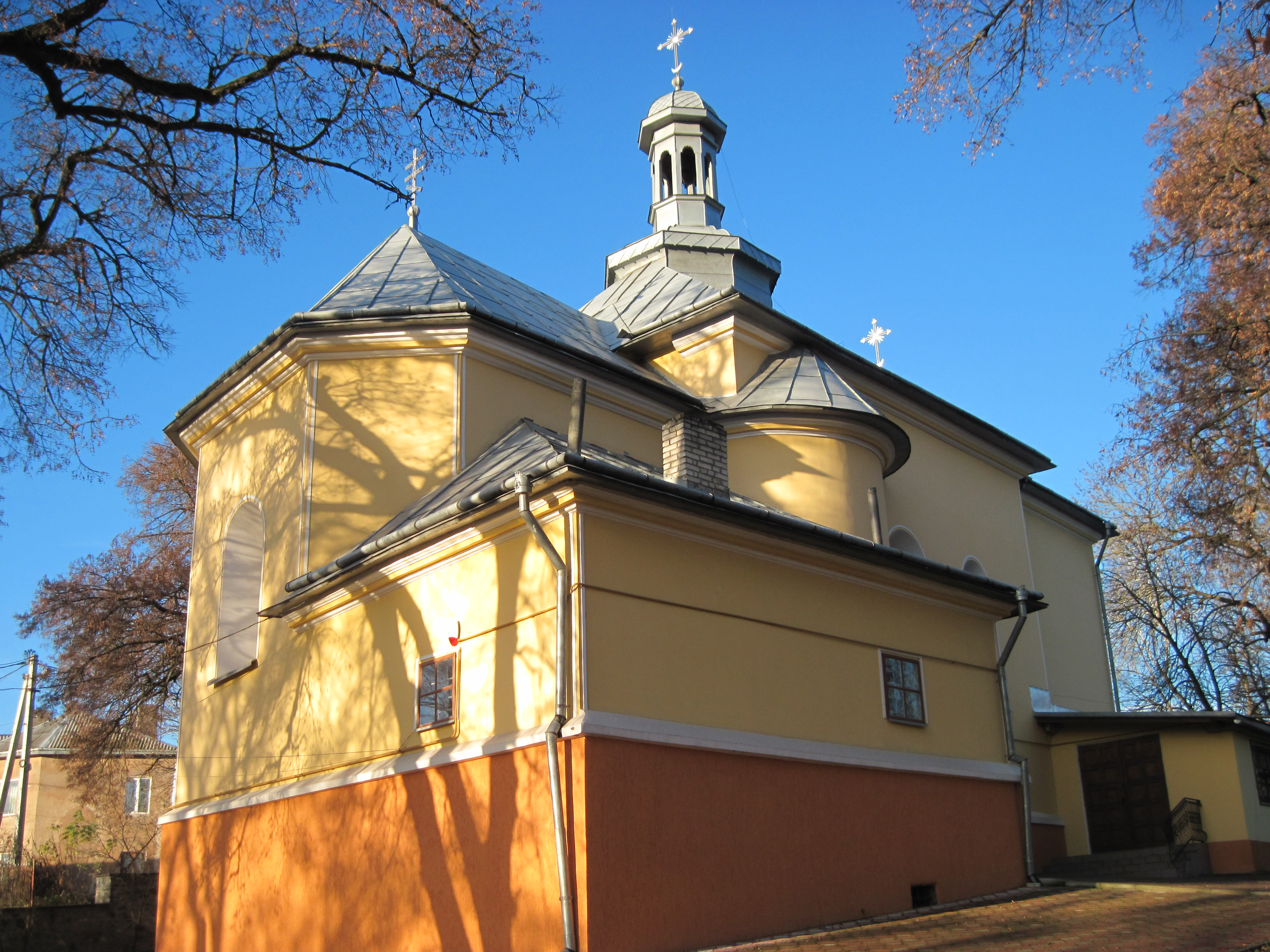
View from the southeast

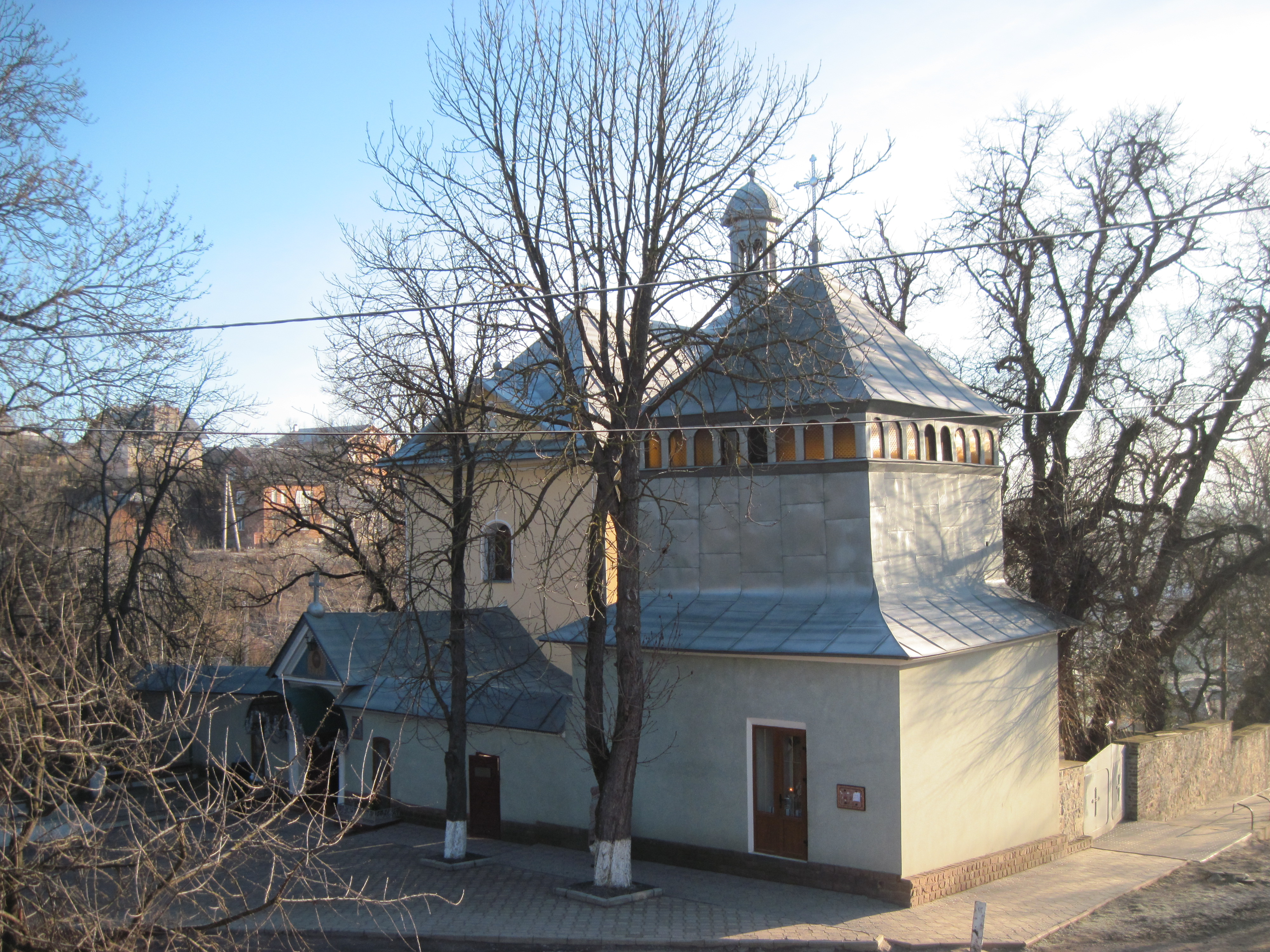
In February 2015

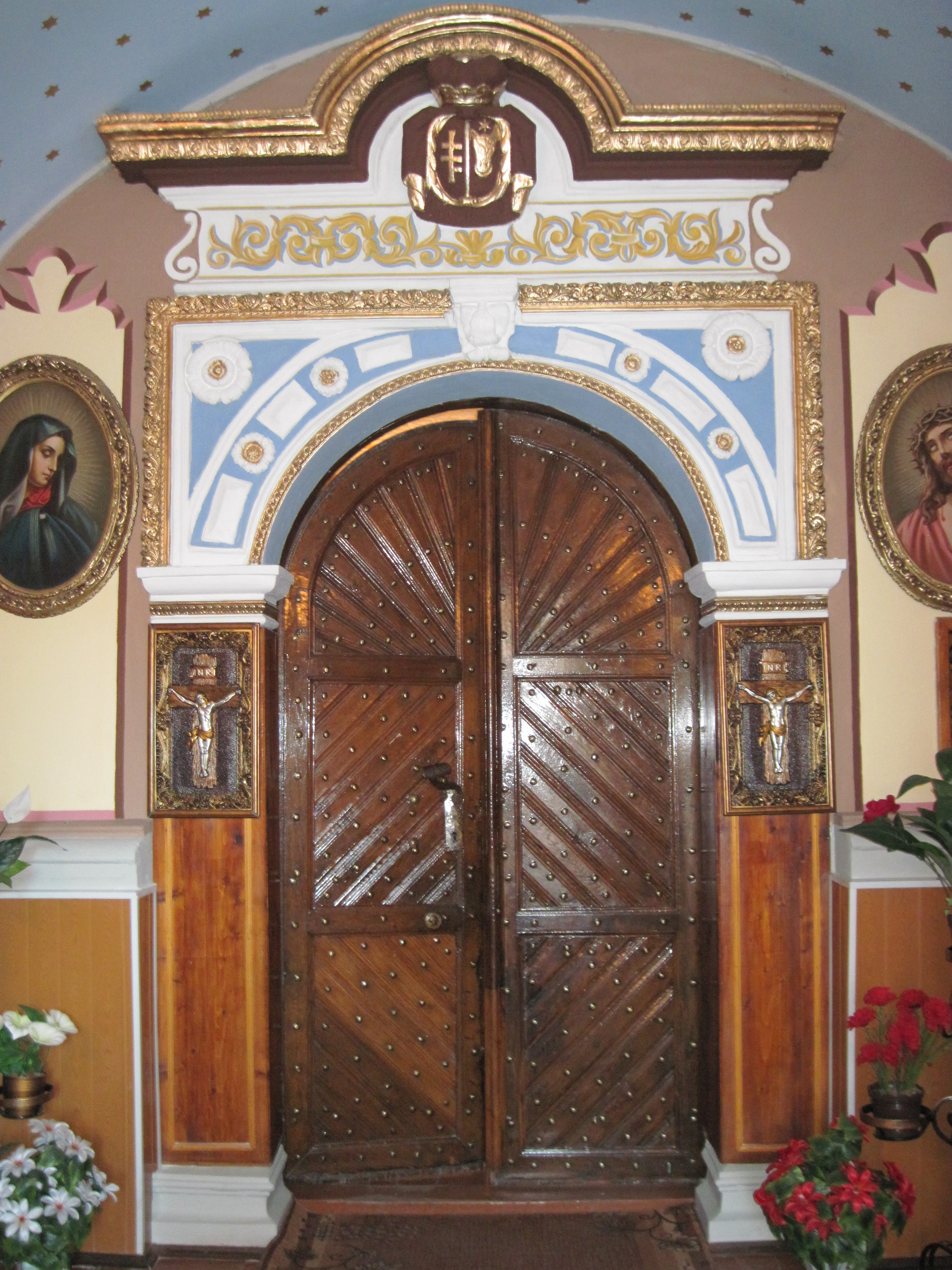
The old entrance to the church, coats of arms of the founders

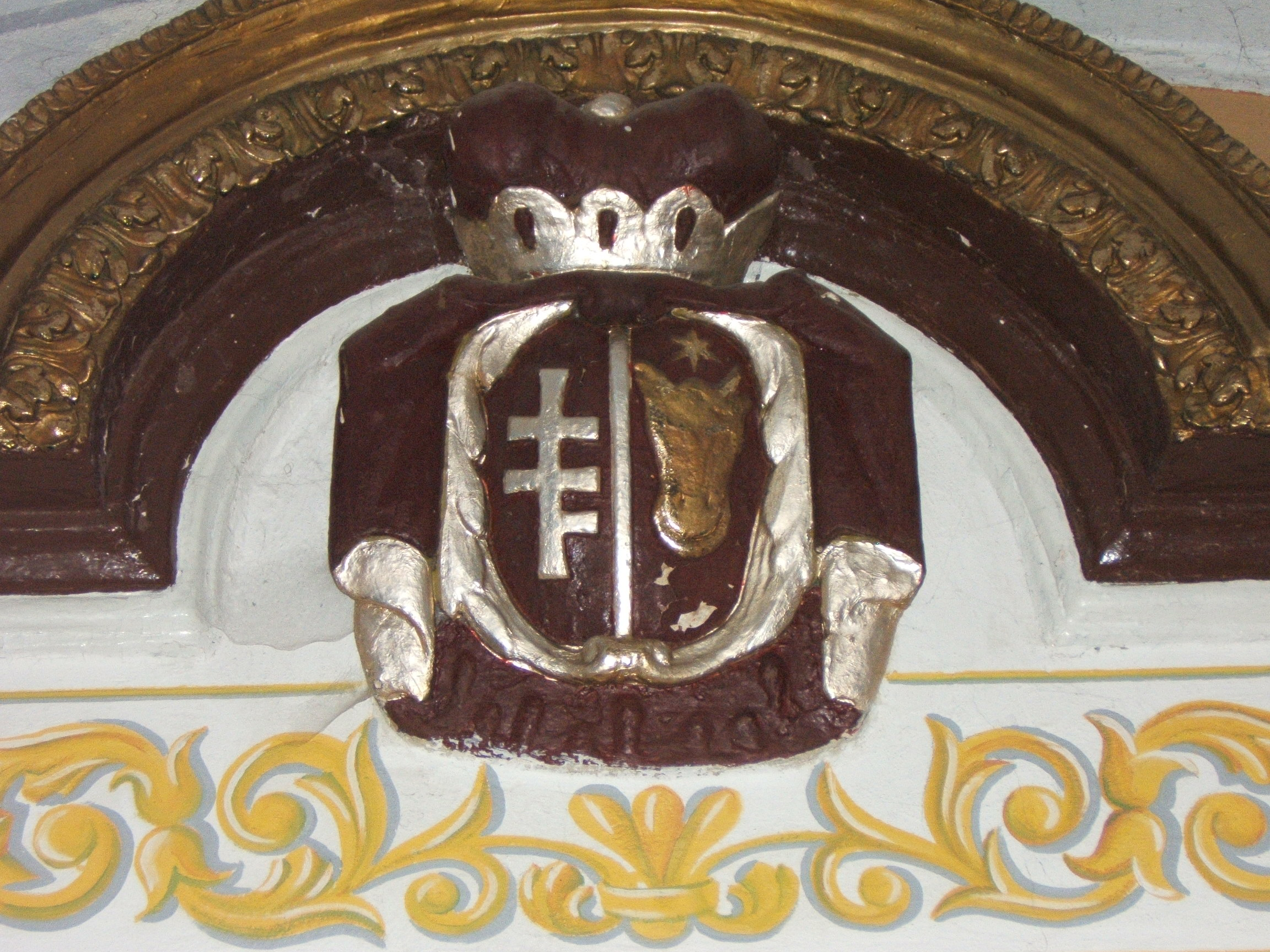
Coat of arms of Maria Mohylanka and Mykola Potocki

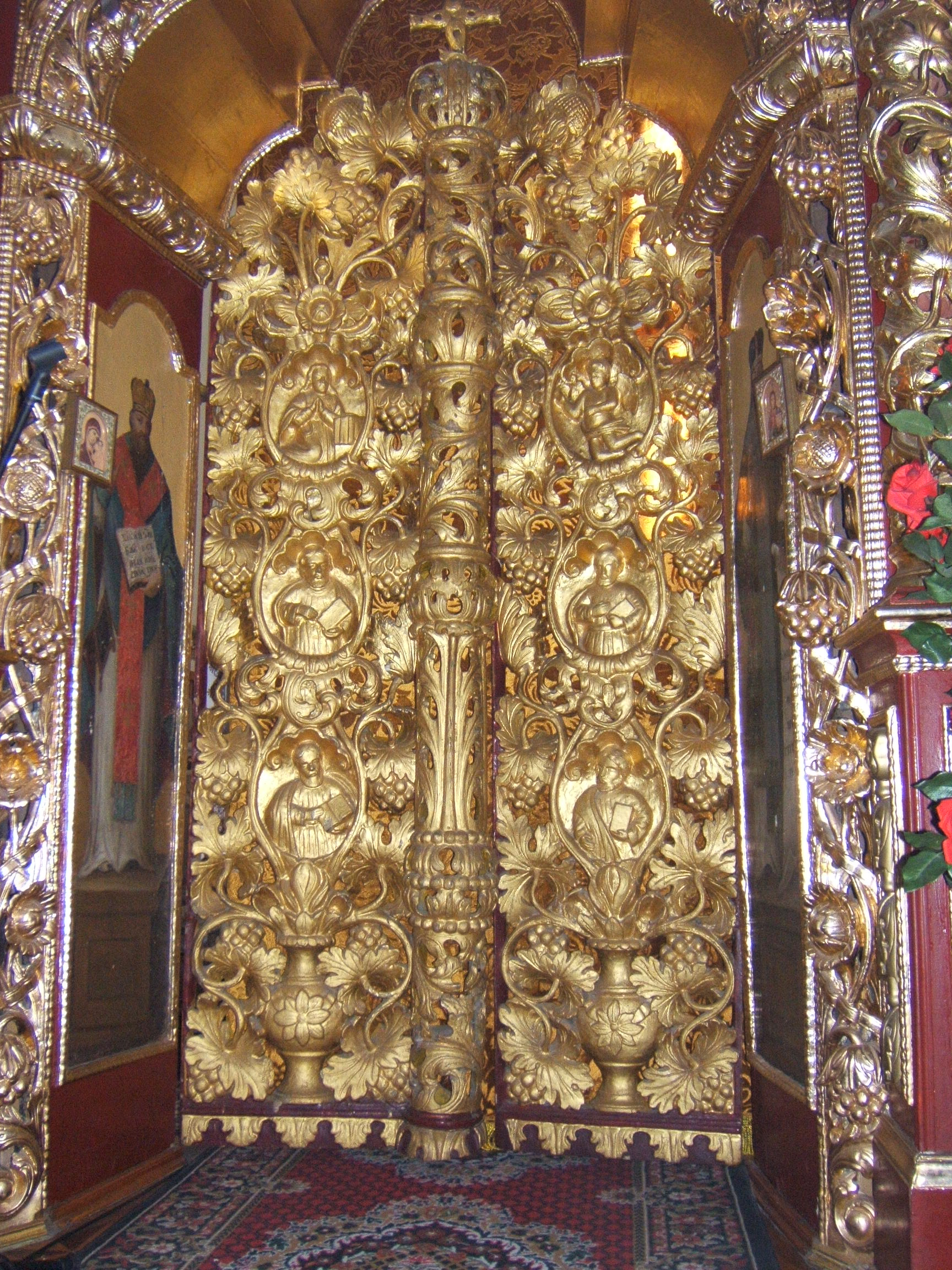
The Tsar's Gate

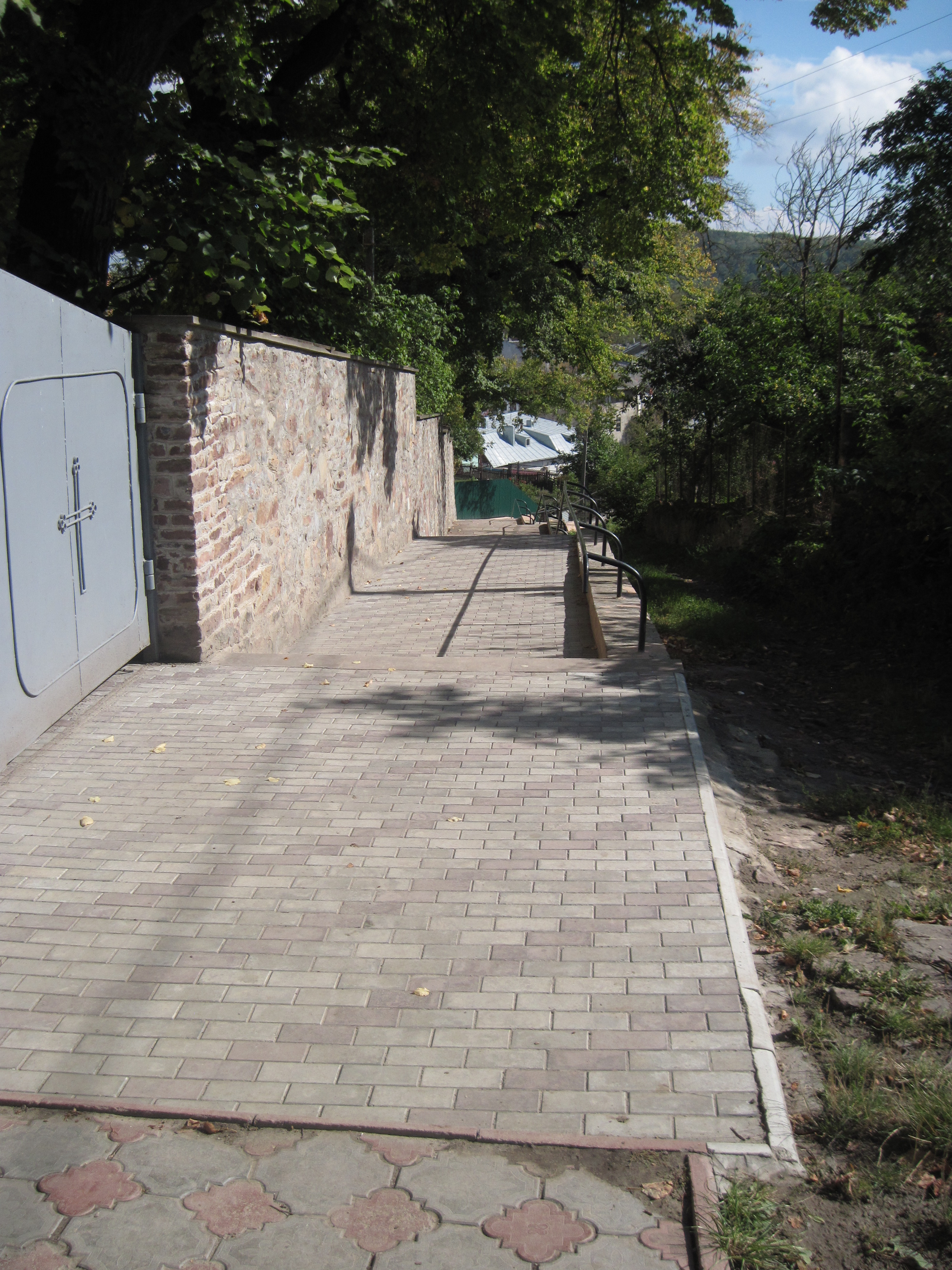
Path near St. Nicholas Church, 2014

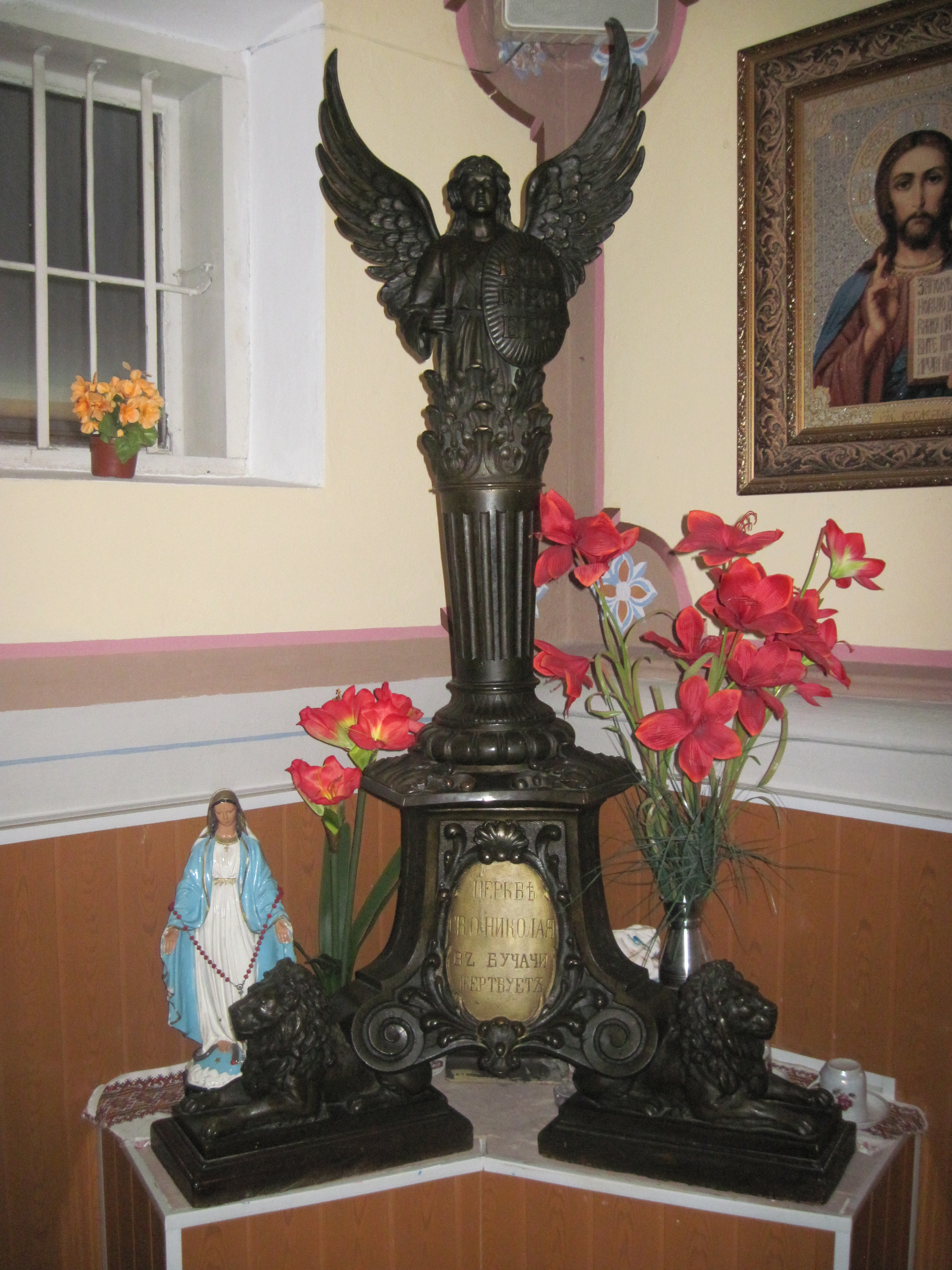

== Bibliography ==
- Бучач і Бучаччина. Історично-мемуарний збірник / ред. колегія Михайло Островерха та інші. — Ню Йорк — Лондон — Париж — Сидней — Торонто : НТШ, Український архів, 1972. — Т. XXVII. — 944 с. — іл.
- Вітоль Я. Церква в урочищі Монастирок під Бучачем // Оборонні сакральні споруди Західного Поділля. — С. 162—163.
- Вітоль Я. Церква святого Миколая в м. Бучачі // Оборонні сакральні споруди Західного Поділля. — С. 164—165.
- Вуйцик В.. Краснопущанський іконостас Василя Петрановича // Записки Наукового товариства імені Шевченка. — Том CCXXXVI. Праці Комісії образотворчого та ужиткового мистецтва. — Львів, 1998. — С. 413—416.
- Козак М. (автор тексту), Бубній П. (літредактор). Бучач. Фотопутівник. — Тернопіль : ВАТ «Збруч», 2010. — 64 с., іл.
- Островський Ю., Пелех Ю.Нові матеріали до історії досліджень та реставрації Богородчанського іконостаса у XIX ст. (Атрибуція нововіднайдених фотографій іконостаса Воздвиженської церкви із Скиту Манявського 1698—1705 рр. у церкві м. Богородчан) / Національний науково-дослідний реставраційний центр. Львівський філіал. Бюлетень. Інформаційний випуск. — Львів — № 1 (10), 2008. — С. 212—216.
- Станкевич М. Бучач та околиці // Львів: СКІМ, 2010. — 256 с., іл. — ISBN 966-95709-0-4.
- Чень Л. Церква Св. Миколая — перлина Бучача. — Львів, 2010. — 28 с.
- Barącz S. Pamiątki buczackie // Lwów: Drukarnia Gazety narodowej, 1882. — 168 s.
- Blazejowskyj D. Historical Šematism of the Archeparchy of L'viv (1832—1944). — Kyiv : Publishing house «KM Akademia», 2004. — P. I. — 1103 p. — ISBN 978-966-518-225-2.
- Blazejowskyj D. Historical Šematism of the Archeparchy of L'viv (1832—1944). — Kyiv : Publishing house «KM Akademia», 2004. — P. II. — 570 p. — ISBN 978-966-518-225-2.
- Czyż A. S., Gutowski B. Cmentarz miejski w Buczaczu. — Warszawa : drukarnia «Franczak» (Bydgoszcz), 2009. — Zeszyt 3. — 208 s., 118 il. — (Zabytki kultury polskiej poza granicami kraju. Seria C.). — ISBN 978-83-60976-45-6.
- Odnaleziona — utracona. O ikonie uskrzydlonego św. Jana Chrzciciela z Buczacza. — 6 s.
