= Mykhailo Tsymbaliuk =

Ukrainian police officer, professor, and politician

- Михайло Цимбалюк
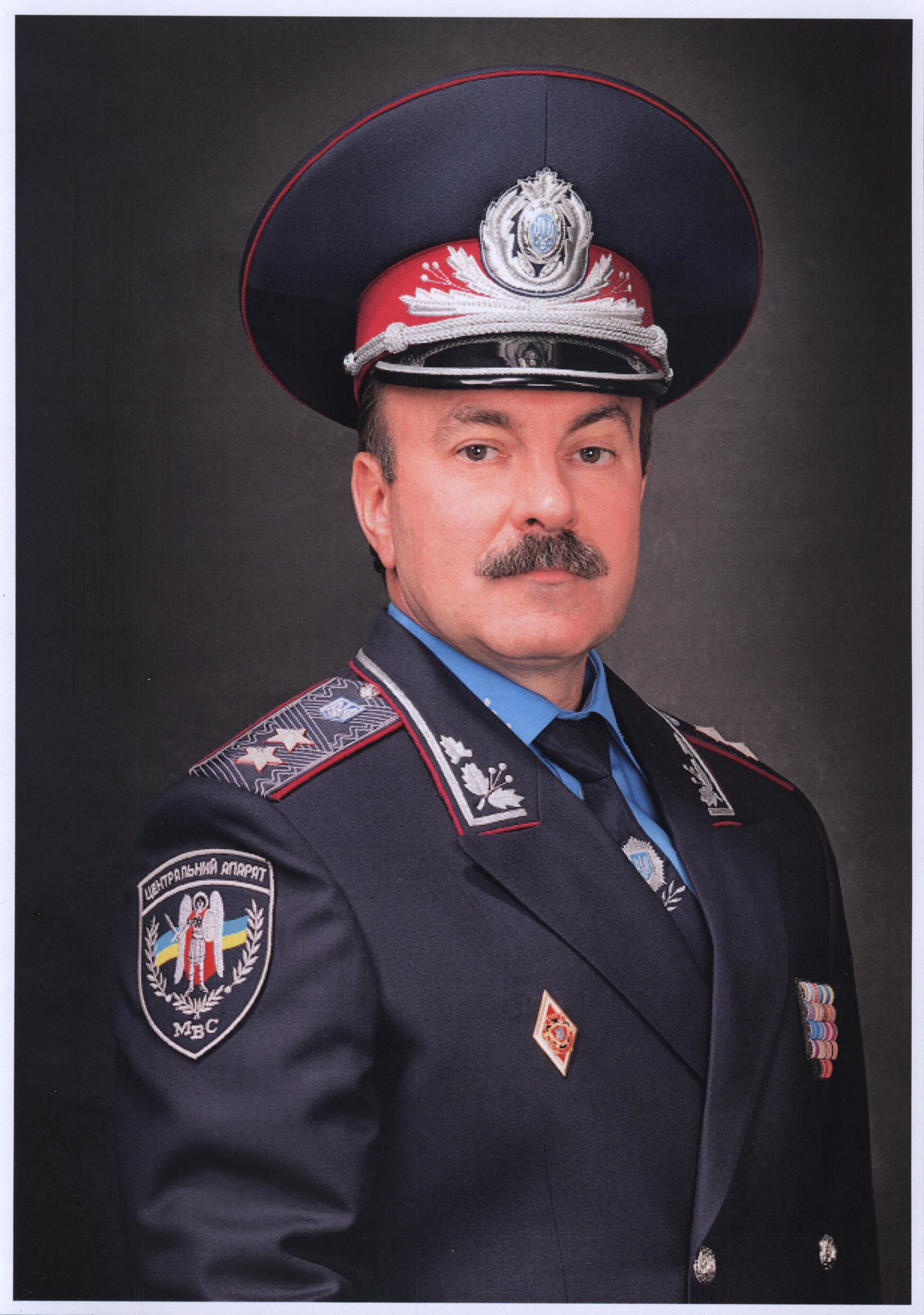

People's Deputy of Ukraine
- Incumbent
- Assumed office 29 August 2019
- Constituency: Batkivshchyna, No. 15

Governor of Lviv Oblast
- In office 21 December 2010 – 2 November 2011
- Preceded by: Vasyl Horbal
- Succeeded by: Mykhailo Kostiuk

Governor of Ternopil Oblast
- In office 16 June 2010 – 21 December 2010
- Preceded by: Yaroslav Sukhyi
- Succeeded by: Valentyn Khoptian
- In office 17 July 2004 – 19 January 2005
- Preceded by: Ivan Kurnytsky
- Succeeded by: Ivan Stoiko

Personal details
- Born: 21 November 1964 (age 61) Pasichna, Ukrainian SSR, Soviet Union (now Ukraine)
- Party: Batkivshchyna

Military service
- Allegiance: Soviet Union; Ukraine
- Branch/service: Main Directorate for Traffic Safety; Militsiya
- Years of service: 1988–2010
- Rank: Lieutenant general

Mykhailo Mykhailovych Tsymbaliuk (Ukrainian: Михайло Михайлович Цимбалюк; born 21 November 1964) is a Ukrainian retired lieutenant general of the Militsiya, politician, and legal professor currently serving as a People's Deputy of Ukraine on the party list of Batkivshchyna since 29 August 2019. Previously, he served as Governor of Lviv Oblast from 21 December 2010 to 2 November 2011 and as Governor of Ternopil Oblast on two occasions, first from 17 July 2004 to 19 January 2005 and later from 16 June to 21 December 2010.

== Early life and police career ==
Mykhailo Mykhailovych Tsymbaliuk was born on 21 November 1964 in the village of Pasichna, in what was then part of the Soviet Union. In 1988, he graduated from the Ternopil State Pedagogical Institute (now the Ternopil Volodymyr Hnatiuk National Pedagogical University) with a degree in physical education, and began working at a youth sports school in the village of Koshliaky. Around the same time, Tsymbaliuk began working at the Main Directorate for Traffic Safety (GAI) within the Ministry of Internal Affairs of the Ukrainian SSR. He worked in the GAI, as well as its successor agency, the State Automobile Inspection Service (DAI), until 2001.

From 2002 to 2004, Tsymbaliuk was head of the Ministry of Internal Affairs in Rivne Oblast. From 2005 to 2007, he was head of the department of the criminal police for juvenile offenders within the Ministry of Internal Affairs, before serving as head of the Ministry of Internal Affairs in Lviv Oblast from 2007 to 2010 and in Poltava Oblast in 2010.

== Legal career ==
Tsymbaliuk graduated from the Interregional Academy of Personnel Management in 1998 and from the National Academy of Internal Affairs in 2001, on both occasions with a degree in law. An Honoured Lawyer of Ukraine, Tsymbaliuk has published multiple scientific works and monographs, and is a professor of the Department of Legal Philosophy at the National Academy of Internal Affairs.

== Political career ==
On 17 July 2004, Tsymbaliuk was appointed by President Leonid Kuchma as Governor of Ternopil Oblast. He served in the position until 19 January 2005, at which point he resigned. He was again appointed as Governor of Ternopil Oblast by President Viktor Yanukovych on 16 June 2010, and served until 21 December 2010, when he was appointed as Governor of Lviv Oblast. On 2 November 2011, he resigned from this position.

=== People's Deputy of Ukraine ===
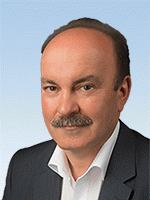
Official portrait of Tsymbaliuk as a People's Deputy of Ukraine

In the 2019 Ukrainian parliamentary election, Tsymbaliuk was successfully elected as a People's Deputy of Ukraine, placed 15th on Batkivshchyna's party list. He is first deputy chairman of the Verkhovna Rada Committee on Social Policy and Protection of Veterans' Rights.
