= Ivan Stoiko =

Ukrainian activist and politician

- Іван Стойко
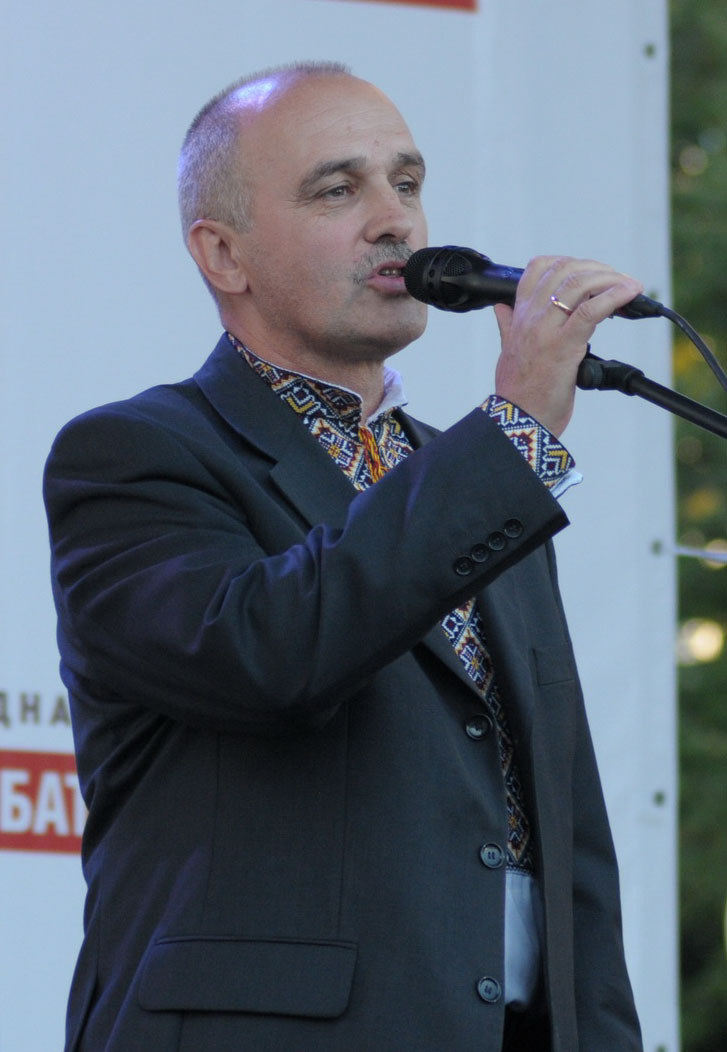

Governor of Ternopil Oblast
- In office 2005–2007
- Preceded by: Mykhailo Tsymbaliuk
- Succeeded by: Yuriy Chyzhmar

Personal details
- Born: 27 April 1961 (age 65) Zhyznomyr, Ukrainian SSR, Soviet Union (now Ukraine)
- Party: People's Movement of Ukraine
- Education: Syktyvkar State University; Ternopil National Economic University

Ivan Mykhailovych Stoiko (Ukrainian: Іван Михайлович Стойко; born 27 April 1961) is a Ukrainian political activist and politician. He served as Governor of Ternopil Oblast from 2005 to 2007, and served multiple terms as a People's Deputy of Ukraine in the Verkhovna Rada from 2002 to 2005, and from 2007 to 2014. He was variously a member of the parties of the People's Movement of Ukraine, Bloc of Viktor Yushchenko "Our Ukraine", and Batkivshchyna.

== Early life ==
Stoiko was born on 27 April 1961 in Zhyznomyr, which was then part of the Ukrainian SSR in the Soviet Union. After graduation, he worked as an excavator operator in Ternopil, before completing his mandatory military service in the Soviet Armed Forces and then working for the Obyachev forestry enterprise within the Komi ASSR of the Russian SFSR. He then returned to school to achieve higher education, and in 1993 graduated from Syktyvkar State University with a specialty in being a teacher of history. Upon his graduation, however, he worked as commercial director of the company "Synkroimpuls" in Drohobych. From 1997 to 2000 he was Dean of Faculty and Head of the Academic Department at the Ternopil Commercial Institute. He later obtain a master's degree in economics from Ternopil National Economic University in 2004.

== Political career ==
In 2000, he became head of the Ternopil branch for the People's Movement of Ukraine, which he did for a year. Afterwords, he worked as Deputy Head of the Department for Press and Information of the Ternopil Oblast State Administration from 2001 to 2005. He ran for election during the 2002 Ukrainian parliamentary election for district no. 166 for Bloc of Viktor Yushchenko "Our Ukraine", which he won. He served as a People's Deputy until he resigned his mandate to become Governor of Ternopil Oblast in July 2005. He was then promoted to Governor of Ternopil Oblast in 2005, which he served as until 2007. Following his term as governor, he became briefly a member of the National Security and Defense Council of Ukraine and a deputy of the Ternopil Oblast Council. He then returned to being a People's Deputy when he was elected during the 2007 Ukrainian parliamentary election for Our Ukraine, where he served as Chair of the Subcommittee on Information Security. He was re-elected in 2012, this time for district no. 167, from Batkivshchyna, serving until 2014.
