= Yaroslav Sukhyi =

Ukrainian activist and politician

- Ярослав Сухий
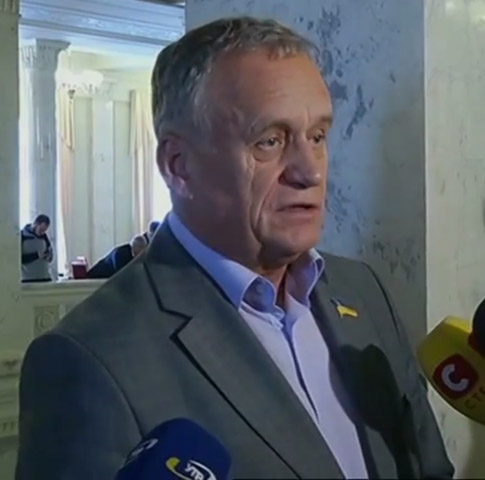

Governor of Ternopil Oblast
- In office 2010–2010
- Preceded by: Yuriy Chyzhmar
- Succeeded by: Mykhailo Tsymbaliuk

Personal details
- Born: 26 March 1951 (age 75) Oryshkivtsi, Ukrainian SSR, Soviet Union
- Party: Communist Party of Ukraine; Labour Ukraine; Party of Regions
- Education: Lviv University; Zaporizhzhya National Technical University

Yaroslav Mykhailovych Sukhyi (Ukrainian: Ярослав Михайлович Сухий; born 26 March 1951) is a Ukrainian communist activist and politician and former member of the Verkhovna Rada.

== Early life ==
Sukhyi was born on 26 March 1951 in Oryshkivtsi, which was then part of the Ukrainian SSR in the Soviet Union. In 1974, he graduated from the University of Lviv within the Faculty of History, and qualified for the specialty of teacher of history and social sciences. After graduation, he completed his compulsory military service with the Soviet Armed Forces, and then became an instructor for the Komsomol of Ternopil until 1978. After leaving the Komsomol, he became a lecturer at the Ternopiil Finance and Economics Institute until 1988, eventually becoming party committee secretary there too. From 1988 up until the dissolution of the Soviet Union, he worked his way up through the Ternopil Regional Communist Party Committee, eventually becoming secretary of it, and was First Secretary of the Ternopil City Communist Party Committee.

After the USSR's collapse, he worked for the Ukrainian industrial giant Motor Sich in Alushta within Crimea, until he transferred to the city of Zaporizhzhia to become Deputy General Director for Government and Public Relations of Motor Sich there. He did this until 2000.

== Political career ==
During a by-election in 2000, he was elected to the Verkhovna Rada representing Labour Ukraine for district no. 79 (within Zaporizhzhia Oblast). He later became a member of the Party of Regions in 2005, and was re-elected continuously up until the snap 2014 Ukrainian parliamentary election. He represented district no. 79 until 2006, when he became part of the party list for Party of Regions, but returned to being elected from a district in 2012 when he was elected to district no. 74. In 2010 Sukhyi served as a Governor of Ternopil Oblast.

Following the events of Euromaidan, Sukhyi announced his plans to withdraw from the Party of Regions faction in parliament, but then withdrew this and said he was detained by a group of young men while returning from Morshyn who he said "compelled him to write a statement" and forced him to read it on camera.

== Legal issues ==
Since June 2018, he has been placed on the nationwide wanted list by the Ministry of Internal Affairs under Article 364, part 2 and Article 336, part 2 of the Criminal Code of Ukraine. He has been missing since 26 February 2015.
