= Marylivka =

Former khutor in Chortkiv, Ukraine

Marylivka Марилівка
- Khutor
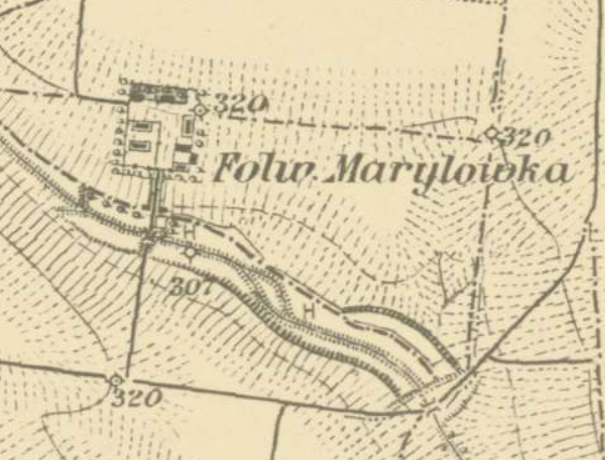
- The village on the Austrian topographical map, 1869–1887

- Location within Ternopil Oblast
- Coordinates: 48°55′33.7″N 25°43′10.7″E
- Country: Ukraine
- Oblast: Ternopil Oblast
- Raion: Chortkiv Raion

Marylivka (Ukrainian: Марилівка; Polish: Marylówka) is a former khutir in Ukraine, now part of the village of Nahirianka, Chortkiv Raion, Ternopil Oblast, Ukraine.

== History ==
In 1882, Marylivka was founded as a hamlet near the Lanckoroński estate.

It is known that a list of residents who "did not receive an opal tree for the fourth quarter to the end of 1920, 18 men and women" was submitted from the local estate's labor service.

== Social sphere ==
In 1928, Graf Lanckoroński founded the Marylivka distillery on the territory of the Marylivka hamlet.

== Famous people ==
=== Lives in Marylivka ===
- Volodymyr Dobrianskyi (born 1966), Ukrainian scientist, archaeologist, historian, speleologist, researcher of antiquities, fortifications, and toponymy
