= Volodymyr Trush =

Ukrainian politician

- Володимир Труш
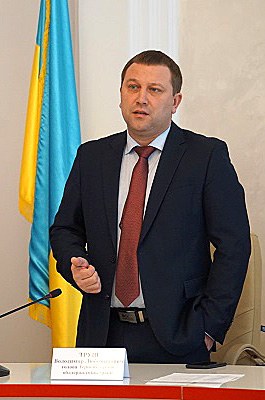

Governor of Ternopil Oblast
- In office 19 March 2020 – 29 December 2023
- Preceded by: Ihor Sopel
- Succeeded by: Volodymyr Vazhynsky (acting)

Personal details
- Born: Volodymyr Lyubomyrovych Trush; 12 April 1980 (age 46) Luchyntsi, Ukraine, Soviet Union

Volodymyr Lyubomyrovych Trush (Ukrainian: Володимир Любомирович Труш; born 12 April 1980), is a Ukrainian public and civil official and entrepreneur who has served as the governor of Ternopil Oblast from 19 March 2020 to 29 December 2023.

== Biography ==
Volodymyr Trush was born on 12 April 1980 in the village of Luchyntsy, Rohatyn Raion, Ivano-Frankivsk Oblast.

In 2002, he graduated from the National University "Lviv Polytechnic" with a degree in finance (Master of Economics and Entrepreneurship) and Philology (Bachelor of Philology).

He worked in the tax police of the state tax administration in the Ivano-Frankivsk Oblast from 2002 to 2008. He was the chief specialist of the security service and director of Igromir LLC from 2008 to 2009). He was an assistant-consultant to the people's deputy of Ukraine in 2010.

He was a private entrepreneur from 2016 to 2019.

He became the director of AVT-Zapad LLC in 2019. The same year, he graduated from the Dubno branch of the Open International University for Human Development "Ukraine" (Bachelor of Laws).

From November 28, 2019, to March 19, 2020, he was the Head of the Rohatyn District State Administration of the Ivano-Frankivsk Oblast.

On 18 March 2020, the Cabinet of Ministers supported Trush's appointment to the post of Governor of Ternopil Oblast. On 19 March, we has sworn into office.

He contracted the coronavirus twice in 2020 and in 2021.

On 29 December 2023 Ukrainian President Volodymyr Zelenskyy dismissed Trush as Governor of Ternopil Oblast.

He is fluent in Russian and English.
