= Mikołaj Firlej (1588–1635) =

Mikołaj Firlej (1588–1635) was a Polish–Lithuanian Commonwealth szlachcic and politician. Starost of Kazimierz Dolny from 1596, Lublin from 1614; castellan of Bielsk Podlaski from 1615, Wojnicz from 1618; voivode of Sandomierz from 1633. He was also a marshal of the Crown Tribunal and deputy to Sejm.

He was the son of the voivode of Kraków Mikołaj Firlej and Elżbieta Ligięzianka. In his youth, for twelve years he studied in Germany, England, Italy, Spainan and France. Supporter of Habsburgs and king Władysław IV Waza.

Married to Regina Oleśnicka, father of Zbigniew, Henryk, Stanisław, Andrzej and three daughters. Later married to Maria Mohylanka.
