= Stepan Barna =

Ukrainian activist and politician (born 1979)

- Степан Барна
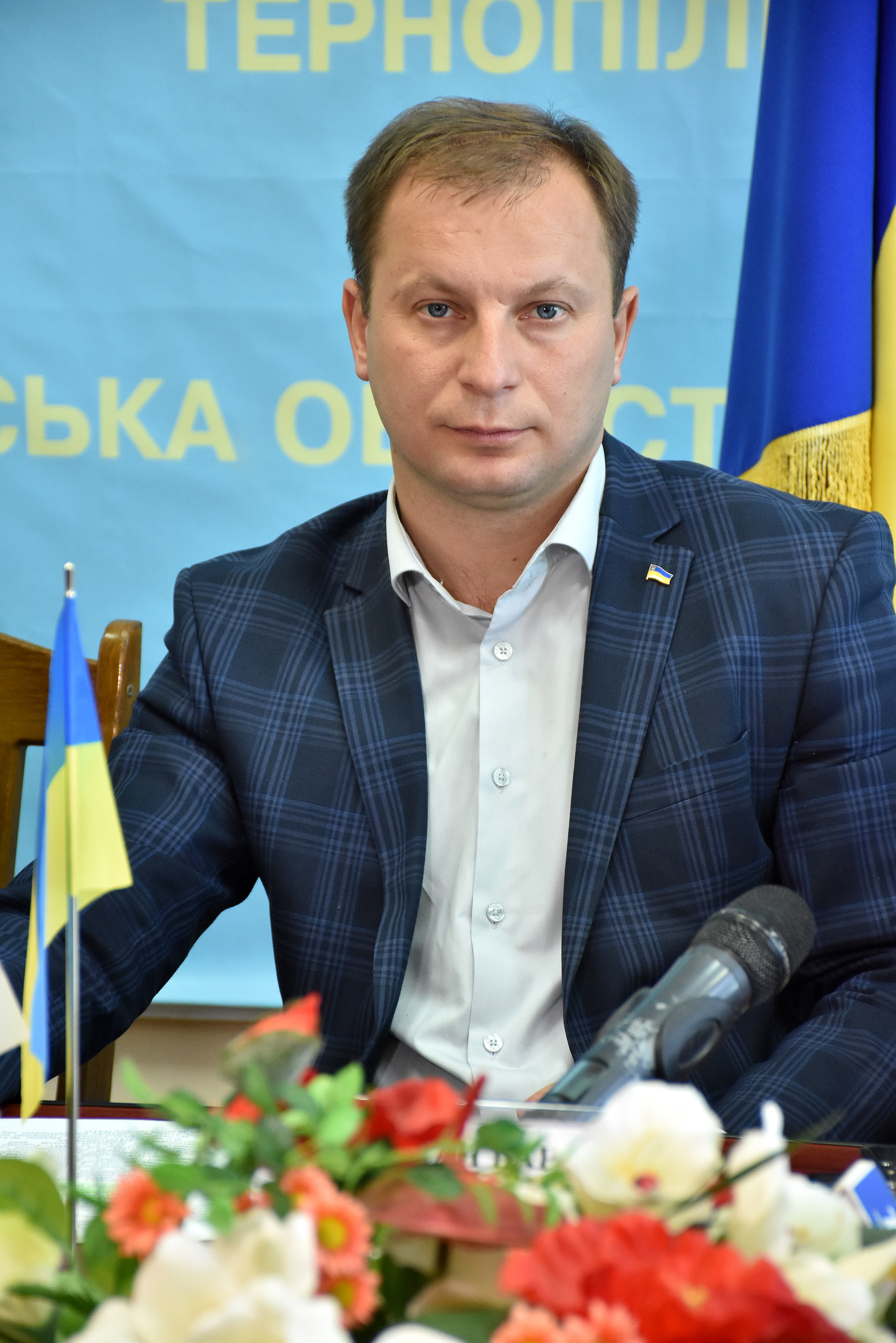

Governor of Ternopil Oblast
- In office 2015–2019
- Preceded by: Oleh Syrotyuk
- Succeeded by: Ihor Sopel

Personal details
- Born: Stepan Stepanovych Barna; 9 October 1979 (age 46) Nahiryanka, Chortkiv Raion, Ukraine, Soviet Union
- Party: Our Ukraine; For Ukraine; Petro Poroshenko Bloc
- Education: Ternopil Pedagogical University; Institute of political and ethno-national research Ternopil Economic University

Stepan Stepanovych Barna (Ukrainian: Степан Степанович Барна; born 9 October 1979) is a Ukrainian political activist and former member of the Verkhovna Rada for the Petro Poroshenko Bloc.

== Early life ==
Barna was born on 9 October 1979 in the village of Nahiryanka, which was located in the Chortkiv Raion which was then part of the Ukrainian SSR. He first graduated from the Faculty of History at the Ternopil Pedagogical University, and then went to the Institute of Postgraduate Education at the Ternopil Economic University. He furthered his education by taking postgraduate courses at Institute of political and ethno-national research of the National Academy of Sciences of Ukraine.

After completing his education, from 1999 to 2004 as the chairman of the Ternopil Regional Scientific Research Society "Oberehy", while also simultaneously being an advisor to the Minister of Youth and Sports and hosting a program on the radio of Ternopil. Starting in 2004, he started holding multiple positions in Ukrainian charity organizations, some of which were associated with the Our Ukraine party specifically its youth union.

== Political career ==
In 2005, he held his first political position when he became a member of the Presidium of the Council of the People's Union of the Our Ukraine party. In 2006, Barna became a member of the Ternopil Oblast council. He attempted to win a seat to the Verkhovna Rada during the 2007 Ukrainian parliamentary election, but failed to win his bid, and so he ran again in the elections for the Ternopil Oblast council in 2009.

From 2014 to 2015, he was a member of the Verkhovna Rada representing Petro Poroshenko Bloc, representing the 163rd constitutency of Ternopil, whereafter he served as Governor of Ternopil Oblast for four years as the Rada did not allow dual mandates.

== Personal life and military service ==
Barna and his brother Oleh, also a former member of the Verkhovna Rada, fought in the 68th Jager Brigade during the Russian invasion of Ukraine, initially in the Zhytomyr Oblast and Kyiv. Oleh was killed in action on April 17, 2023. Since then, he has served in the 10th Mountain Assault Brigade as a sergeant and squad commander, which has been stationed in the Donbas and Kolomyia.
