= Yahilnytsia Castle =

Castle in Yahilnytsia, Ternopil Oblast, Ukraine

- Ягільницький замок
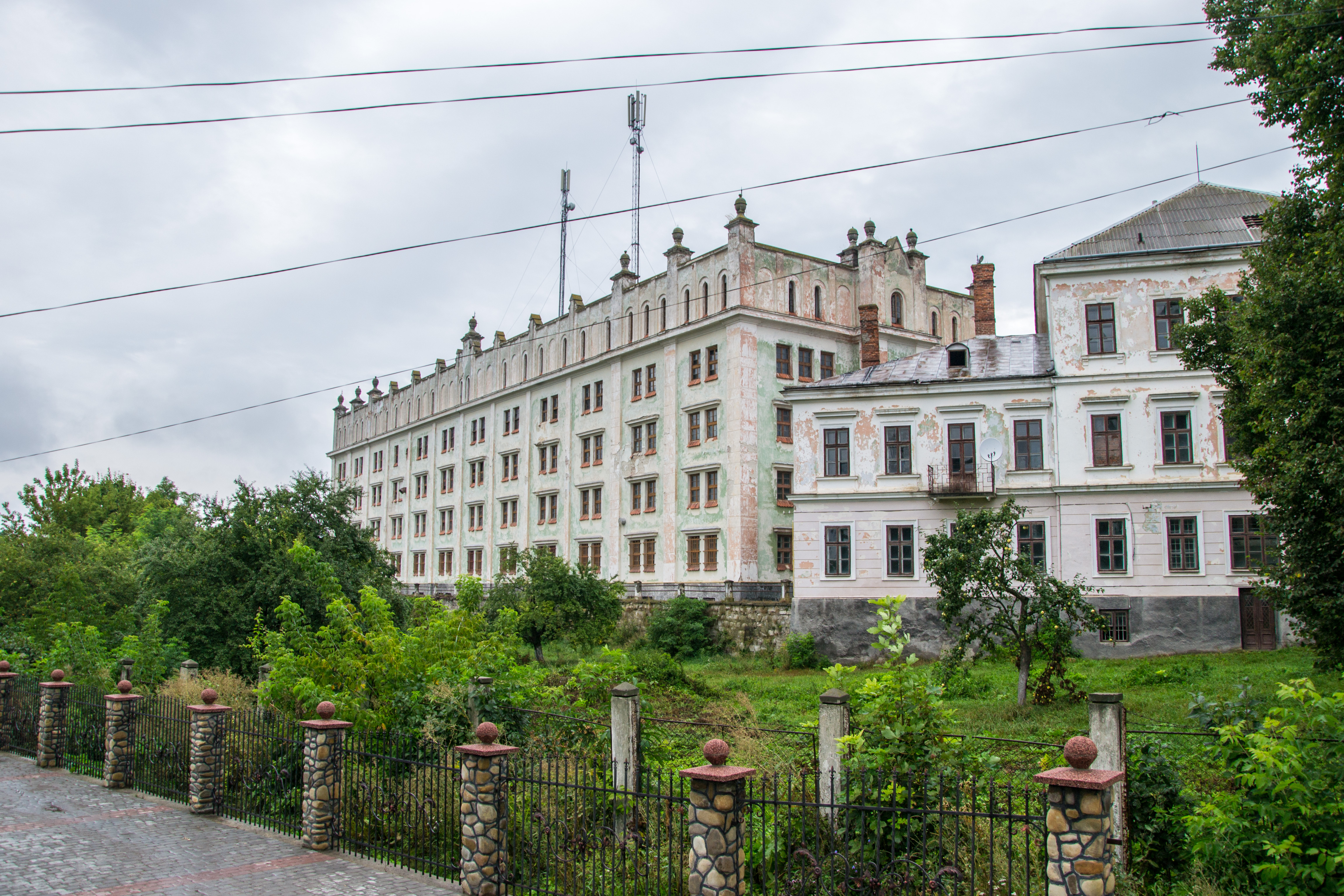
- The castle in 2014
- Interactive map of the Yahilnytsia Castle area

General information
- Status: Architectural monument of local importance
- Location: Yahilnytsia, Chortkiv Raion, Ternopil Oblast, Ukraine
- Coordinates: 48°56′12.1″N 25°44′30.9″E

The Yahilnytsia Castle (Ukrainian: Ягільницький замок, romanized: Yahilnyts'kyi zamok) is located in Yahilnytsia, Ternopil Oblast, Ukraine. The castle, built at the end of the 15th century as a wooden one, is located on a hill in the small village of Nahirianka near Yahilnytsia, and an architectural monument of local importance.

== History ==
The stronghold was rebuilt in brick at the turn of the 16th/17th century by Stanisław Lanckoroński, Voivode of Rus and Great Hetman of the Crown. In 1648 the castle resisted a Cossack invasion, but in 1655 it was captured after a few days of siege due to treachery. In 1672, as a result of Poland's loss of its eastern lands to the Ottoman Empire after the capitulation of the Polish fortress in Kamieniec Podolski (now Kamianets-Podilskyi), it was the site of the evacuation of the fortress crew and was subsequently surrendered to the Turks by its owner Hieronim Lanckoroński, after which it became the seat of Ibrahim Szejtan. The castle was recaptured by Ensign Sieniawski in September 1673, and in January 1674 Hieronim Lanckoroński set out from it against the Turks under the command of Voivode Jan Potocki. It was captured again by the Turks in 1680, but in 1683 it was permanently captured by the Poles thanks to Hetman Andrzej Potocki's Podolia campaign. Officially, the castle returned to Poland in 1699 by virtue of the Treaty of Karlowitz, and after being rebuilt from war damage it became the Lanckoroński's residence again.

In 1817 Antoni Lanckoroński sold the castle to the Austrian government, which set up a large tobacco factory in it. It operated intermittently until the 1990s. From 2000, the castle has been privately owned.

== Location, architecture ==
The castle was built on a high and steep hill that was difficult to conquer, and its skillful bastion fortification made it an impregnable fortress. The castle included residential and outbuildings, it was defended from the south by two bastions, the entrance led through a gate preceded by a bridge over a deep ditch. A stone coat of arms of the Lanckoroński family was preserved on the castle gate.

== Bibliography ==
- Filip Sulimierski, Bronisław Chlebowski, Władysław Walewski, Słownik geograficzny Królestwa Polskiego i innych krajów słowiańskich, t. III, Warszawa, 1880–1902, ss. 367–68.
