= Oleh Syrotyuk =

Ukrainian politician

Oleh Syrotiuk
- Олег Сиротюк
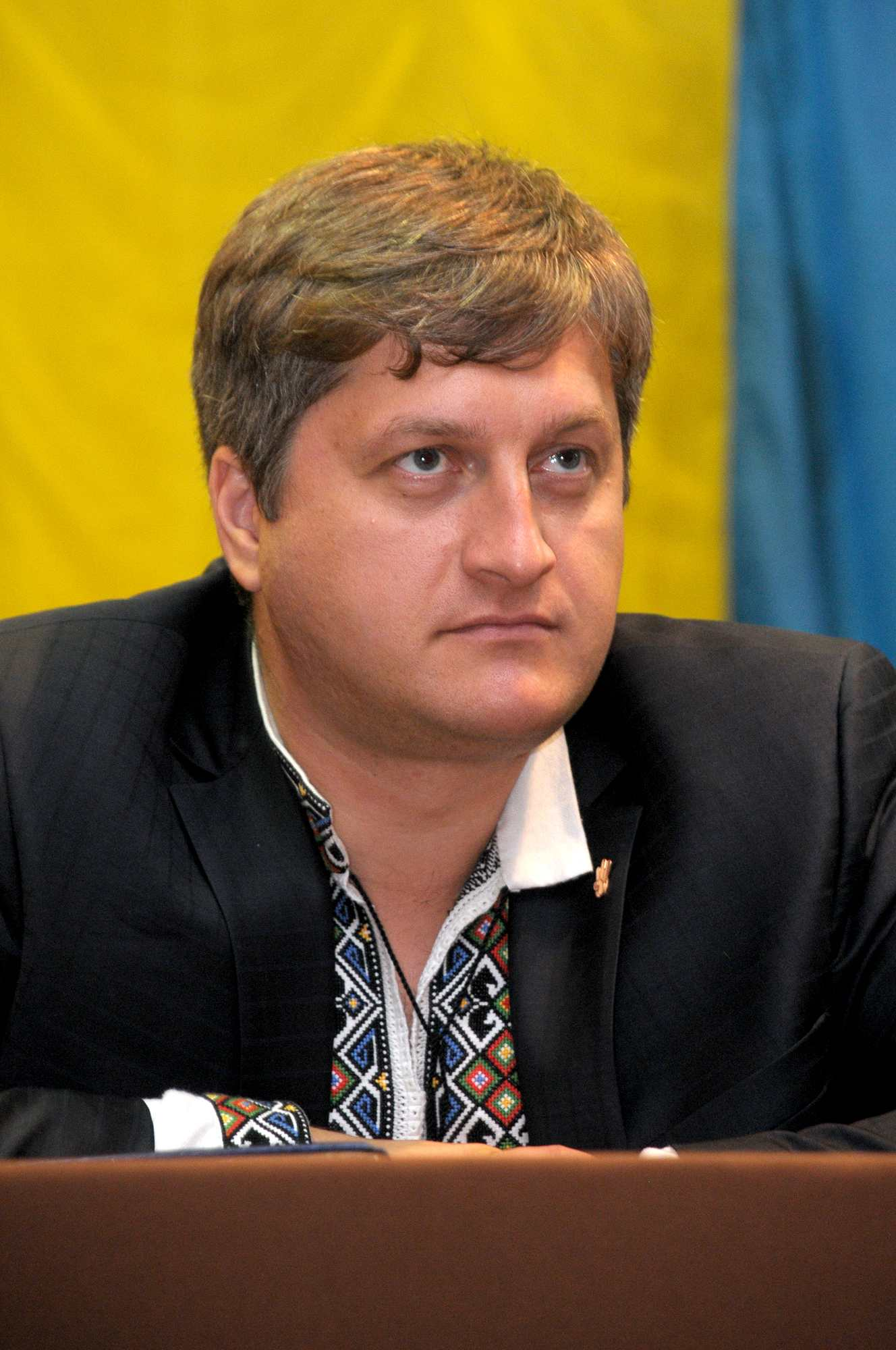

Governor of Ternopil Oblast
- In office 2 March 2014 – 18 November 2014
- Preceded by: Valentyn Khoptyan
- Succeeded by: Ivan Krysak (acting)

Personal details
- Born: Oleh Myroslavovych Syrotyuk; 18 February 1978 (age 48) Ternopil, Ukrainian SSR
- Party: Svoboda
- Education: Kiev University; Ternopil Academy of People's Economy

Oleh Myroslavovych Syrotiuk (Ukrainian: Олег Мирославович Сиротюк; born 18 February 1978, Ternopil, Ukraine) is a Ukrainian activist and later politician, member of the Verkhovna Rada.

== Biography ==
Syrotyuk was born on 18 February 1978 within the city of Ternopil, which was then part of the Ukrainian SSR in the Soviet Union. In 2000, after five years, he graduated from the Ternopil Academy of People's Economy. In 1999-2012 he was activist of various patriotic youth organizations. He later became head of the Ternopil branch for the party Svoboda, head of the information support department of PP "Okarinskyi M.M.", and Head of the Center for National-Patriotic Education of Ukrainian Youth.

He first attempted to unsuccessfully run for office in 1998 for the Ternopil City Council, and later in 2006 also the Verkhovna Rada on the party list of Svoboda (no. 29 on the list), but was not elected in either instance. However, in 2009, he again stood as a candidate for the Ternopil Oblast Council representing Svoboda, to which he was elected. During the 2012 Ukrainian parliamentary election, he was elected from the party list of Svoboda (no. 16 on the list), and in parliament he served as Deputy Chair of the Committee on State Building and Local Self‑Government before resigning his mandate on 17 March 2014 to become Governor of Ternopil Oblast. He was also, during this time, assigned by the Svoboda party to oversee Poltava Oblast, where he maintained an office at the time. As an MP, he was a prominent advocate for granting Chortkiv the title of city of oblast significance, arguuing that Chortkiv functioned as an administrative center for the southern Ternopil Oblast region, as he believeed the status would accelerate local development.

In 2014 Syrotyuk served as a Governor of Ternopil Oblast. Following this, he ran as a candidate for the Ternopil Oblast Council in 2015, to which he was elected, and he was re-elected to the post in 2020.
