= Yahilnytsia =

Village in Ternopil Oblast, Ukraine

- City
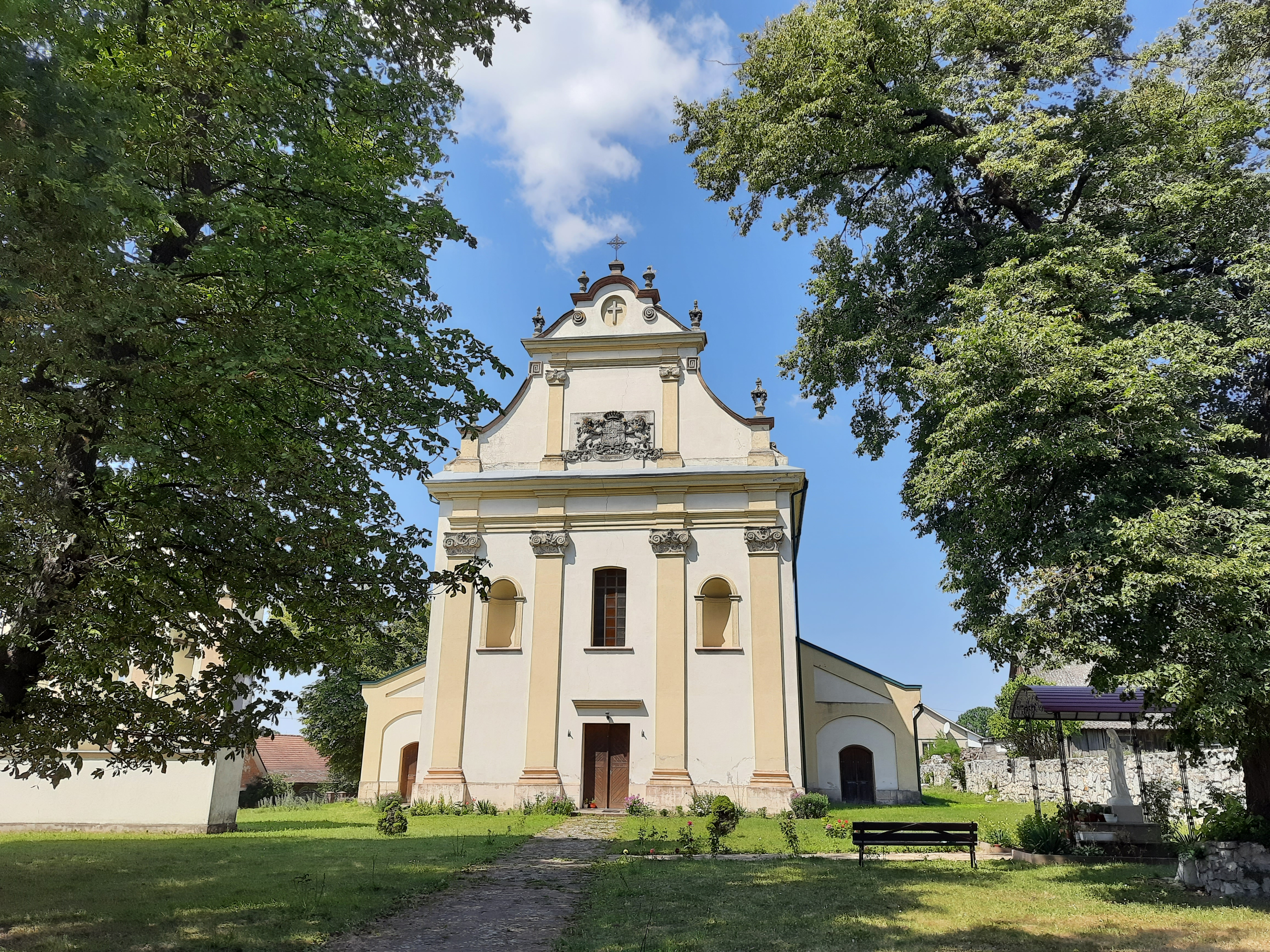
- Church of the Assumption

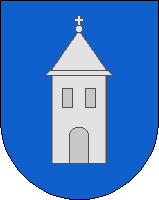
- Coat of arms

- Location within Ukraine Location within Ternopil Oblast
- Coordinates: 48°56′37″N 25°44′36″E
- Country: Ukraine
- Oblast: Ternopil
- Raion: Chortkiv
- Town Status: 1518 – 1934; 1991
- Area: 36.99 km^{2} (14.28 sq mi)
- Elevation: 194 m (636 ft)
- Population (2024): 1,030
  - Density: 355.23/km^{2} (920.0/sq mi)

Yahilnytsia is a village in Chortkiv Raion (district) of Ternopil Oblast (province) in western Ukraine. It belongs to Nahirianka rural hromada, one of the hromadas of Ukraine. The village was a formidable center of Jewish activity prior to World War II. The Polish village of Jagielnica is its namesake and was founded by residents of this town fleeing Nazi occupation.

== Etymology ==
According to Polish researchers, the name "Jagielnica" derives from "Jagiellonian", the name of the Polish royal family. Ukrainian researcher Mikhail Kryschuk wrote in his 2011 book Toponomy of Ternopil that the Ukrainian "Yahil'nytsya" may derive from the Lithuanian name for the Slavic deity Jarilo and/or the Tatar word meaning "hell" or "lofty place" (Tatar: яґел, translit. yagel).

== History ==
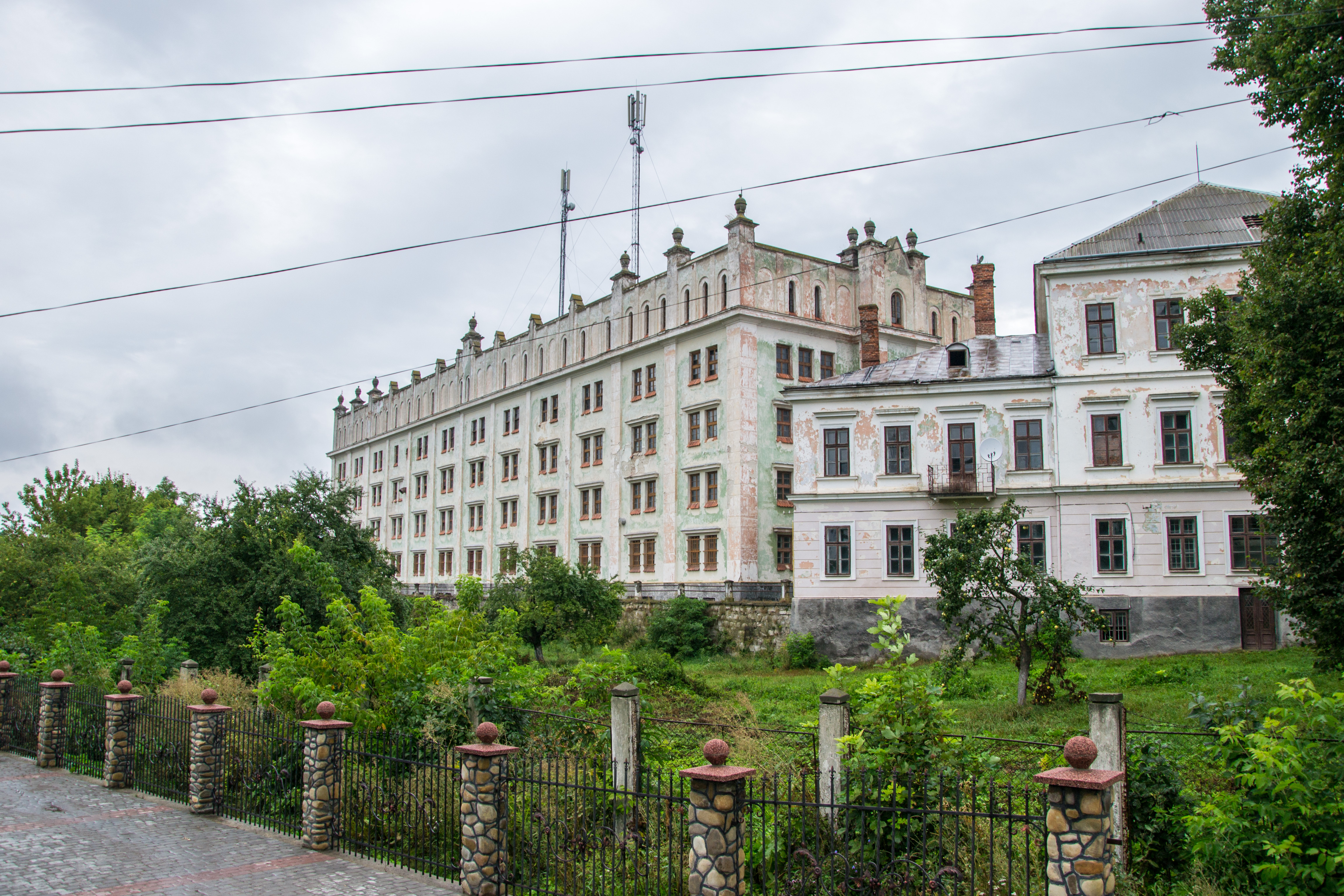
Castle

Archeology suggests the territory occupied by the modern town was inhabited as far back as 3000 BC, as evidenced by uncovered burials dating to the Bronze Age. Nevertheless, Yahil'nytsya is first mentioned with its more recognizably historical name of "Jagielnica" in 1448 after being visited by the Polish king Casimir IV. In 1454, the town was ruled by Teodoryk Buczacki Jazłowiecki of the Buczacki (Abdank) nobility. In 1517, Jagielnica became a private town of a nobility, and a year later it was granted with official town status. In 1581, king Stephen Báthory handed Jagielnica and a number of other land portions to the voivode Stanisław Lanckoroński (died 1535) as reward for his loyal service to the queen Anna Jagiellon. During the Khmelnytsky Uprising, the town saw intense fighting as the citizens attempted to overthrow what they perceived as a society controlled by Poles and Turks. Armies led by Hetman Bohdan Khmelnytsky failed to storm the Yahilnytsia castle, located in the town. The town was captured by the Cossacks in 1655, but was returned to Poland two years later as part of the Truce of Andrusovo. Following subsequent conflicts, Jagielnica was briefly controlled by Turkic forces between 1669 and 1672, and later by Austria from 1772 onwards. During this time, town was a significant geopolitical entity in southwestern Ukraine. Following the Austrian annexation in 1772, Jagielnica was made part of the Zalishchyky County, the Habsburg (Galician) predecessor to Zalishchyky Raion.

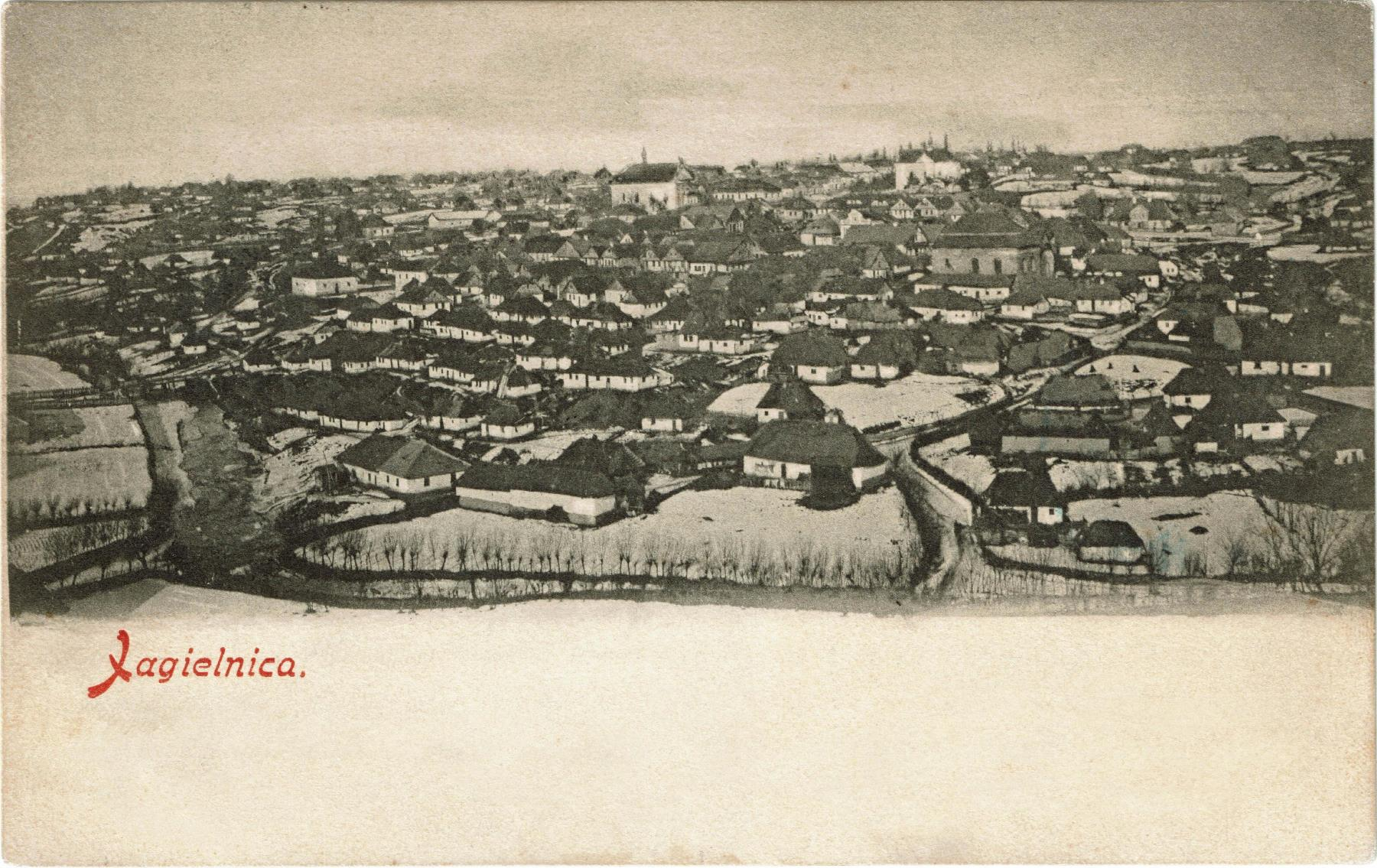
Jagielnica, c. 1900

Industry increased over the following centuries. In 1904, a fire in the town razed twenty buildings and left fifty families homeless. In October 1914, Russian forces began occupation of Jagielnica as the front line pushed into the town for most of the war. One survivor stated "Our life was a constant fear of the Cossacks." In July 1917, Central Powers forces pushed through nearby Ternopil and broke through Russian trenches, forcing Russian troops in Jagielnica to retreat, ultimately allowing Austria-Hungary to capture and annex the town. Following the collapse of the Austro-Hungarian Empire in 1918, Jagielnica was part of the land proclaimed to be the new West Ukrainian People's Republic. In the subsequent wars, Jagielnica became the scene of the great Chortkiv offensive. Jagielnica became part of Poland once again following the Peace of Riga which ended the wars in 1921. In 1929, Jagielnica merged with numerous other towns in the area. During the Pacification of Ukrainians in Eastern Galicia in the 1930s, Ukrainians were banned from Jagielnica in favor of allowing entry to Rusyns. During this period, it was a crime to show Ukrainian pride in any way. In 1934, Yahil'nytsya's status as a town was revoked by the government. During World War II, the USSR secured control over Yahil'nytsya and murdered several prominent villagers through the NKVD. In the fall of 1939 roughly 2,000 refugees entered Yahil'nytsya from Poland, but the Soviet Union displaced them to other parts of the country by the summer of 1940. From July 6, 1941, to March 24, 1944, Yahil'nytsya was controlled by Nazi forces, many Jews were slaughtered. On November 27, 1942, more than 52 people from both Yahil'nytsya and nearby Chortkiv were executed for alleged cooperation with the Organization of Ukrainian Nationalists in what is now called the "Yahilnytsya tragedy". A memorial dedicated to this event was erected in 1992. The town experienced at least two mass shootings of Jewish prisoners. Yahil'nytsya returned to Communist control following the end of the war, and in 1948 more than 167 farms were forced to collectivize during the Three-Year Plan.

Yahil'nytsya has been controlled by independent Ukraine since the collapse of the Soviet Union in 1991.

== People ==
- Halyna Hrytskiv (1937–2016), Ukrainian public and cultural figure, poet, publicist, and Easter egg maker
- Vasyl Vyslotskyi (born 1967), Ukrainian businessman, public and political figure, philanthropist

== Sources ==
- (in Ukrainian) Бубернак С., Мельничук Б., Ягільниця // Ternopil Encyclopedic Dictionary: in 4 v. / editorial board: H. Yavorskyi and other, Ternopil: "Zbruch", 2008, V. 3: П—Я, S. 680. — ISBN 978-966-528-279-2.
- (in Ukrainian) Бубурнак С., Мельничук Б., Федечко М., Ягільниця // Ternopil Oblast. History of cities and villages: in 3 v. / Ternopil: "Terno-graph", 2014, V. 3: М—Ш, S. 525—528. — ISBN 978-966-457-246-7.
