= Ihor Sopel =

Ukrainian entrepreneur and politician (born 1974)

Head of the Ternopil Regional State Administration
- In office 31 October 2019 – 18 March 2020
- President: Volodymyr Zelenskyy
- Preceded by: Stepan Barna
- Succeeded by: Volodymyr Trush

Personal details
- Born: 16 September 1974 (age 52) Khorostkiv, Ukrainian SSR, Soviet Union
- Occupation: Politician

Ihor Mykhailovych Sopel (born 16 September 1974) is a Ukrainian entrepreneur and politician who served as Head of the Ternopil Regional State Administration from October 2019 to March 2020.
