= Volodymyr Hevko =

Ukrainian economist and politician

- Володимир Гевко
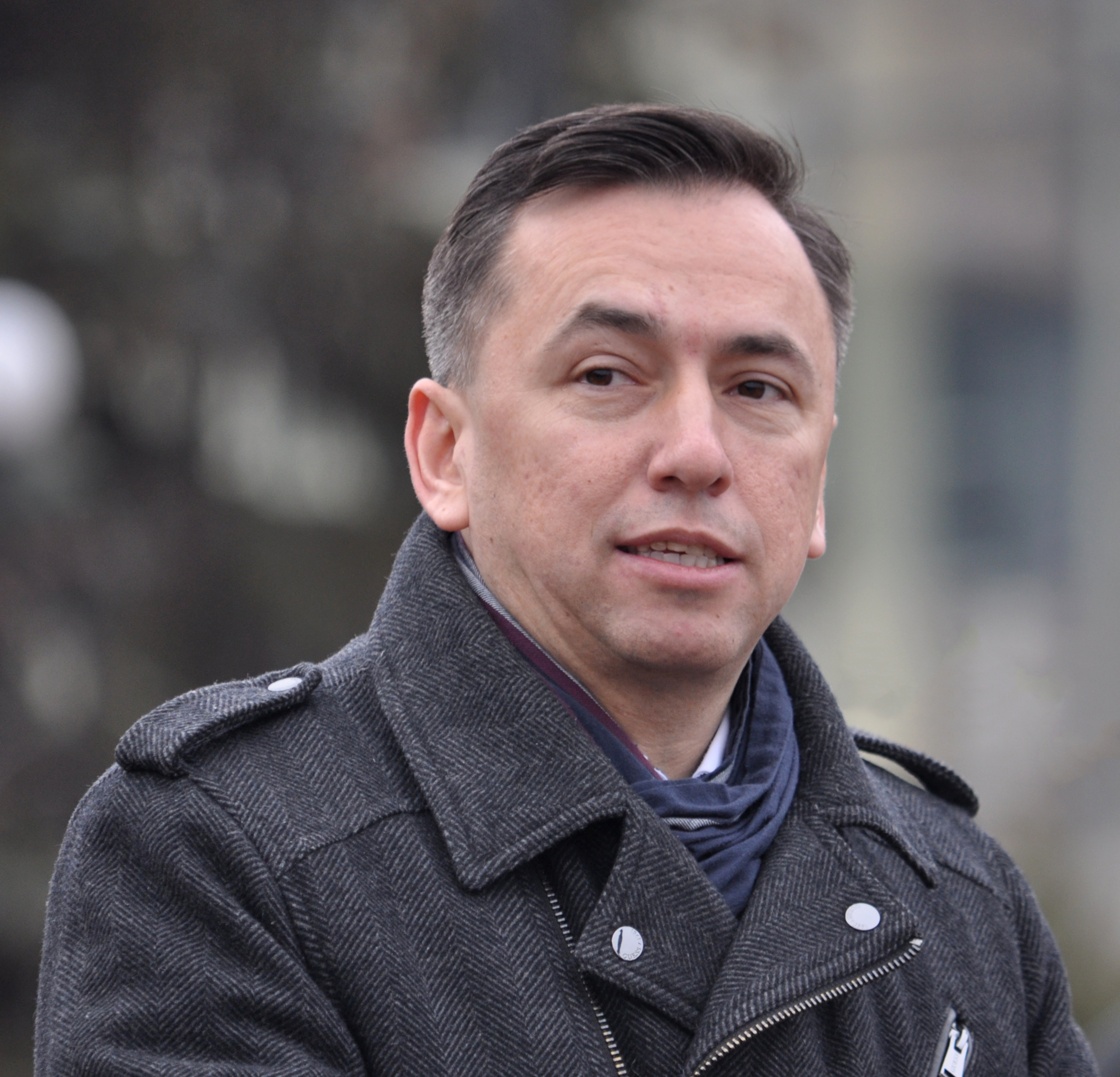
- Hevko in 2020

People's Deputy of Ukraine
- Incumbent
- Assumed office 29 August 2019
- Preceded by: Oleh Barna
- Constituency: Ternopil Oblast, No. 167

Personal details
- Born: 20 August 1975 (age 50) Tovste, Ukrainian SSR, Soviet Union (now Ukraine)
- Party: Servant of the People
- Other political affiliations: Independent (until 2019); For Ukraine! (2010); Petro Poroshenko Bloc (2015)

Volodymyr Leonidovych Hevko (Ukrainian: Володимир Леонідович Гевко; born 20 August 1975) is a Ukrainian economist, businessman, and politician currently serving as a People's Deputy of Ukraine, representing Ukraine's 167th electoral district. He is a member of Servant of the People.

== Early life and business career ==
Volodymyr Leonidovych Hevko was born on 20 August 1975 in the town of Tovste, in what was then the Soviet Union. He graduated from Ternopil National Technical University in 1997, specialising in organisational management. He worked as marketing coordinator at the "Ternopilshchyna Business Incubator" fund from 1996 to 1999, before later working at the Ternopil Meat Processing Facility as a marketing director until 2000 and as commercial director of the Ternopil Gazette from 2002 to 2004. Since 2001, he has been director of Profi-Tsentr, an educational and consulting company.

From 2013 to 2017, Hevko served as an associate professor of the department of managing at Ternopil National Technical University, having previously worked in the department since 1995.

== Political career ==
Hevko was a member of the Entrepreneurs' Council of the Cabinet of Ministers of Ukraine from 2001. He unsuccessfully sought a seat in the Ternopil City Council as a member of For Ukraine! in 2010, and again unsuccessfully ran for the seat in 2015 as a member of the Petro Poroshenko Bloc.

In the 2019 Ukrainian parliamentary election, Hevko ran successfully to become a People's Deputy of Ukraine from Ukraine's 167th electoral district. At the time of his election, he was an independent. He joined Servant of the People on 10 November 2019, at the party's congress in Kyiv.

He is a member of the Committee of the Verkhovna Rada on issues of budget. It was reported by the analytical portal Slovo i Dilo on 23 February 2021 that Hevko had fulfilled only 10% of his electoral promises.

== Scandals ==
On February 1, 2023, a panel of judges of the High Anti-Corruption Court granted Hevko's motion and released him from criminal liability for committing an offense under Part 1 of Article 366-2 of the Criminal Code of Ukraine. He was suspected of failing to declare property worth UAH 3.7 million. (~1$ million).
