= Maria Mohylanka =

- Maria Amalia Mohylanka
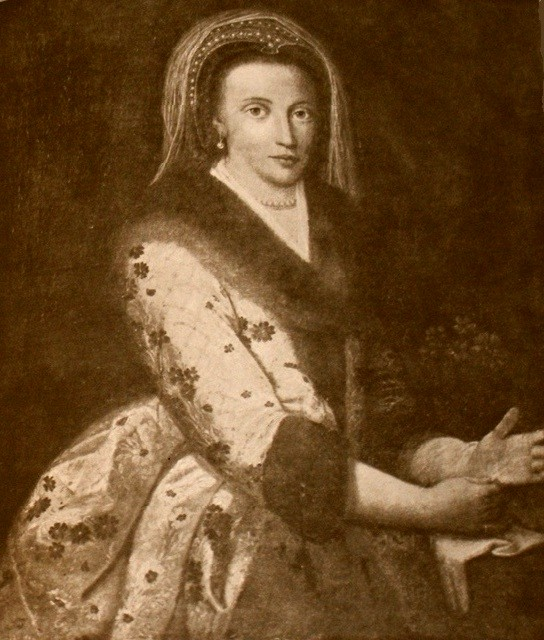
- Maria Mohylanka
- Born: 1591
- Died: 1638 (aged 46–47); Warsaw
- Other names: Marianna Mohylanka
- Occupations: Noblewoman, patron
- Spouse(s): Stefan Potocki; Mikołaj Firlej
- Children: Piotr Potocki; Jan Potocki; Paweł Potocki; Katarzyna Potocka; Anna Potocka
- Father: Ieremia Movilă

Maria Amalia Mohylanka (sometimes Marianna Mohylanka, born in 1591, died in 1638) was a daughter of Ieremia Movilă, Moldavian hospodar, wife of Stefan Potocki, voivode of Bratslav, and Mikołaj Firlej, voivode of Sandomierz, holder of the Kazimierz starosty in 1636–1638.

== Biography ==
She brought an icon of the Virgin Mary to St. Nicholas Church in Buchach, which is now located on the eastern wall of the altar. She was also a generous patron of the Manyava Skete. She gave her residence in Kamianets-Podilskyi to the Dominican Sisters in that city for use as a convent. She expanded the castle in Buchach. At her expense, a brick Orthodox church dedicated to the Holy Trinity was built in Buchach.

During her husband's expedition to Moldova, which ended with the Battle of Cornul lui Sas, Anna de domo Potocka, wife of Stanisław Golski, deposited a treasure in Pidhaitsi, which was later the subject of lengthy disputes and court proceedings, as well as an inn in 1618.

After the death of her first husband, Stefan Potocki, she married Mikołaj Firlej, the voivode of Sandomierz. She then married priest Wiśniowiecki.

She had two daughters from her marriage to Stefan Potocki, Katarzyna (1619-1642) and Anna. Katarzyna married Janusz Radziwiłł in 1638. Anna married three times. First to Aleksander Dominik Kazanowski, then to Bogusław Jerzy Słuszka, and finally to Mikołaj Stanisławski. She had three sons with Stefan Potocki: Piotr, Paweł, and Jan.

Her sisters also married Polish magnates: Regina married Michał Wiśniowiecki (she was the mother of Jeremi Wiśniowiecki), Katarzyna, famous for her beauty, married Prince Samuel Korecki, and Anna married Jan Sędziwój Czarnkowski.

== Bibliography ==
- Kasper Niesiecki: Mohyła herb. W: Korona polska przy złotej wolności starożytnymi wszystkich katedr, prowincji i rycerstwa klejnotami.... T. III. Lwów, 1740, s. 288–289.
- Władysław Łoziński: Prawem i lewem. Obyczaje na Czerwonej Rusi w pierwszej połowie XVII wieku. T. 2. Lwów : nakładem księgarni H. Altenberga, 1904. [dostęp 2016-12-23]
- Domniemany portret Marii Mohylanki. W: Władysław Łoziński. Życie polskie w dawnych wiekach (1907). IV edycja. Lwów : Altenberg – Gubrynowicz & syn, 1921, s. 131.
- Tomasz Henryk Skrzypecki: Potok Złoty na tle historii polskich kresów południowo-wschodnich. Opole: Solpress, 2010, 256 s. ISBN 978-83-927244-4-5.
