= Zhyznomyr =

Zhyznomyr Жизномир
- Interactive map of Zhyznomyr
- Coordinates: 49°01′55″N 25°22′56″E
- Country: Ukraine
- Oblast: Ternopil Oblast
- Raion: Chortkiv Raion

Area
  - Total: 42.58 km^{2} (16.44 sq mi)
- Elevation: 342 m (1,122 ft)

Population (2014)
  - Total: ▼1,583
- Time zone: UTC+2 (EET)
  - Summer (DST): UTC+3 (EEST)
- Postal code: 48432
- Area code: +380 3544

Zhyznomyr (Ukrainian: Жизномир) is a village in Chortkiv Raion (district) of Ternopil Oblast (province) in western Ukraine. It belongs to Buchach urban hromada, one of the hromadas of Ukraine. The Strypa River flows to the eastern edge of the village.

== History ==
The first written mention of the town comes from 1606. Zhyznomyr belonged to the Kingdom of Poland from 1569 to the Polish–Lithuanian Commonwealth, to Austrian empires (Habsburg monarchy, Austrian Empire, Austria-Hungary) from 1772 until 1918, and in 1918-1919 to the West Ukrainian People's Republic.

The reading room of Ukrainian society Prosvita operated in the village.

Until 18 July 2020, Zhyznomyr belonged to Buchach Raion. The raion was abolished in July 2020 as part of the administrative reform of Ukraine, which reduced the number of raions of Ternopil Oblast to three. The area of Buchach Raion was merged into Chortkiv Raion.

== Attractions ==
- Church of Jesus Christ
- Chapel
- Memorial cross in honor of the abolition of serfdom (restored in 1992)
- Memorial cross on the spot death of 3 soldiers Ukrainian Insurgent Army (1992)
- Monument to Taras Shevchenko (1964)
- Symbolic grave of fighters for freedom of Ukraine (1942; restored in 1994) and Ukrainian Sich Riflemen
- Oak of Taras Shevchenko.
