= List of by-elections to the 9th Ukrainian Verkhovna Rada =

This is the list of all by-elections to the 9th convocation of the Verkhovna Rada of Ukraine, held until 24 February 2022. According to the law, by-elections are held twice a year: on the last Sunday of March and the last Sunday of October. If the last Sunday in March or the last Sunday in October on which a by-election is held falls on a holiday or a religious holiday designated as a non-working day under labor law, such by-election shall be held on the following Sunday.

During the fifth and last year of the Verkhovna Rada current convocation mandate no by-elections are held within the twelve months of the end of a parliamentary cycle. A total of 6 by-elections have been called since the inauguration of the 9th Ukrainian Verkhovna Rada.

== Overview ==
Electoral district	Date vacated	Reason	Election day	Outgoing deputy	Party	Deputy elected	Party
179	3 December 2019	Dual mandate after being appointed as the Governor of Kharkiv Oblast	15 March 2020	Oleksiy Kucher	SN	Yulia Svitlychna	Independent
208	23 May 2020	Death by a gunshot	25 October 2020	Valeriy Davydenko	Independent	Anatolii Hunko	SN
87	17 November 2020	Dual mandate after being elected the mayor of Nadvirna	28 March 2021	Zinovii Andriiovych	SN	Vasyl Virastyuk	SN
50	16 December 2020	Dual mandate after being elected the mayor of Pokrovsk	28 March 2021	Ruslan Trebushkin	OB	Andrii Aksionov	Poriadok
184	30 March 2021	Dual mandate after being appointed as the Governor of Cherkasy Oblast	31 October 2021	Oleksandr Skichko	SN	Vitaliy Voitsekhirskyi	SN
197	30 March 2021	Dual mandate after being elected the mayor of Kherson	31 October 2021	Ihor Kolykhaiev	Independent	Serhiy Kozyr	SN

== Planned by-elections ==
Due to the Russian invasion of Ukraine and the subsequent imposition of martial law, holding elections during it is prohibited by Constitution in Ukraine. Despite losing those mandates for different reasons, Central Electoral Commission couldn't call those elections due to the martial law, however, they would've been held, if the martial law had been lifted before the fifth and last year of the Verkhovna Rada current convocation mandate. A total of 10 by-elections have been planned since 24 February 2022 of the 9th Ukrainian Verkhovna Rada.

Electoral district	Date vacated	Reason	Election day	Outgoing deputy	Party
206	8 October 2021	Death by coronary heart disease	27 March 2022	Anton Polyakov	SN
60	1 July 2022	Dual mandate after being appointed Human Rights Ombudsman	30 October 2022 (presumably)	Dmytro Lubinets	Independent
57	8 July 2022	Resignation for personal reasons	30 October 2022 (presumably)	Vadym Novynskyi	OB
186	28 August 2022	Death by a gunshot	30 October 2022 (presumably)	Oleksii Kovalov	SN
176	21 September 2022	Resignation for personal reasons	30 October 2022 (presumably)	Dmytro Shentsev	OB
139	3 November 2022	Loss of Ukrainian citizenship	26 March 2023 (presumably)	Ihor Vasylkovskyi	SN
159	13 January 2023	Loss of Ukrainian citizenship	26 March 2023 (presumably)	Andrii Derkach	Independent
50	13 January 2023	Resignation for personal reasons	26 March 2023 (presumably)	Andrii Aksionov	Poriadok
40	23 February 2023	Resignation for personal reasons	29 October 2023 (presumably) (Note: However, the date is higely unlikely, as according to the Electoral Code, next parliamentary elections would've been held on 29 October 2023 as well.)	Oleksandr Trukhin	SN
47	24 February 2023	Resignation for personal reasons	29 October 2023 (presumably)	Yuriy Solod	OPZZh

== See also ==
- 9th Ukrainian Verkhovna Rada
- List of members of the parliament of Ukraine, 2019–
