= Denys Skoryi =

Surgeon, Oncologist, Professor and Politician based in Ukraine

- Скорий Денис Ігоревич
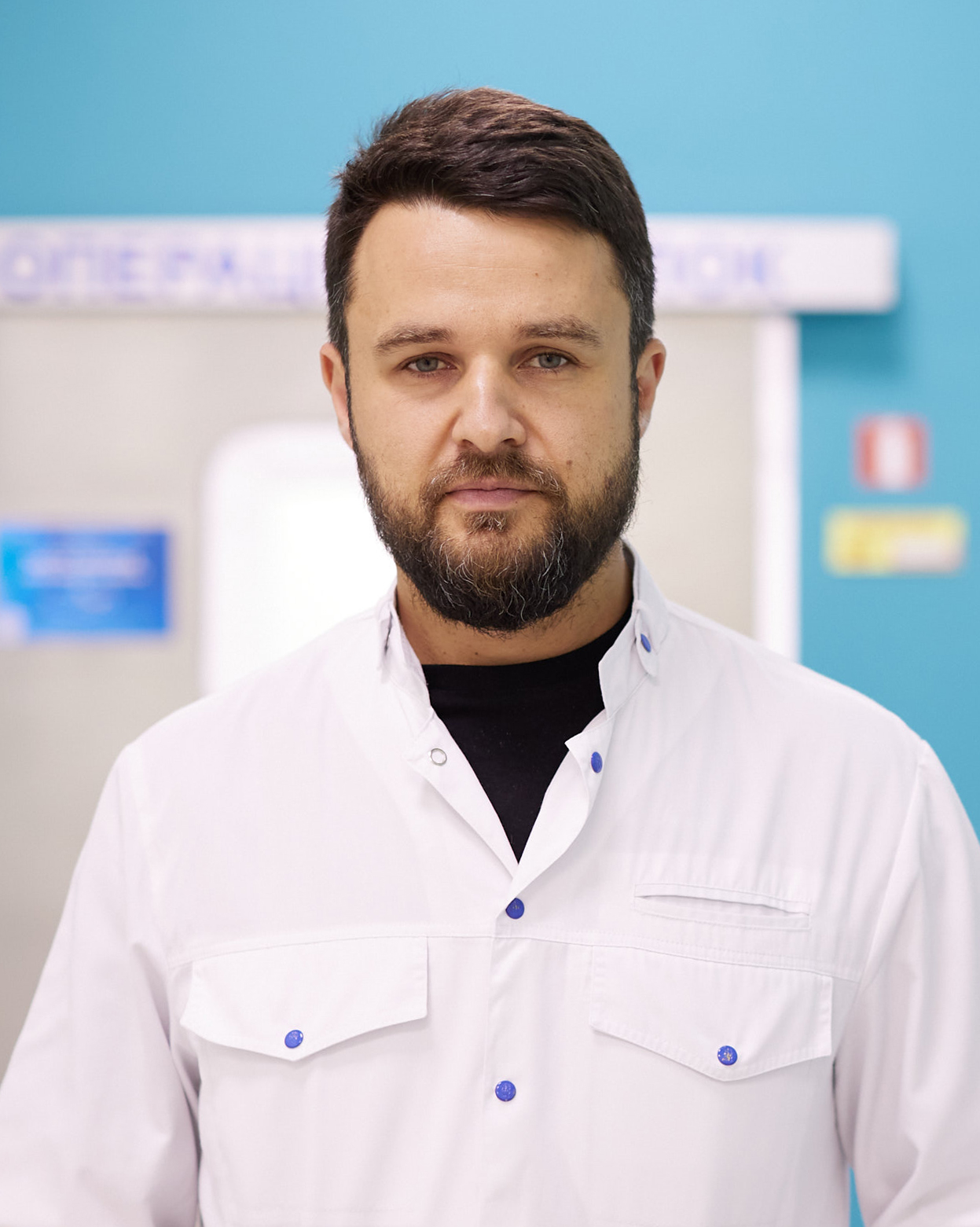
- Born: April 16, 1979 (age 47); Kharkiv, Ukraine
- Education: Kharkiv National Medical University, Kharkiv, Ukraine (graduated 2002)
- Occupations: Central Hospital in Valky, Ukraine (surgeon); Institute of General and Emergency Surgery of the National Medical Academy of Ukraine in Kharkiv (surgeon); department of liver surgery of the Institute of General and Emergency Surgery (senior research fellow and leading researcher); oncology department of the Kharkiv National Medical University (professor); Regional Center of Oncology in Kharkiv, Ukraine (CEO)
- Years active: 2004–present
- Known for: Ukrainian surgeon and oncologist, CEO of the Kharkiv Regional Center of Oncology. Professor in the oncology department of the Kharkiv National Medical University. Since 2020, a political figure, a member of the Kharkiv Oblast Council of VIII convocation.
- Political party: Bloc Svitlychna Together!

Denys Skoryi (Ukrainian: Скорий Денис Ігоревич; born April 16, 1979) is a surgeon, oncologist, professor, and politician from Kharkiv, Ukraine. For almost 20 years, Skoryi has been working in different Ukrainian medical facilities as a physician, surgeon, oncologist, and manager. In 2016, he became one of the youngest regional medical facility CEOs in Ukraine, when he overhauled the Kharkiv Regional Center of Oncology. Skoryi gained notoriety and political weight, turning the facility to one of the best, pioneering state-of-the-art medical procedures, and cutting the facility’s original mortality rate by more than a factor of two by 2020. Skoryi accomplished this by raising additional public money for the Center from local businesses and inviting doctors from all over Ukraine to join his team. In 2020, Skoryi joined Bloc Svitlychna Together!, a political party led by Yuliya Svitlychna and was elected to the Kharkiv Oblast Council of VIII convocation in order to influence the distribution of government funds for regional medicine, including channeling more funding for the Regional Center of Oncology. In 2013 and 2014, Skoryi acquired international grants from the International Surgical Society and Japanese Hepato Biliary-Pancreatic Surgery Society. In 2015, Skoryi received the Saint Luke Medal, a medal awarded to leading Ukrainian physicians and surgeons.

From 2004 to 2008, Skoryi worked in the Central Hospital in Valky, Ukraine and the Institute of General and Urgent Surgery of the National Medical Academy of Ukraine (NMAU) in Kharkiv, Ukraine. From 2008 until 2016, Skoryi was a senior research fellow and leading researcher at the department of liver surgery of the Institute of General and Urgent Surgery of the NMAU. In 2013, Skoryi acquired his Doctor of Sciences degree. From 2016 and as of 2021, Skoryi is a professor at the oncology department of the Kharkiv National Medical University and the CEO of the Kharkiv Regional Center of Oncology.

== Personal life and family ==
Skoryi was born on April 16, 1979, in Kharkiv, Ukraine. He is married to Iryna Skora (Ukrainian: Ірина Володимирівна Скора). The couple has two daughters, Christina (Кристина) (born on 12 March 2019) and Vlada (Влада), and a son (born on 1 June 2022) whose name is unknown.

== Education ==
In 2002, Skoryi graduated with a bachelor's degree with honors from the Kharkiv National Medical University. From 2002 to 2004, Skoryi held an internship at the Institute of General and Urgent Surgery of the National Medical Academy of Ukraine (NMAU) (Ukrainian: Інститут загальної та невідкладної хірургії Академії Медичних Наук України) in Kharkiv and in the Central Hospital of Valky, Ukraine (distance education).

In 2008, Skoryi graduated early from the Institute of General and Urgent Surgery of the NMAU in Kharkiv, Ukraine. Upon his graduation, he acquired the Candidate of Sciences degree, which is the first of the two scientific degrees in some post-Soviet countries and may be recognized as the Doctor of Philosophy degree.

In 2013, Skoryi acquired his Doctorate in Sciences degree, which is a higher doctoral degree and the highest of the two scientific degrees in some post-Soviet countries.

== Career ==
=== Medical and teaching career (2004–present) ===
From 2004 to 2005, Skoryi worked as a surgeon in the Central Hospital in Valky, Ukraine. In 2005, he transferred to the Institute of General and Urgent Surgery of the National Medical Academy of Ukraine (NMAU) (Ukrainian: Інститут загальної та невідкладної хірургії Академії Медичних Наук України) in Kharkiv, Ukraine, where he worked in this capacity until 2008.

In 2008–2013, Skoryi was a senior research fellow and in 2013–2016, a leading researcher at the department of liver surgery of the Institute of General and Emergency Surgery of the NMAU. In 2011, Skoryi became a part of a medical team which was one of the first in Ukraine to perform bloodless surgeries on livers, split liver resections, extended and multivisceral liver resection. For these surgeries, the team invented a gas-jet surgical scalpel, which cuts the tissue with carbon dioxide.

From 2007 to 2015, Skoryi took part in various medical training courses in Ukraine and abroad, including Russia, China, Austria, Japan, Germany, and South Korea.

From 2016 and as of 2021, Skoryi teaches at the oncology academic department of the Kharkiv National Medical University and is a chief executive officer (CEO) of the municipal nonprofit Regional Center of Oncology (Ukrainian: КНП "Областний центр онкології") in Kharkiv.

From 2018, Skoryi was a chief researcher in the Ukrainian branch of the multinational pharmaceutical and biotechnology company AstraZeneca.

As of 2021, Skoryi co-authored and registered 12 medicinal patents, published 111 scientific articles in medical periodicals, and released 4 monographs.

=== CEO of the Kharkiv Regional Oncology Center (2016–present) ===
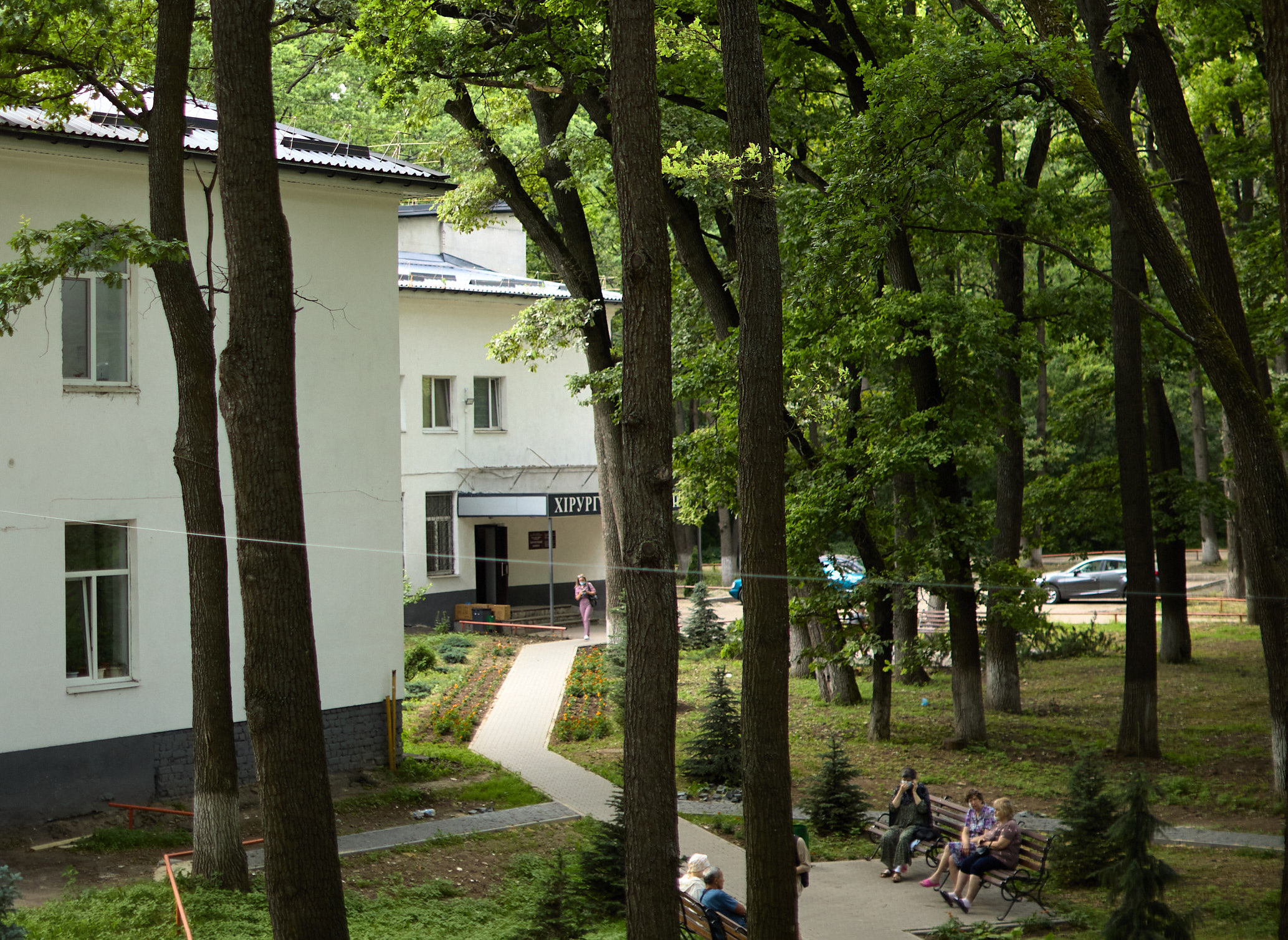
Kharkiv Regional Oncology Center, 2021

==== Appointment to the position ====
The Kharkiv Regional Center of Oncology (Ukrainian: КНП "Областний центр онкології") is a medical facility in Kharkiv that provides medical services for cancer patients.

In 2016, an inspection from Kharkiv Oblast Council (Kharkiv Regional Council) stated that the Center was in "emergency condition"; its management was corrupt and provided dubious medical care. The previous management was fired and the Center was reorganized as a municipal nonprofit enterprise under the name of the Regional Center of Oncology.

Through voting of the Kharkiv Oblast Council, Skoryi was elected the new CEO of the Center. He was elected for a 5-year term and became one of the youngest regional medical facility CEOs in Ukraine. He brought a new team of doctors with him to occupy managerial and other positions.

When the new team came to manage the Regional Oncology Center, two of its hospital buildings were reported as half destroyed and in need of a complete renovation. The Center lacked modern medical equipment. At the time, the medical facility was considered the worst of Ukrainian oncology centers.

==== Funding issues and political opposition ====
In 2016, when the Kharkiv Oblast Council reorganized the old Oncological Center into the Regional Center of Oncology, they promised to support the new facility on an administrative level and provide funds for its further development.

Since 2017, the Kharkiv regional government funded the staff's wages, hospital's utilities, and maintenance of the facility. As time passed, the management of the Center did not get any additional government funding to pay for buildings renovations or new equipment. Instead of providing support, regional authorities sent numerous inspections to check the facility, which interfered with the hospital's workflow and did not result in any positive changes. According to Skoryi, this and other regional authorities' actions towards the Center, such as delays in wages and in providing other promised funds, were signs of intentional pressure from the local government. On the other hand, the Healthcare Department of the Kharkiv Oblast Council stated they were doing enough to support the facility, their inspections were focused on benefitting the establishment in the future, and the hospital's management would not cooperate.

Skoryi and his team maintained and developed the new facility with the help of some non-governmental funds donated by public organizations, volunteers, and other Ukrainian doctors and medical facilities. The Regional Oncology Center's management opened new departments to create adequate surgical and research areas and patients' wards. Skoryi's team formed the facility's International Board of Trustees, which included several members of public organizations.

Eventually, the local authorities provided some additional funding to the facility. The moneys were allocated to the Center through a 2017 tender in order to do partial renovations in one of the Center's buildings. The regional authorities also voiced their plans to fund other renovations with the help of the European Investment Bank. However, later the Center was extracted from the list of facilities for renovation due to unprovided necessary documentation, although according to Skoryi all the necessary documentation was in fact provided.

In 2020, the Oncology Center's main source of funding was the Ukrainian National Healthcare Service (Ukrainian: Національна служба здоров'я України) as well as donations from volunteers, public organizations, private companies and medical workers and facilities.

In addition to other issues, on several occasions, the new management was hindered by the Healthcare Department of the Kharkiv Oblast Council (Ukrainian: Департамент Охорони Здоров'я Харківської Обласної Державної Адміністрації). They lobbied their own managers for the Center's authority body and would not cooperate on the coordination of the facility's schedule. In November 2017, a new bill was passed by Verkhovna Rada of Ukrainian (Parliament of Ukraine), which allowed hospital administrators to manage their facilities on their own. In particular, they were allowed to personally coordinate the hospital schedule, hire or fire people, as well as to control wages, and so on. Nevertheless, these activities could still be partially overseen by regional government. Thus, while most of the other hospital directors received freedom in their facilities, the Healthcare Department still attempted to interfere with Skoryi's activity as Center's director.

In connection to all of these issues, Skoryi was in open conflict with the Kharkiv Regional Council's Healthcare Department and led active discussions and negotiations with them in regard to his facility all through 2017. In his fight, he received strong support from Ukrainian politician, lawyer, and at the time National Deputy of the Healthcare Department of Verkhovna Rada, Iryna Sysoyenko and Governor of Kharkiv Oblast in 2016–2019, Yuliya Svitlychna.

==== Regional Oncology Center's development and achievements (2016–present) ====
Under Skoryi's management, the Regional Oncology Center team adopted internationally acclaimed treatment and workflow principles and medical protocols. Its patients started to receive modern and individual treatment and prescriptions. The new team started to work in partnership with international oncology establishments and specialists and to perform some unique and complex surgeries in Ukraine, some being a rare practice even for international facilities. They also started to receive invitations to perform surgeries abroad.

In 2017, for the first time in Ukrainian history, to conceal post-surgical defects on patient's thorax, the Regional Center of Oncology team replaced the defect with a special metallic construction and moved a part of a back muscle (without cutting it out) and skin tissue from patient's back to his chest. Also in 2017, the Regional Center of Oncology team invented and were the first in the world to use the new methodology of the transcaval access to the inferior vena cava (a large vein that carries the deoxygenated blood from the lower and middle body into the right atrium of the heart). The new methodology consisted of crossing the vein below the place affected by a tumor, lift it up, and cut out the tumor. The methodology was invented in order to avoid prosthetics of the inferior vena cava during the surgical removal of tumors. In this particular surgery, the method also helped save patient's kidney and nerves, that are responsible for pelvic movements.

In first four months in charge of the new facility, Skoryi and his team opened several new hospital departments, including the department of hepato-pancreato-biliary surgery (which focuses on medical procedures related to liver, pancreas, and biliary tract), department of anesthesiology, and an intensive care unit. They created new surgery rooms, the department of diagnosis, and reorganized administrative departments. The facility's medical equipment was also modernized. From January to May 2017, the Center enrolled 6,096 patients and the staff performed 1,041 surgeries, meanwhile the post-surgical mortality dropped almost by half. By November 2017, overall hospital mortality dropped by 40%.

In summer 2017, the Center of Oncology joined an online project "Available Medicine" (Ukrainian: Є ліки) created in partnership with Ukrainian activists, international fund "Revival", and the United Nations Development Program in Ukraine. The project is a website which posts lists of medications provided by the government funding and available in Ukrainian medical care facilities for free.

In 2018, 18,000 patients received treatment in the Center and 4,000 surgeries were performed.

During the COVID-19 pandemic in 2020, the Regional Center of Oncology became one of the few medical facilities in Kharkiv to build new "oxygen track" (a mechanical system, that provides oxygen to patients via special equipment) to replace those being in operation for the past 10 years. The oxygen track is usually used for providing oxygen to patients, who are still partially able to breathe on their own. This step is taken prior to patient's connection to artificial lung ventilation machine. Skoryi started the project to provide necessary medical care, if needed, to his cancer patients. According to statistics, cancer patients are more likely to get infected by the COVID-19 virus and develop a range of life-threatening complications. That same year, free COVID-19 tests were provided for the Center's patients and medical staff. It was provided within the Ukrainian Federation Against Cancer (Ukrainian: Українська Федерація Боротьби Проти Раку) project funded by private medical clinic.

Within three and a half years of the new management's work, hospital mortality has decreased by more than a factor of two. The number of surgeries, including the more complex ones and the ones never done before increased by 1.5 times. By 2020, the management started working according to international cancer diagnostics and treatment principals. This included creation of the interdisciplinary teams to research and treat oncology pathologies of liver, pancreas, stomach, colon and rectum, thoracic cavity organs, breasts, head and neck, and reproductive organs, skin and other. Such commissions usually consist of a surgeon, chemotherapist (doctor who treats cancer with anti-cancer drugs), oncologist, radiation therapist, radiation oncologist, and pathologist. The material and technical foundation of the facility increased by eight times.

==== Oncology Center's global reconstruction (2018–2020) ====
Starting in 2017, Skoryi lobbied for the global reconstruction of the two Oncology Center's old buildings as well as for construction of the new modern building. In 2017, the Governor of Kharkiv Oblast at the time, Yuliya Svitlychna discussed the issues of the Center at Government of Ukraine meetings promoting its addition to the list of facilities, that would be reconstructed with the help of the European Investment Bank funding. She also helped Skoryi to stock the Center with some of the necessary equipment.

In 2018, the new decentralization law in Ukraine gave more power and recourses to local governments of the country. Thanks to this and Skoryi and Svitlychna's previous partnership and actions, the construction works for the new Oncology Center building were confirmed. It was considered to be a huge step towards creating more adequate space for patients and doctors as well as the development of a whole new medical complex. That year, in addition to funds provided to local authorities, Svitlychna promised to get funding for the new hospital building from general government budgets as well.

In December 2018, the construction works officially started for the new 4-story Oncology Center building. The construction works for the building were considered to be on "a very large scale," the building was planned to occupy 48,000 square meters (520,000 sq ft). At the same time, in one of the old buildings of the Center two reanimation facilities and new surgery rooms were in construction, and complete restoration of patients' wards was in action. Additionally, the Oncology Center team received some new equipment.

Through 2019, the foundation for the new building as well as renovations in the old buildings were concluded. However, in 2020 all construction works for the new building were frozen and the budget which was provided by the regional authorities was redirected to fund other regional matters. As of 2021, the construction works for the new building are postponed. Some call the future of the new Oncology Center building "unclear."

=== Political career ===
==== Kharkiv Oblast Council ====
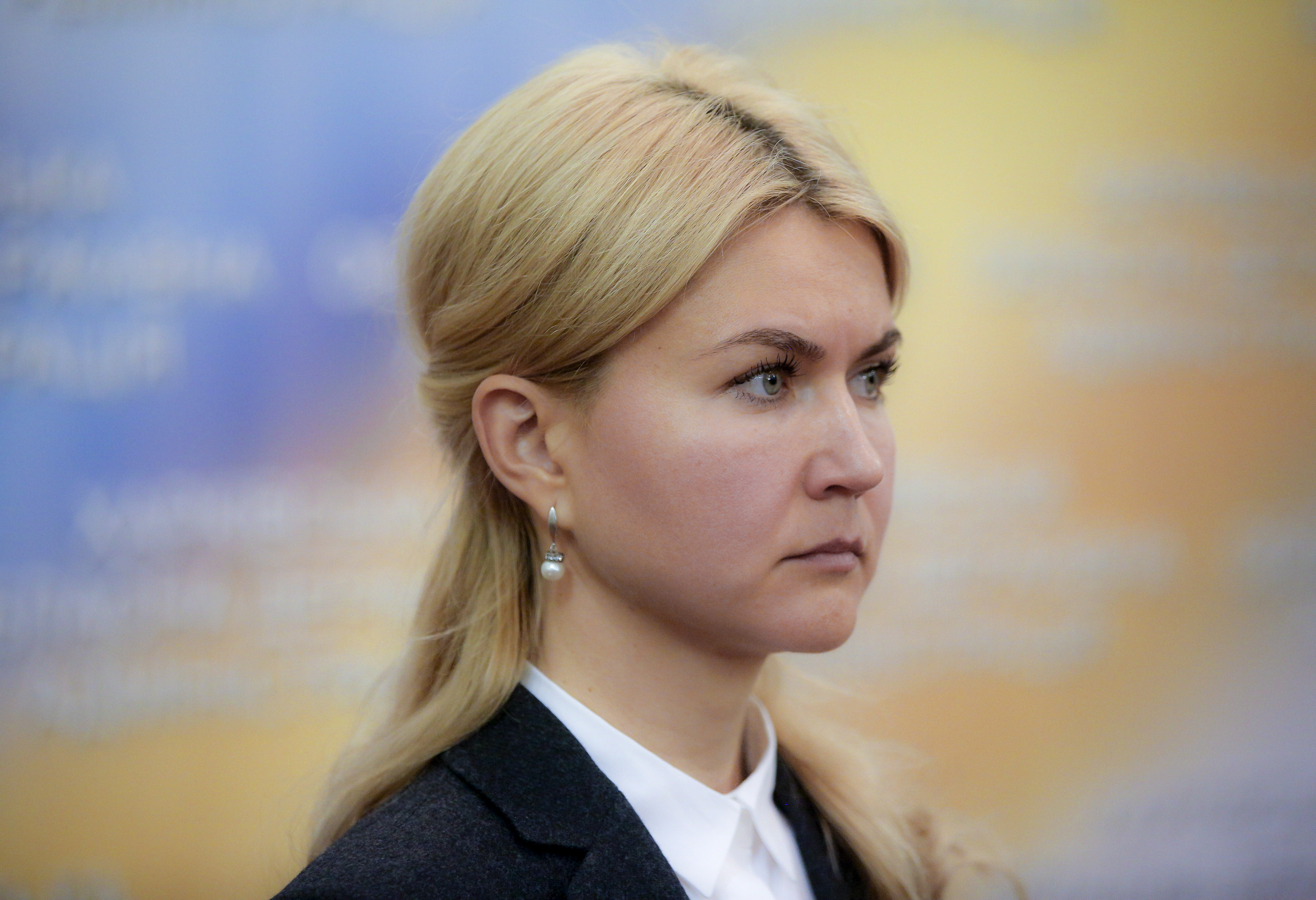
Yuliya Svitlychna, 2016

After the long-term partnership with Yuliya Svitlychna between 2017 and 2020, Skoryi became a part of her political party Bloc Svitlychna Together!. In 2020, Skoryi entered the Kharkiv Oblast (Kharkiv Regional) election as member of the Bloc Svitlychna Together! led by Yuliya Svitlychna. He stated he "did not see another way" to promote and make the improvements happen in his Oncology Center and in the Ukrainian medical industry overall. He stated one of his aims is to create adequate working conditions and options for development in the medical field for Ukrainian doctors (the majority of whom left their profession or fled the country due to intolerable working conditions).

During the 2020 Ukrainian local elections, Skoryi was elected one of 120 members of the Kharkiv Oblast Council of VIII convocation as a member of the Bloc Svitlychna Together!.

==== Initiatives ====
External videos
- Skoryi speaks in favor of early screening of prostate cancer, 2021, YouTube video

In 2021, Skoryi proposed to expand the regional healthcare program by adding a new system of free early screening tests for people without any symptoms in order to prevent the development of the colorectal cancer, breast cancer, and cervical cancer to life-threatening levels. As of 2021, the statistics shows that colorectal cancer is the most common type of oncology illnesses people have in the Kharkiv Oblast: out of 10,000 new cancer cases annually 1,400 are colorectal cancer patients. According to Skoryi, a new screening system could help drastically decrease the number of people with the neglected stage of the disease by detecting it in earlier stages. Skoryi's proposition to establish the new system was declined by other regional council members. Only 16 out of 96 present council members supported the initiative.

Another Skoryi idea, rejected by the regional council, was the establishment of the compact moving medical offices, a sort of "laboratory on the wheels." The idea was to provide free medical screening and timely health check-ups for people who live in small Ukrainian villages and towns, where people either can't or won't go to the hospital (which sometimes is situated in other locality) to get a check-up.

Despite these setbacks, as of 2021 Skoryi works on new strategies of lobbying these and other medical novelties. He and his team work on creating video guides to promote healthy lifestyle and encourage people to get early screening tests and get regular health check-ups.

== Awards and grants ==
=== National awards ===
- 2015: Skoryi received the Saint Luke Medal (Ukrainian: Орден Святого Луки), a medal to leading Ukrainian physicians and surgeons.

=== International awards and grants ===
- 2013: International Surgical Society Foundation Travel Scholarship Award
- 2014: Travel Grant of Japanese HepatoBiliary-Pancreatic Surgery Society

== See also ==
- Yuliya Svitlychna
- Iryna Sysoyenko
- Kharkiv Oblast Council
- Kharkiv National Medical University

== Literature cited ==
- "Har'kovskij Oblastnoj Centr Onkologii (Onkologicheskij centr)" Харьковский Областной Центр Онкологии (Онкологический центр) [Kharkiv Regional Oncology Center (Oncological Center)], kharkov.info (in Russian), Kharkiv: Har'kov Info
- Lobuzina, Kateryna (ed.), "Skoryj Denys Igorevych" Скорий Денис Ігоревич [Skoryi Denis Igorevich], Nauka Ukrai'ny: dostup do znan' Наука України: доступ до знань [Science of Ukraine: access to knowledge] (in Ukrainian), Kyiv: Vernadsky National Library of Ukraine
- "Skoryj Denys Igorevych" Скорий Денис Ігоревич [Skoryi Denis Igorevich], UAPATENTS.COM (in Ukrainian), Kyiv: Ukrainian Patents Database
- "Skoryj Denis Igorevich" Скорый Денис Игоревич [Skoryi Denis Igorevich], oblrada.kharkov.ua (in Russian), Kharkiv: Kharkiv Oblast Council, archived from the original on November 30, 2021
- "Orden Svjatitelja Luki – medikam Ukrainy" Орден Святителя Луки – медикам Украины [Order of St. Luke - for doctors of Ukraine], Medicinskij vestnik Медицинский вестник [Medical bulletin] (in Russian), no. 12, Simferopol: Medical Academy named after S.I. Georgievsky of Vernadsky CFU, June 1, 2011
- Ageeva, Julija, ed. (September 8, 2016), "Stalo izvestno, kto vozglavit Oblastnoj centr onkologii" Стало известно, кто возглавит Областной центр онкологии [It became known who will head the Regional Oncology Center], KHARKIV Today (in Russian), Kharkiv: Kharkiv Today
- Kolesnikova, Svetlana, ed. (September 8, 2016), "It became known who will head the Regional Oncology Center", allkharkov.ua, Kharkiv: All Kharkiv
- Andrijchenko, Dmytro, ed. (May 5, 2017), "V har'kovskom onkocentre proveli unikal'nuju operaciju" В харьковском онкоцентре провели уникальную операцию [A unique operation was performed in the Kharkiv oncology center], TSN.UA (in Russian), Kyiv: 1+1 Media Group
- Mihov, Andrej, ed. (May 25, 2017), "Har'kovskij oblastnoj klinicheskij onkologicheskij centr" Харьковский областной клинический онкологический центр [Kharkiv Regional Clinical Oncological Center], rakpobedim.com.ua (in Russian), Kharkiv: Centr "Ravnoe pravo na zhizn"
- Shvec, Aleksandr, ed. (May 26, 2017), "Aleksandr Golovko: "To, chto u menja chetvertaja stadija raka, vyjasnilos' sluchajno. V operacionnoj ja nahodilsja 14 chasov"" Александр Головко: "То, что у меня четвертая стадия рака, выяснилось случайно. В операционной я находился 14 часов" [Alexander Golovko: "The fact that I have the fourth stage of cancer was discovered by chance. I was in the operating room for 14 hours."], Fakty i Kommentarii Факты и комментарии [Facts and comments] (in Russian), no. 136 (4354), Kyiv: Bothain Consulting, ISSN 1606-5557, OCLC 1127159341
- Sokolova, Natasha, ed. (July 17, 2017), ""Je liky": har'kovchane smogut proverit' nalichie besplatnyh onkopreparatov v internete" "Є ліки": харьковчане смогут проверить наличие бесплатных онкопрепаратов в интернете ["E liky":Kharkiv residents will be able to check the availability of free cancer drugs on the Internet], Vgorode.ua (in Russian), Kyiv: UMH group
- Bigus, Denys, ed. (2018), "Skoryi Denys Ihorevych", Declarations, Kyiv: Bihus.Info, archived from the original on August 2, 2021
- "Avtobiografija kerivnyka" Автобіографія керівника [Autobiography of the chief], Kharkiv Onco (in Ukrainian), Kharkiv: Regional center of oncology, February 1, 2018
- "Obrani na vidpovidnyh vyborah deputaty miscevoi' rady" Обрані на відповідних виборах депутати місцевої ради [Deputies of the local council were elected at the relevant elections], Miscevi vybory Місцеві вибори [Local elections] (in Ukrainian), Kyiv: Central Election Commission (Ukraine), 2020
- Musayeva, Sevgil, ed. (April 30, 2020), "30 aprelja. No time to die: V Ukraine 10 tysjach inficirovannyh, v Rossii tysjachi smertej, v SShA million testov ezhenedel'no" 30 апреля. No time to die: В Украине 10 тысяч инфицированных, в России тысячи смертей, в США миллион тестов еженедельно [April 30. No time to die: There are 10 thousand infected in Ukraine, thousands of deaths in Russia, a million tests in the USA every week], Ukrayinska Pravda Українська правда [Ukrainian Pravda] (in Russian), Kyiv: Kyiv MediaHub, OCLC 1066371688
- Sokolova, Natasha, ed. (August 16, 2020), "Den'gi "srezali": v Har'kove zamorozili stroitel'stvo onkocentra" Деньги "срезали": в Харькове заморозили строительство онкоцентра [Money was "cut": The construction of an oncology center was frozen in Kharkov], Vgorode.ua (in Russian), Kyiv: UMH group
- "Vzhe mala buty zvedena budivlja, ale – ni. Zupynka budivnyctva onkocentru v Harkovi" Вже мала бути зведена будівля, але – ні. Зупинка будівництва онкоцентру в Харкові [The building should have already been erected, but have not. Stopping the construction of an oncology center in Kharkiv], VistiNews ВістіNews [NewsNews] (in Ukrainian), Kharkiv: Sluzhba novyn «VISTI», September 2, 2020
- Ivanov, Maksim, ed. (September 22, 2020), "Svetlichnaja predstavila svoju komandu na mestnyh vyborah" Светличная представила свою команду на местных выборах [Svetlichnaya represented her team in local elections], Comments.ua (in Russian), Kyiv: Komentari
- "Smertnost' snizilas' v dva raza: direktor Har'kovskogo onkologicheskogo centra rasskazal ob itogah trehletnej raboty" Смертность снизилась в два раза: директор Харьковского онкологического центра рассказал об итогах трехлетней работы [Mortality has decreased by half: the director of the Kharkiv Cancer Center spoke about the results of three years of work], mykharkov.info (in Russian), Kharkiv: Novosti Har'kova, September 25, 2020
- "Miscevi vybory 2020: hto jde u deputaty Harkivs'koi' oblrady" Місцеві вибори 2020: хто йде у депутати Харківської облради [Local elections 2020: who goes to the deputies of the Kharkiv regional council], Slobids'kyj kraj Слобідський край [Sloboda region] (in Ukrainian), Kharkiv: KP «Redakcija gazety „Slobids'kyj kraj“», October 1, 2020
- Fedorkova, Tat'jana, ed. (November 20, 2020), "Vybory do oblrady: TVK zarejestruvala shhe 65 deputativ, chetvero vidmovylys'" Вибори до облради: ТВК зареєструвала ще 65 депутатів, четверо відмовились [Regional Council elections: TEC registered another 65 deputies, four refused], mediaport.ua (in Ukrainian), Kharkiv: MediaPort
- Shapovalova, Juliana, ed. (December 17, 2020), "V kakie frakcii voshli deputaty Har'kovskogo oblsoveta 8 sozyva (spisok)" В какие фракции вошли депутаты Харьковского облсовета 8 созыва (список) [Which fractions included the deputies of the Kharkiv Regional Council of the 8th convocation (list)], Objektiv Объектив [Lens] (in Russian), Kharkiv: Media gruppa «Objektiv»
- "Pro nas" Про нас [About us], Oblasnij centr onkologії Обласний центр онкології [Regional center of oncology] (in Ukrainian), Kharkiv: Municipal non-profit enterprise "Regional Oncology Center", 2021
- Sokolova, Natasha, ed. (March 4, 2021), ""Odno iz pervyh mest po raku v Ukraine": Har'kovskij oblsovet otkazalsja sozdat' sistemu rannego vyjavlenija onkozabolevanij" "Одно из первых мест по раку в Украине": Харьковский облсовет отказался создать систему раннего выявления онкозаболеваний ["One of the first places in oncology in Ukraine": Kharkiv Regional Council refused to create a system for early detection of cancer], Vgorode.ua (in Russian), Kyiv: UMH group
- Sokolova, Natasha, ed. (April 16, 2021), "Besplatno: v Har'kove proverjat na koronavirus pacientov i medikov onkocentra" Бесплатно: в Харькове проверят на коронавирус пациентов и медиков онкоцентра [Free: Patients and doctors of the cancer center will be tested for coronavirus in Kharkiv], Vgorode.ua (in Russian), Kyiv: UMH group
- Sokolova, Natasha, ed. (April 17, 2021), "Gde i pochem: v kakih chastnyh klinikah Har'kova mozhno sdelat' test na koronavirus" Где и почем: в каких частных клиниках Харькова можно сделать тест на коронавирус [Where and how much: in which private clinicscan a coronavirus test be done in Kharkov], Vgorode.ua (in Russian), Kyiv: UMH group
- Belokudrja, Natal'ja (May 10, 2017), "Har'kovskie hirurgi dajut ljudjam vtoroj shans ili novaja zhizn' Har'kovskogo oblastnogo onkocentra" Харьковские хирурги дают людям второй шанс или новая жизнь Харьковского областного онкоцентра [Kharkiv surgeons give people a second chance or a new life of the Kharkiv Regional Cancer Center], Agentstvo Televidenija „Novosti“ Агентство Телевидения „Новости“ [Television agency "News"] (in Russian), Kharkiv: AO «Investor»
- Bychek, Alina (December 18, 2018), Sokolova, Natasha (ed.), "Kakim on budet: v Pomerkah strojat novyj onkocentr" Каким он будет: в Померках строят новый онкоцентр [What it will be like: a new cancer center is being built in Pomerki], Vgorode.ua (in Russian), Kyiv: UMH group
- Bychek, Alina (July 24, 2019), Sokolova, Natasha (ed.), "3 sekcii i 8 operacionnyh: kak v Har'kove strojat novyj onkologicheskij kompleks" 3 секции и 8 операционных: как в Харькове строят новый онкологический комплекс [3 sections and 8 operating rooms: how a new oncological complex is being built in Kharkov], Vgorode.ua (in Russian), Kyiv: UMH group
- Chernenko, Anna (August 30, 2020), Konsevich, Ol'ga (ed.), "Stroitel'stvo novoj onkobol'nicy v Har'kove ostanovilos': prichina" Строительство новой онкобольницы в Харькове остановилось: причина [The construction of a new cancer hospital in Kharkiv has stopped: the reason], 24 Kanal 24 Kанал [24 Channel] (in Russian), Kyiv: TRK «Ljuks»
- Fal'ko, Ol'ga (March 12, 2018), "Denis Skorij: Jakshho reformi ne zapracjujut', v ukraїns'kіj medicinі nastane defolt" Денис Скорий: Якщо реформи не запрацюють, в українській медицині настане дефолт [Denis Skory: If the reforms do not work, there will be a default in Ukrainian medicine], vz.kiev.ua (in Ukrainian), Kyiv: Vashe zdorov’ja
- Fedorkova, Tat'jana (May 31, 2017), Fedorkova, Tat'jana (ed.), "Pomerki" Померки [Pomerki], mediaport.ua (in Russian), Kharkiv: MediaPort
- Fedorkova, Tat'jana (February 10, 2018), Fedorkova, Tat'jana (ed.), "V HOGA obeshhajut postroit' novyj onkocentr" В ХОГА обещают построить новый онкоцентр [KHOGA promises to build a new cancer center], mediaport.ua (in Russian), Kharkiv: MediaPort
- Kochupalova, Vita; Mangova, Lidija (2008), Davydenko, M. (ed.), Litopys avtoreferativ dysertacij Літопис авторефератів дисертацій [Chronicle of dissertation synopses] (in Ukrainian), Kyiv: Ivan Fedorov Book Chamber of Ukraine
- Nagaevshhuk, Alena (November 20, 2017), Leptuga, Elena (ed.), "Lechat po-sovremennomu: chto izmenilos' v onkocentre" Лечат по-современному: что изменилось в онкоцентре [Cure in a modern way: what has changed in the oncology center], nakipelo.ua (in Russian), Kharkiv: GO "Har'kovskij Krizisnyj Infocentr"
- Naumov, Aleksej (March 4, 2021), Shapovalova, Juliana (ed.), "U 3-h chelovek v zale Har'kovskogo oblsoveta uzhe est' rak, u 15 – budet – Skoryj" У 3-х человек в зале Харьковского облсовета уже есть рак, у 15 – будет – Скорый [3 people in the hall of the Kharkiv Regional Council already have cancer, 15 will have - Skoryi], Objektiv Объектив [Lens] (in Russian), Kharkiv: Media gruppa «Objektiv»
- Nikolaeva, Marina (May 15, 2017), "Bor'ba za obnovlennyj onkocentr: skandal doshel do Kieva" Борьба за обновленный онкоцентр: скандал дошел до Киева [Fight for the updated cancer center: the scandal reached Kyiv], Agentstvo Televidenija „Novosti“ Агентство Телевидения „Новости“ [Television agency "News"] (in Russian), Kharkiv: AO «Investor»
- Pryluc'kyj, Sergij (October 22, 2020), "Jaki kandydaty i vid jakyh partij jdut' do mis'krady Harkova: povnyj spysok" Які кандидати і від яких партій йдуть до міськради Харкова: повний список [Which candidates and from which parties go to the Kharkiv City Council: a complete list], Apostrof Апостроф [Apostrophe] (in Ukrainian), Kyiv: International Centre for Policy Studies
- Shevchenko, Ol'ga (September 15, 2020), Shevchuk, Elena (ed.), "Denis Skoryj: «S komandoj Julii Svetlichnoj dostignem rezul'tatov»" Денис Скорый: «С командой Юлии Светличной достигнем результатов» [Denis Skoryi: "We will achieve results with the team of Yulia Svetlichnaya"], Vecherniy Kharkov Вечерний Харьков [Evening Kharkov] (in Russian), Kharkiv: OOO «Redakcija gazety «Vechernij Har'kov», OCLC 762014020
- Skoryi, Denis (2008), Kliniko-topografichne obgruntuvannja sposobiv miniinvazyvnogo likuvannja hvoryh na zhovchnokam'janu hvorobu Клініко-топографічне обгрунтування способів мініінвазивного лікування хворих на жовчнокам'яну хворобу [Clinical and topographic substantiation of methods of minimally invasive treatment of patients with gallstone disease], Kharkiv: Kharkiv National Medical University
- Sokolova, Ganna; Skyba-Jakubova, Ivanna (November 13, 2017), Musayeva, Sevgil (ed.), ""Zminyty lyshe vyvisku". Shho zagrozhuje avtonomizacii' likaren'" "Змінити лише вивіску". Що загрожує автономізації лікарень ["Change sign only". What threatens the autonomy of hospitals], Ukrayinska Pravda Українська правда [Ukrainian Pravda] (in Ukrainian), Kyiv: Kyiv MediaHub, OCLC 1066371688
- Strel'nik, Irina (March 30, 2021b), Shevchuk, Elena (ed.), "Neadekvatnye dejstvija oblastnoj vlasti usugubljajut situaciju na Har'kovshhine" Неадекватные действия областной власти усугубляют ситуацию на Харьковщине [Inadequate actions of the regional authorities exacerbate the situation in the Kharkiv region], Vecherniy Kharkov Вечерний Харьков [Evening Kharkov] (in Russian), Kharkiv: OOO «Redakcija gazety «Vechernij Har'kov», OCLC 762014020
- Strel'nik, Irina (April 8, 2021a), Shevchuk, Elena (ed.), "Denis Skoryj: Blok Svetlichnoj predlagaet vnedrjat' opyt razvityh stran" Денис Скорый: Блок Светличной предлагает внедрять опыт развитых стран [Denis Skoryi: The Svetlichnaya bloc proposes to introduce the experience of developed countries], Vecherniy Kharkov Вечерний Харьков [Evening Kharkov] (in Russian), Kharkiv: OOO «Redakcija gazety «Vechernij Har'kov», OCLC 762014020
- Stulen', Ekaterina (June 18, 2011), Guk, Ol'ga (ed.), "Ukrainskie mediki spasajut malyshej s porokami serdca i stavjat na nogi paralizovannyh" Украинские медики спасают малышей с пороками сердца и ставят на ноги парализованных [Ukrainian doctors save babies with heart defects and put paralyzed ones on their feet], Segodnya (in Russian), Kyiv: Media Group Ukraine, OCLC 899365656, archived from the original on August 2, 2021
