= Skakun =

Skakun (скакун) is an East Slavic surname. The word literally means "racehorse" or "jumper". Notable people with this surname include:

- Andriy Skakun (born 1994), Ukrainian footballer
- Galina Skakun (1943–2022), Belarusian cattle breeder and milkmaid
- Nataliya Skakun (born 1981), Ukrainian weightlifter
- Oleksandr Skakun (born 1973), Ukrainian politician
- Sergei Skakun (born 1970), Belarusian tennis player
- Vitalii Skakun (1996–2022), Ukrainian military engineer
