= Ihor Baluta =

Ukrainian pediatrician, businessman, and politician

- Ігор Балута
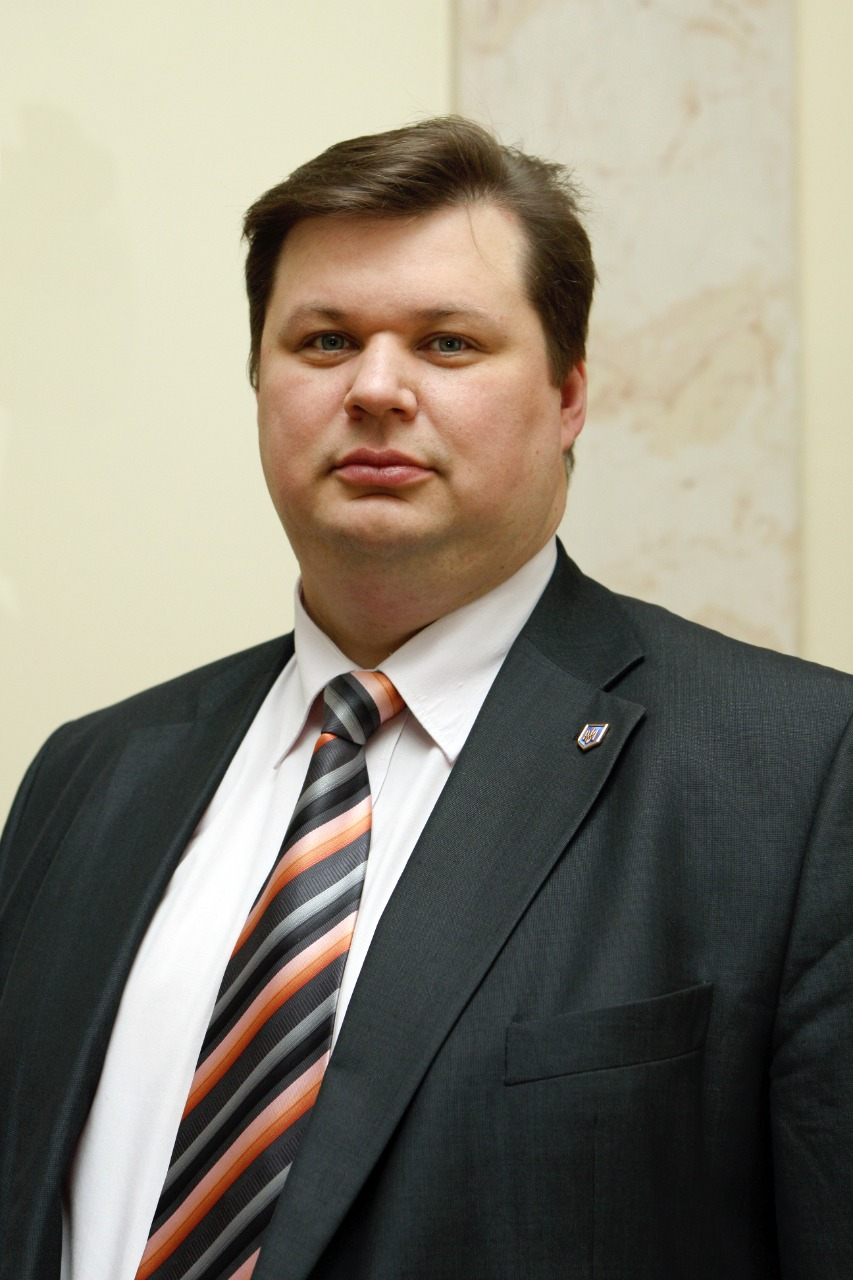

Governor of Kharkiv Oblast
- In office 2 March 2014 – 3 February 2015
- Preceded by: Mykhailo Dobkin
- Succeeded by: Ihor Raynin

Personal details
- Born: December 10, 1970 (age 55) Kharkiv, Ukrainian SSR, Soviet Union
- Party: Batkivshchyna until 2014
- Profession: Pediatrician

Ihor Myronovych Baluta (Ukrainian: Ігор Миронович Балута) is a Ukrainian pediatrician, businessman, Ukrainian politician and Governor of Kharkiv Oblast from March 2014 to February 2015.

== Biography ==
Baluta was born 9 July 1970 in Kharkiv. In 1993 he graduated from Kharkiv Medical Institute (specializing in pediatrics). From 1993 until 1998 he worked at a children's hospital in Kharkiv. Baluta was an assistant at the laboratory of Clinical Immunology and Allergology of the Kharkiv Research Institute of Microbiology and Immunology Department of the Academy of medical sciences of Ukraine in Kharkiv from early 1999 until early 2002. From 2002 until 2005 he was CEO of two commercial enterprises. Late 2004 he participated in the Orange Revolution. From April 2005 until September 2010 Baluta served as head of the main Directorate of labour and social protection of the population of Kharkiv Oblast (province).

In 2010 he was elected as a Deputy of the Kharkiv Oblast Council (for Batkivshchyna). In the 2012 Ukrainian parliamentary election Baluta was for Batkivshchyna in constituency 168 situated in Kharkiv. He finished second in this race with 29.34% (winner Valeriy Pysarenko of Party of Regions won with 43.44%).

On 2 March 2014 Baluta was appointed Governor of Kharkiv Oblast. At the time of his appointment Kharkiv Oblast was in uproar because of pro-Russian protests. On the day of his appointment on his Government office the Ukrainian flag was replaced with a Russian flag. Baluta's first public appearance was two days later when he spoke to a crowd of pro-EU demonstrators expressing his support for the new Yatsenyuk Government. From then until 13 April regional (Baluta's Government office the) state administration building was occupied multiple times by pro-Russians (until it became fully under Ukrainian control); accompanied by violent clashes between pro-Russian and pro-Ukrainian demonstrators. Kharkiv returned to relative calm by 30 April.

On 3 February 2015 President of Ukraine Petro Poroshenko replaced Baluta and appointed Ihor Raynin as governor in his place.

In the October 2015 Ukrainian local elections Baluta was a candidate for Mayor of Kharkiv for the party Volunteer Party of Ukraine. The election was won by incumbent Mayor Hennadiy Kernes.

In the October 2020 Ukrainian local elections Baluta was a candidate for the Kharkiv Oblast Council for the party Aktsent. He, nor his party, were elected to this regional parliament.

Political offices
| Preceded by Mykhailo Dobkin | Governor of Kharkiv Oblast; 2014-2015 | Succeeded by Ihor Rainin |
