= Oleh Syniehubov =

Ukrainian politician

- Олег Синєгубов
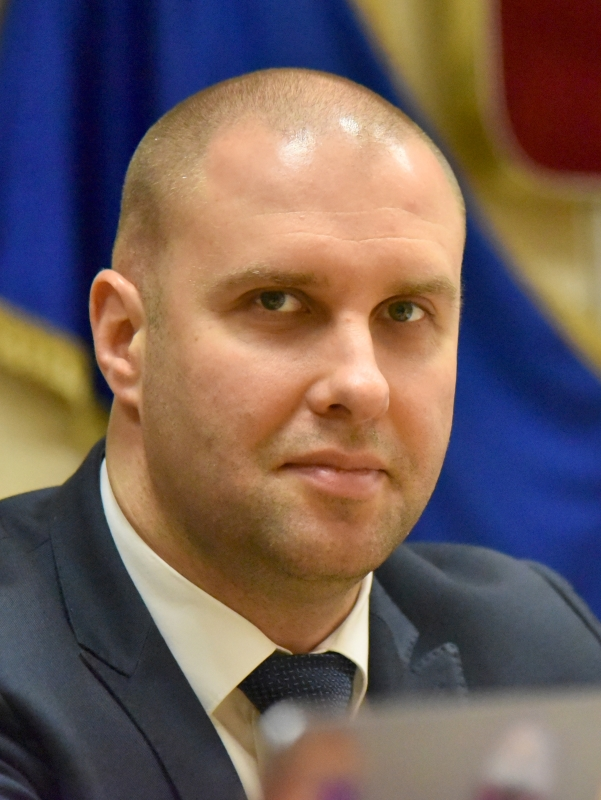
- Syniehubov in 2019

Governor of Kharkiv Oblast
- Incumbent
- Assumed office 24 December 2021
- Preceded by: Oleksandr Skakun

Governor of Poltava Oblast
- In office 11 November 2019 – 24 December 2021
- Preceded by: Oleh Pruhlo (acting)
- Succeeded by: Dmytro Lunin (acting)

Personal details
- Born: 10 August 1983 (age 43) Kharkov, Ukrainian SSR, Soviet Union (now Kharkiv, Ukraine)
- Party: Servant of the People
- Spouse: Anna Zhuravlyova
- Children: 1 son

Oleh Vasyliovych Syniehubov (Ukrainian: Олег Васильович Синєгубов; born 10 August 1983) is a Ukrainian lawyer, attorney, scientist and entrepreneur who is currently the Governor of Kharkiv Oblast (since 24 December 2021) after being Governor of Poltava Oblast (appointed on 11 November 2019). In the wake of the invasion of Ukraine by the Russian Federation on 24 February 2022, Syniehubov was appointed head of the Kharkiv Regional Civil-Military Administration (HOVA).

== Early life and education ==
Oleh Syniehubov was born on 10 August 1983 in Kharkov, Soviet Union (now Kharkiv, Ukraine). His father was an agronomist and his mother was an accountant. He attended Kharkiv secondary school № 147, before enrolling in the Faculty of Law at Kharkiv University of Internal Affairs in 2000. In 2004, he graduated with honors and qualified as a lawyer.

== Career ==
From July 2004 to May 2005 he worked as an investigator of the investigative department of the Ministry of Internal Affairs of Ukraine on the Southern Railway.

=== Academic (2005-2019) ===
From May 2005 to December 2007, he was an associate professor of Kharkiv National University of Internal Affairs.

From January 2008 to July 2008, he was the investigator of investigative branch of LV station "basis" of Regional Department of the Ministry of Internal Affairs of Ukraine on the Southern railway.

From August 2008 to March 2009, he was a senior lecturer of the Department of Civil Law, Institute of Law, Economics and Sociology, KhNUVS. From March 2009 to July 2011, he was an associate professor at the same department.

Between July 2011 and November 2015, he was the deputy dean for educational and methodological work of the Institute of Law and Mass Communications of KhNUVS. In 2013, he received the academic title of associate professor of civil law and procedure.

He is a doctor of law. In 2015, he defended his doctoral dissertation on "Exercise of personal non-property rights of minors."

Between November 2015 and October 2019, he became the dean of the Faculty № 6 KhNUVS.

In September 2016, he was the Deputy Chairman of the Specialized Academic Council with the right to accept for consideration, and defense of dissertations for the degree of Doctor (Candidate) of Law.

In 2018, Syniehubov was a candidate for the position of a judge of the Supreme Anti-Corruption Court of Ukraine, but did not pass the competitive selection.

In the 2019 Ukrainian parliamentary election for the Verkhovna Rada, Syniehubov was a proxy of the candidate from the Servant of the People party in the constituency - 180 developer from Oleksiy Krasov.

=== Governor of Poltava (2019-2021) ===
In October 2019, the Honcharuk Government approved Syniehubov's appointment as Governor of Poltava Oblast. On 11 November 2019, President Volodymyr Zelenskyy appointed Syniehubov as Governor.

=== Governor of Kharkiv (2021-present) ===
In December 2021, he was appointed Governor of Kharkiv Oblast.

=== Entrepreneurship ===
In addition to teaching and research, Syniehubov is also the owner of Seeds of Slobozhanshchyna LLC and Sinegubov, Sobolev & Partners LLC. He is a co-founder of several commercial enterprises, including: Vikata LLC, which is engaged in real estate transactions; Siboney Service LLC, whose activity is consulting on commercial activity and management, and the law firm Raskosov Loyes Group.

== Personal life ==
He has a wife, Anna Zhuravlyova, who works at the Department of Internal Medicine № 3 and Endocrinology of Kharkiv National Medical University.

They have a son, who was born in 2016.

Political offices
Preceded by Oleksandr Skakun; Acting	Governor of Kharkiv Oblast; 2021—	Succeeded by Incumbent
Preceded by Oleh Pruhlo; Acting	Governor of Poltava Oblast; 2019–2021	Succeeded by Dmytro Lunin; Acting
