= Ukrainian National Union (political party) =

Political party in Ukraine

Ukrainian National Union Український Національний Союз
- Abbreviation: UNU
- Leader: Vitaly Krivosheev
- Spokesperson: Oleg Goltvyansky
- Founded: December 19, 2009
- Merger of: Alliance of Patriotic Forces
- Headquarters: Kyiv; Kharkiv
- Ideology: Ukrainian nationalism; Ultranationalism
- Political position: Far-right

Party flag

Website
- www.naso.pp.ua

The Ukrainian National Union (Ukrainian: Український Національний Союз, romanized: Ukrainskyi Natsionalnyi Soiuz [ʊkrɐˈjinʲsʲkɪj nɐts⁽ʲ⁾ioˈnɑlʲnɪj soˈjuz]; abbreviated UNU) is a Ukrainian far-right organisation. It was founded in 2009 and was a member of Social-National Assembly until 2013.

== History ==
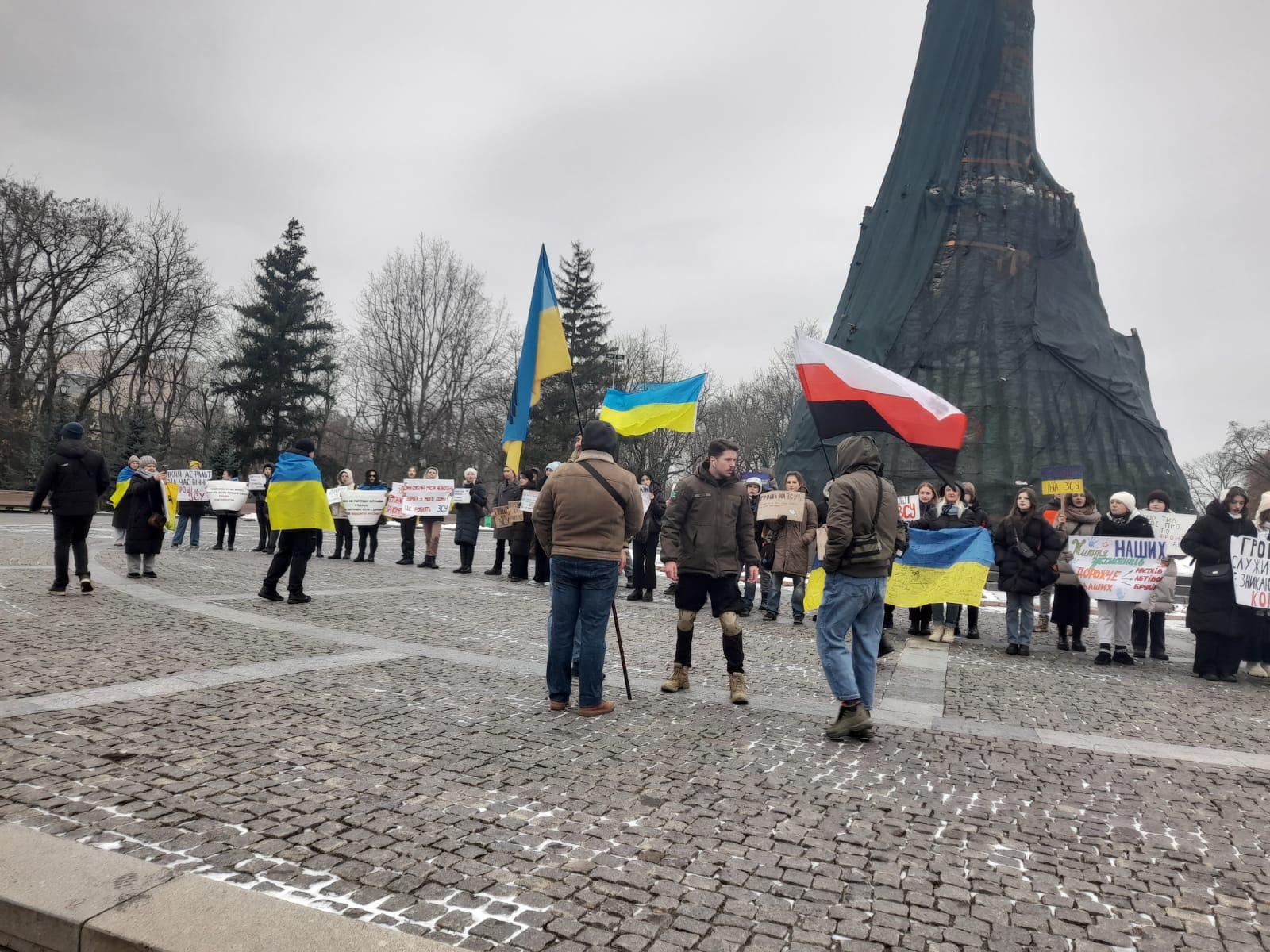
Rally: "Money for the Armed Forces of Ukraine!" in the center of Kharkiv. December 2023.

The UNU was founded on December 19, 2009. Its first branches were opened in the cities of Kharkiv, Poltava and Liubotyn. The leader of the UNU was Oleg Goltvyansky, until July 15, 2012, when he was replaced by incumbent Vitaly Krivosheev.

The UNU is an active organiser of political demonstrations, such as marches in Kyiv, Kharkiv and Poltava, done in honour of the Ukrainian Insurgent Army, and marches against illegal immigration in Kharkiv, amongst other activities.

The UNU often directs its activities against groups it perceives as hostile to the Ukrainian state, such as pro-Russian groups during the 2014 pro-Russian unrest in Ukraine and separatists in the War in Donbas.

On October 26, 2012, the UNU established of the paramilitary Alliance of Patriotic Forces.

On April 27, 2013, UNU leaders announced their intentions to create a Ukrainian Social-nationalist party. Until May 22, 2013, the UNU was a member of the Social-National Assembly.

The UNU was an organiser in the Euromaidan protests. During the 2014 Ukrainian revolution, UNU paramilitaries were active in street riots in Kyiv.

In March 2014, Vitaly Krivosheev and Artem Golovko were arrested by the Russian Federal Security Service in Rostov Oblast. According to Russian media, the pair were accused of planning terrorist attacks and acts of sabotage in Russian territory.

Members of the UNU's paramilitary were active in the War in Donbas, On the basis of the Ukrainian National Union was created by the battalion "Pechersk". until it disbanded in the winter of 2015, after the battles in the Luhansk region. In the elections in 2015 members of the movement were part of the Ukrainian Association of Patriots UKROP coalition. Oleg Goltvyansky won the elections and became a deputy of the Lyubotyn City Council. Vitaly Krivosheev could not win the elections to the Kharkiv Regional Council in the 8th constituency. In 2020–2021 the organization took a wide part in actions against the increase in utility tariffs. In 2021 due to a series of UNU mass actions in Kharkiv Aina Tymchuk, the governor of the Kharkiv region, was dismissed on charges of corruption and ties with Russia. In winter in 2022 protests against the director of the National Bank of Ukraine Kirill Shevchenko began in Kyiv.
