= Pechersk Battalion =

«Pechersk» Battalion (June 2014 – present)
- Батальйон «Печерськ»
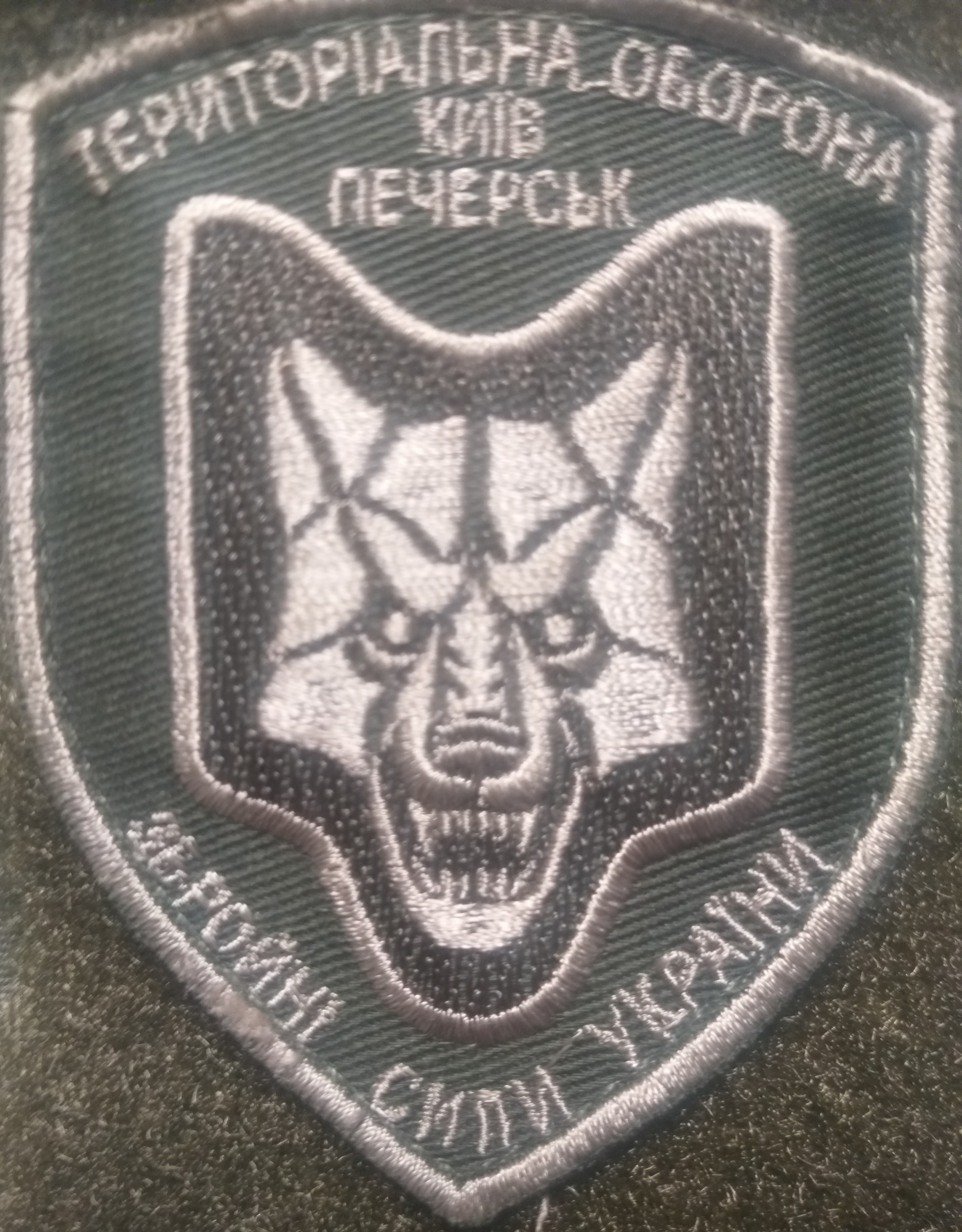
- Battalion SSI
- Founded: 2014
- Country: Ukraine
- Role: Assault unit
- Size: <100 (in September 2014)

Commanders
- Notable commanders: Oleg Goltvyansky

«Pechersk» Battalion" (Батальйон «Печерськ») is a volunteer Ukrainian armed formation that took part in the war in eastern Ukraine.

== History ==
The battalion was created on the basis of activists of the Ukrainian socio-political organization «Ukrainian National Union», «Self-defense of the Pechersk district of Kiev», public organization «Fashionable sentence»"", the battalion included ultras of FC Dynamo Kyiv, Metalist Kharkov, CSKA Kyiv and others, and recruitment of new volunteers was also carried out.

=== Participation in combat operations ===
At the beginning of September 2014 there were a hundred battalion fighters at the front. The unit's fighters fought with captured weapons, including those seized in battles near Luhansk. The unit appealed to the Minister of Defense of Ukraine Valeriy Heletei with a request to grant it official status and provide weapons. As a result, part of the battalion was transferred to the 12th territorial defense battalion. As of 19.09.2014, the battalion's servicemen were serving at 4 checkpoints in several districts of the Luhansk region. At the end of December 2014 the unit was disarmed and withdrawn from the combat zone.

== Command ==
- Captain Ihor Valeriyovych Pavnov† (June 2014)
- Lieutenant Oleg Goltvyansky (June-December 2014)
- Captain Ihor Mykhailovych Yakymchuk (December 2014 - March 2015)
- Lieutenant Oleg Goltvyansky (2019 - 2021)
