= Aina Tymchuk =

Ukrainian politician

Aina Tymchuk Айна Тимчук
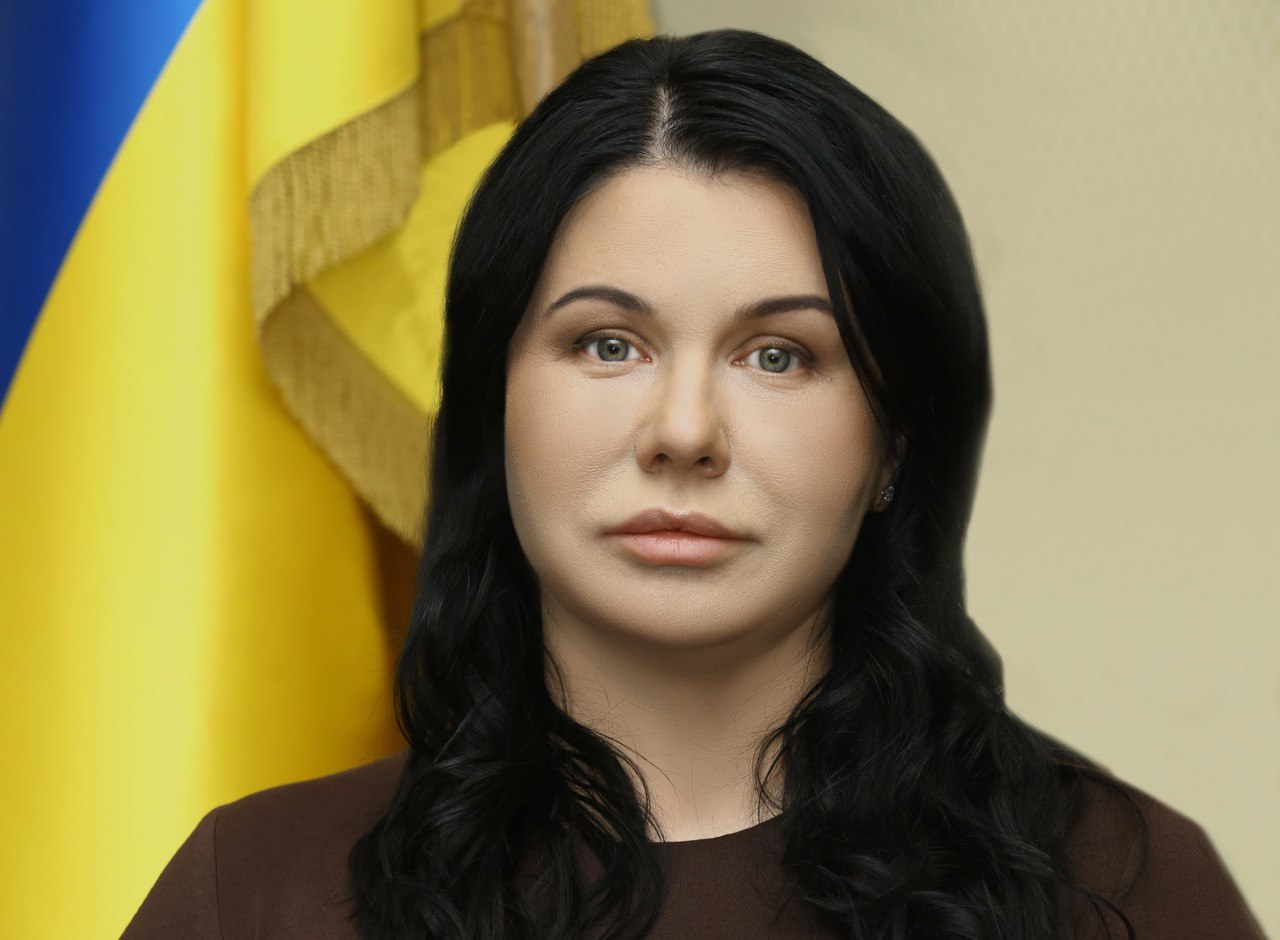

12th Governor of Kharkiv Oblast
- In office 27 November 2020 – 11 August 2021
- President: Volodymyr Zelenskyy
- Preceded by: Oleksiy Kucher
- Succeeded by: Oleksandr Skakun (acting)

Personal details
- Born: 21 November 1973 (age 52) Dnipro, Ukrainian SSR, Soviet Union

Aina Leonidivna Tymchuk (Ukrainian: Айна Леонідівна Тимчук; born on 21 November 1973) is a Ukrainian politician who was Governor of Kharkiv Oblast from 27 November 2020 until 11 August 2021.

== Biography ==
Tymchuk was born 21 November 1973 in Dnipropetrovsk (current Dnipro). In 2004 she graduated from the Dnipropetrovsk Regional Institute of Public Administration of the National Academy of Public Administration under the President of Ukraine with a degree in Public Administration, Master of Public Administration.

From February 2004 to April 2010 Tymchuk worked as a civil servant in the Dnipropetrovsk Oblast regional administration. In August 2010 she moved to Kharkiv to work first (until November 2010) as an adviser to Kharkiv Mayor Hennadiy Kernes on organizational issues and then from November 2010 until March 2014 she was Kernes's Deputy Mayor and Manager of the Executive Committee of the Kharkiv City Council.

In March 2014 she moved back to the Dnipropetrovsk Oblast regional administration where she became first (March 2014 - January 2018) Deputy Chief of Staff of the Dnipropetrovsk Regional State Administration and then from November 2020 Chief of Staff.

The Ukrainian National Union accused Aina Tymchuk in corruption and connection with separatists and held a number of meetings in Kharkiv in summer 2021.

On 27 November 2020 Ukrainian president Volodymyr Zelenskyy appointed Tymchuk Governor of Kharkiv Oblast. On 11 August 2021 Zelenskyy dismissed Tymchuk from this post after she had tendered her resignation.

Political offices
Preceded by Oleksiy Kucher	Governor of Kharkiv Oblast; 2020-2021	Succeeded by Oleksandr Skakun (acting)
