= Andriy Bohdan =

Ukrainian lawyer (born 1976)

- Андрій Богдан
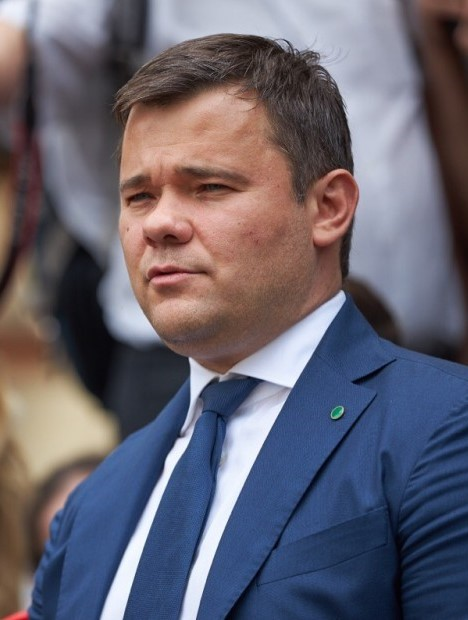
- Bohdan in 2019

Head of the Office of the President of Ukraine
- In office 21 May 2019 – 11 February 2020
- President: Volodymyr Zelenskyy
- Preceded by: Ihor Rainin
- Succeeded by: Andriy Yermak

Personal details
- Born: 3 December 1976 (age 49) Lviv, Ukrainian SSR, USSR
- Party: Independent
- Education: University of Lviv
- Profession: Lawyer, politician, anti-corruption specialist
- Awards: Honored Lawyer of Ukraine (2007)

Andriy Yosypovych Bohdan (Ukrainian: Андрій Йосипович Богдан; born 3 December 1976) is a Ukrainian lawyer and former Head of the Presidential Administration. On 21 May 2019, President Volodymyr Zelenskyy appointed Bohdan to lead the office. He was responsible for communication, as well as legal and political issues. Zelenskyy dismissed him on 11 February 2020. Previously, he was also the personal lawyer of oligarch Ihor Kolomoisky.

In 2007, Bohdan was granted the title Honored Lawyer of Ukraine.

== Biography ==
=== Education ===
Bohdan studied law and economics at the Lviv University. He received an academic degree (candidate of science) of juridical sciences (Doctor of Law).

=== Career ===
In the 2007 Ukrainian parliamentary election, Bohdan was candidate for People's Deputy from the Our Ukraine–People's Self-Defense Bloc, at number 93 on the list. At election time, he was a managing partner of the law firm "Legal Counsel Lawyers". He was not elected, but following the election, he became an assistant to MP Andrey Portnov of the Yulia Tymoshenko Bloc.

Bohdan was Deputy Minister of Justice from 2007 to 2010. In 2010 he was appointed Deputy Minister of the Cabinet of Ministers. Bohdan worked as the Government Commissioner for Anti-corruption Policy of the first and second Azarov Government terms (2010–2014).

In the 2014 Ukrainian parliamentary election Bohdan was again a candidate for People's Deputy in the Petro Poroshenko Bloc, at number 74 on the national list. At election time, he was a jurisconsult of the law firm "Status". Although the Petro Poroshenko Bloc won 132 seats in the election, only 63 of those seats were won on its national list (the other seats were won in constituencies). Following the election, Bohdan worked as the adviser to the Governor of Dnipropetrovsk Oblast Ihor Kolomoyskyi, and represented him as lawyer in the legal disputes over Privatbank.

On 21 May 2019, President Volodymyr Zelenskyy appointed Bohdan Head of the Presidential Administration. Within four days, 25,000 Ukrainians signed an electronic petition for the dismissal of Bohdan from this post claiming he could not have been appointed because he falls under Lustration laws because of his work for the Azarov Government. The head of the Public Council on lustration issues at the Justice Ministry, Tetyana Kozachenko, also claimed on 22 May 2019 that Zelenskyy's appointment of Bohdan violated the legislation on lustration.

On 2 August 2019, Interfax-Ukraine reported that Bohdan had filed his resignation letter the previous day. The same day, President Zelenskyy stated that he had not signed Bohdan's resignation letter and claimed that "all the people who came with me" had signed resignation letters in advance so they could be removed from their post when "society or president feels that this or that person fails to cope with the goals set for Ukraine."

In December 2019, Bohdan was included in the list of the 100 most influential Ukrainians by Focus magazine, taking second place.

Zelenskyy dismissed Bohdan as Head of his presidential administration on 11 February 2020. He was immediately replaced by Andriy Yermak.

== Investigations ==
Bohdan was involved in a criminal case by the GPU, he is suspected of influencing court decisions, according to which Ukraine was obliged to pay Russia ₴3.2 billion under the guarantees of the United Energy Systems company. Draft notifications of suspicions were prepared in the case, but the GPU leadership blocked further investigation. In December 2019, a lawsuit was opened against Bohdan by Mykhailo Nonyak, the former head of Ukrtransbezpeky. Nonyak asked that Bohdan's demand to bring him to justice and his subsequent dismissal be declared illegal.

In addition, on 19–20 November 2019, the anonymous Telegram Channel "Trumpet Breakthrough" began publishing recordings from the office of the Director of the State Bureau of Investigation Roman Truba, the content of which showed that the bureau was fulfilling political orders. One such order was from the head of the Office of the President of Ukraine, Andriy Bohdan, regarding the illegal persecution of the fifth President of Ukraine (Petro Poroshenko) and members of his team.

=== Journalistic investigations ===
In June 2019, the investigative journalism show "Our Money with Denys Bihus" (Ukrainian: “Наші гроші з Денисом Бігусом”) discovered that Bohdan is involved in offshore financial operations, which engaged in credit scams worth hundreds of millions of hryvnia. He owns an estate in Kyiv's Koncha-Zaspa neighbourhood, and large plots of land in Kyiv Oblast, which he bought while working in the civil service. Journalists claim that Bohdan advised others on how to carry out credit fraud.

=== Sanctions by Zelenskyy ===
On May 2, 2026, Volodymyr Zelenskyy imposed sanctions on Bohdan that will remain in effect for 10 years, claiming that his actions endangered “the national interests, security, sovereignty, and territorial integrity of Ukraine,” without providing further justification. The sanctions include: revocation of Ukrainian state awards, asset freezes, suspension of commercial transactions, prevention of capital outflows from Ukraine, revocation or suspension of licenses and other permits, and a ban on participation in the privatization and leasing of state property. On Facebook, Bohdan speculated that Zelenskyy was trying to divert attention from the corruption scandal involving Timur Mindich, regarding which new audio recordings had been published in the media.

== Personal life ==
His father is Bohdan Yosyp Hnatovych (Associate Professor of Civil Law and Procedure of Lviv National University). He has been dating Anastasia Slichna (since 2018). Bohdan is a Greek Catholic.

== See also ==
- Trump–Ukraine scandal

Political offices
Preceded by Ihor Rainin	Head of the Office of the President of Ukraine; 2019–2020	Succeeded by Andriy Yermak
