= Ihor Rainin =

Ukrainian politician (born 1973)

- Ігор Райнін
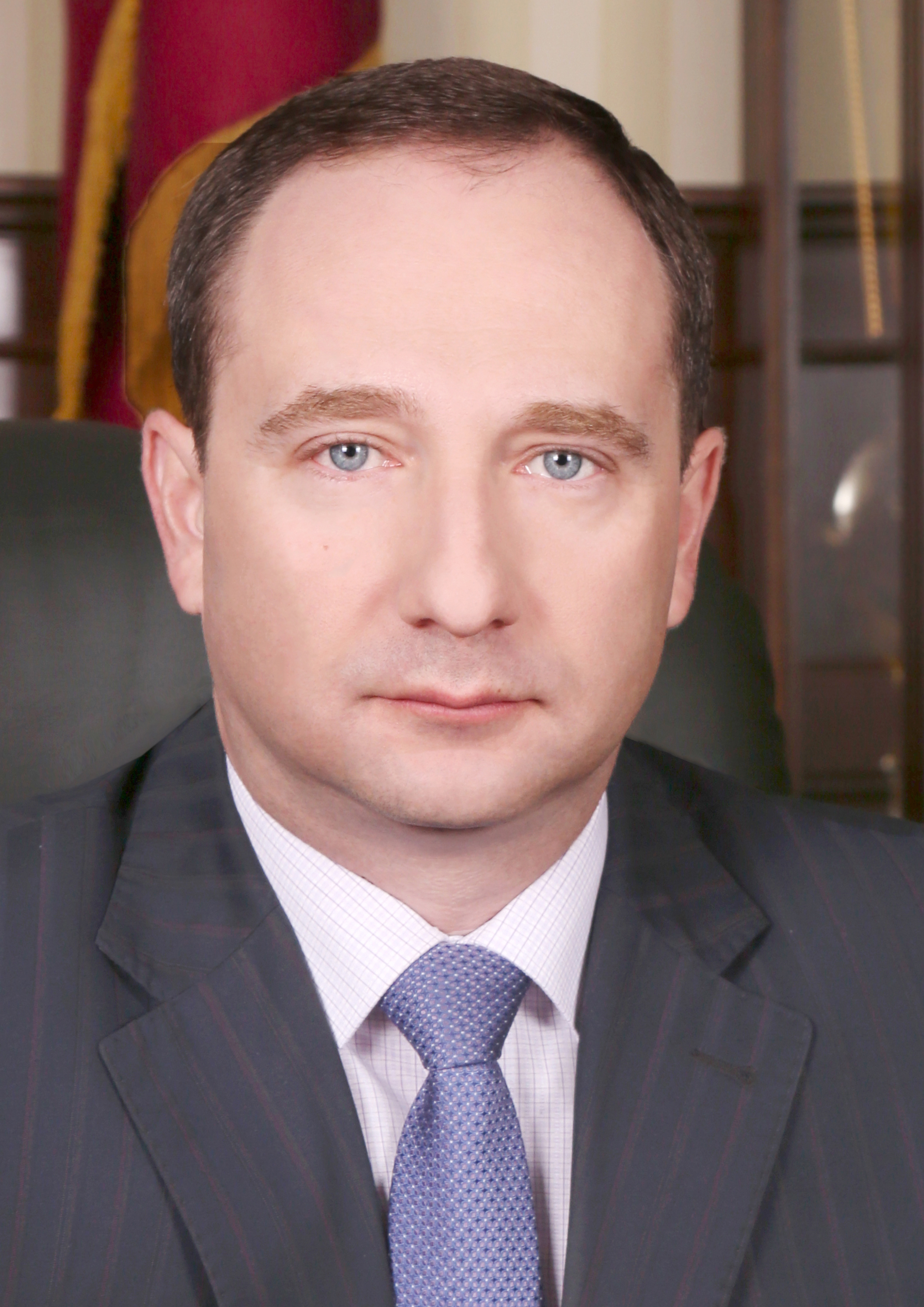
- Rainin in 2015

Head of the Presidential Administration of Ukraine
- In office 29 August 2016 – 19 May 2019
- President: Petro Poroshenko
- Preceded by: Boris Lozhkin
- Succeeded by: Andriy Bohdan

Governor of Kharkiv Oblast
- In office 3 February 2015 – 29 August 2016
- Preceded by: Ihor Baluta
- Succeeded by: Yuliya Svitlychna

Personal details
- Born: 6 August 1973 (age 53) Kharkiv, Ukrainian SSR, Soviet Union
- Party: Opposition Platform — For Life (2019–2022)
- Other political affiliations: Petro Poroshenko Bloc; (2015–2019); Batkivshchyna; (2010–2014)

Ihor Lvovych Rainin (alternatively Raynin; Ukrainian: Ігор Львович Райнін; born 6 August 1973) is a Ukrainian politician who served as governor of Kharkiv Oblast from 2015 to August 2016. On 29 August 2016, he was promoted to head the Presidential Administration of Ukraine. Under a presidential decrees signed on 21 May 2019, he was dismissed by new President Volodymyr Zelenskyy.

== Biography ==
In 1997 Rainin graduated from the Kharkiv Aviation Institute, as an engineer. Rainin started his professional life with various job in the engineering field before 2000. In 2000, he graduated from the Kharkiv branch of the Ukrainian Academy of Public Administration under the President of Ukraine. He then had various leading civil service positions in the Kharkiv Oblast administration. From June 2010 till March 2014 Rainin was deputy director of the company "Sintofleks" (located in Kharkiv).

In the 2010 Ukrainian local elections Rainin was elected deputy of the Kharkiv Regional (Oblast) Council (parliament) for the party (of which he also was a member of) "Fatherland". He was placed 8th on the ballot. Rainin became first deputy head of the faction of this party. And he eventually on 20 October 2014 became head of the parliamentary group "Unity of Kharkiv". Having served as deputy chairman of the Kharkiv Regional State Administration from March 2014, he was appointed first deputy chairman the following month. In November 2014, he became a deputy head of Petro Poroshenko's presidential administration. Poroshenko appointed Rainin governor of Kharkiv Oblast on 3 February 2015. Late February 2015 Rainin also became the head of the Kharkiv Oblast branch of the Petro Poroshenko Bloc. In the October 2015 Ukrainian local elections Rainin was elected to the Kharkiv Oblast Council. On 29 Aug 2016 Poroshenko promoted Rainin to head his Presidential Administration. Since Oblast Councils members are able to combine their duties with other work, Rainin kept his seat in the Kharkiv Oblast Council. Under a presidential decree signed on 21 May 2019 he was dismissed as head of the Presidential Administration by new President Volodymyr Zelenskyy who appointed Andriy Bohdan in his place.

On 27 November 2019, Rainin was appointed chairman of the Kharkiv Oblast branch of the Opposition Platform — For Life party.

Political offices
Preceded by Boris Lozhkin	Head of the Presidential Administration; 2016–2019	Succeeded by Andriy Bohdan
Preceded by Ihor Baluta	Governor of Kharkiv Oblast; 2015-2016	Succeeded by Yuliya Svitlychna
