= Oleksandr Skakun =

Ukrainian politician

- Олександр Скакун
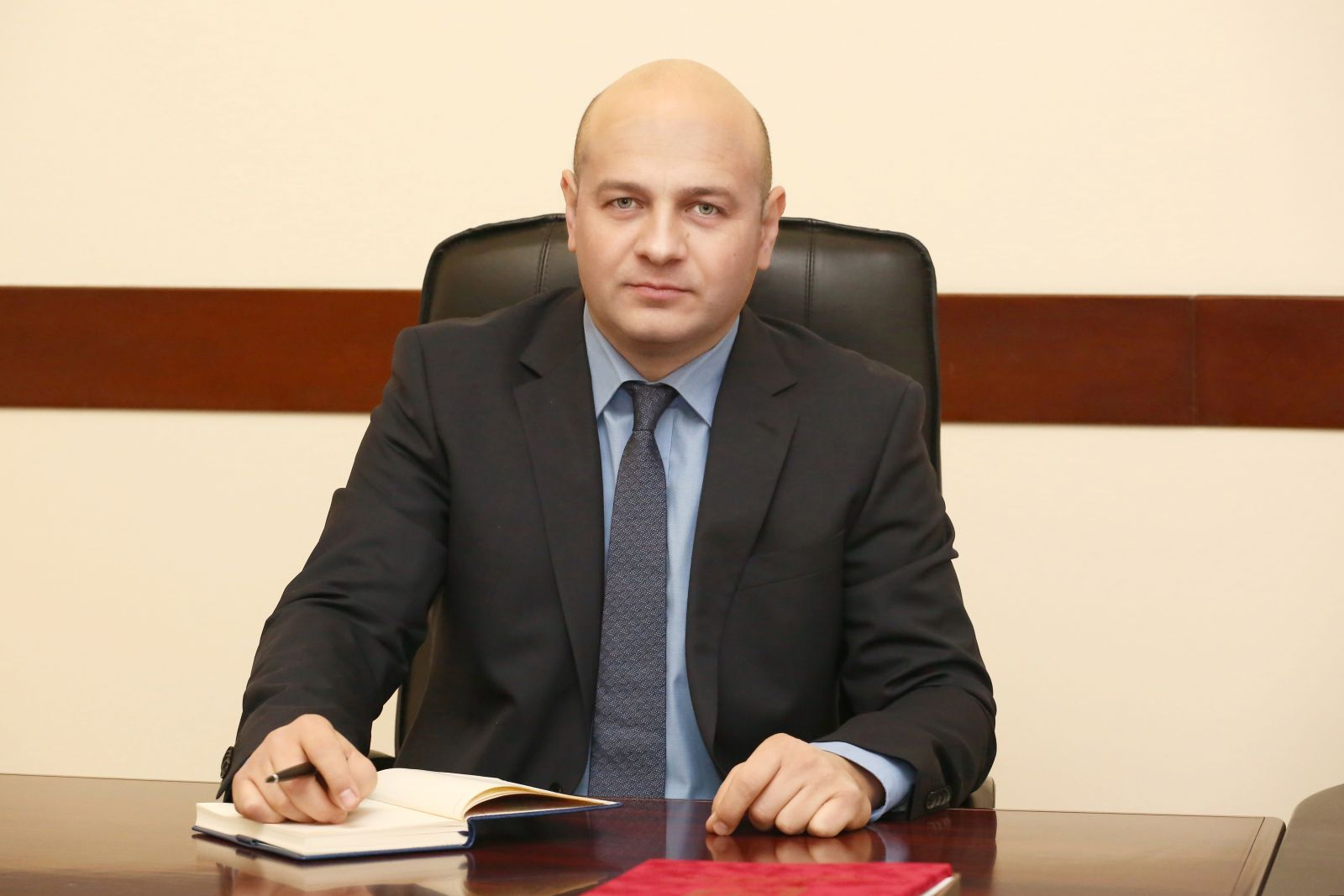

Governor of Kharkiv Oblast
- Acting
- In office 11 August 2021 – 24 December 2021
- Preceded by: Aina Tymchuk
- Succeeded by: Oleh Synyehubov

Deputy Governor of Kharkiv Oblast
- In office 11 January 2017 – 11 August 2021

Personal details
- Born: Oleksandr Yevhenovych Skakun; 21 August 1973 (age 53) Ukraine, Soviet Union

Oleksandr Yevhenovych Skakun (Ukrainian: Олександр Євгенович Скакун; born on 21 August 1973), is a Ukrainian government official, who was governor of Kharkiv Oblast from 11 August 2021 to 24 December 2021. He is a Candidate of Law awarded in 2012.

== Biography ==
Oleksandr Skakun was born on 21 August 1973. From December 1993 to June 1994, Skakun served in the Ukrainian Ground Forces.

From February 1995 to January 2017, Skakun served in the Security Service of Ukraine in Kharkiv.

Skakun graduated in 2000 from the Yaroslav Mudryi National Law University and in 2005 from the Kharkiv National Academy of Urban Economy. He is a Candidate of Law awarded in 2012.

On 11 January 2017 Skakun was appointed Deputy Governor of Kharkiv Oblast working under Governor Yuliya Svitlychna. When Svitlychna left this post in November 2019 Skakun continued his career in the Kharkiv Oblast State Administration. After Aina Tymchuk was dismissed as Kharkiv Governor, on 11 August 2021, Skakun was appointed as the acting Governor of Kharkiv Oblast.

On 24 December 2021 President Volodymyr Zelenskyy appointed Oleh Synyehubov as Governor of Kharkiv Oblast.

Political offices
Preceded by Aina Tymchuk	Governor of Kharkiv Oblast; 2021	Succeeded by Oleh Synyehubov
