= Vitaliy Voitsekhirskyi =

Ukrainian politician

- Віталій Войцехівський
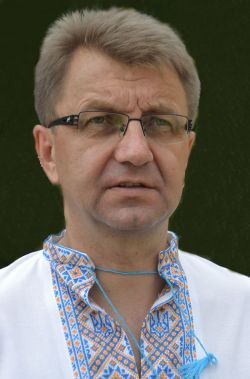

People's Deputy of Ukraine
- Incumbent
- Assumed office 16 November 2021
- Preceded by: Oleksandr Skichko
- Constituency: Cherkasy Oblast, No. 197

Personal details
- Born: 4 July 1967 (age 59) Bashtechky, Ukrainian SSR, Soviet Union
- Party: Servant of the People
- Other political affiliations: Independent; Petro Poroshenko Bloc
- Education: Kyiv National Economic University

Military service
- Allegiance: Soviet Union
- Years of service: 1986–1988

Vitaliy Oleksandrovych Voitsekhirskyi (Ukrainian: Віталій Олександрович Войцехівський; born 4 July 1967) is a Ukrainian politician currently serving as a People's Deputy of Ukraine representing Ukraine's 197th electoral district from Servant of the People since 2021. He previously served as mayor of Zolotonosha from 2010 to 2021.

== Early life and career ==
Vitaliy Oleksandrovych Voitsekhirskyi was born on 4 July 1967 in the village of Bashtechky, in Ukraine's eastern Kharkiv Oblast, then under the Soviet Union. He served in the Soviet Armed Forces from 1986 to 1988 before graduating from the Kyiv National Economic University in 1990 with a specialisation in accounting, control, and analysis of economic activity. The same year, he began working at KyivMetroBud.

In 1991, Voitsekhirskyi began working at Zlatohor distillery in Zolotonosha Raion, and steadily worked his way up from an accountant to the distillery's general director. In addition, he is also an amateur volleyball master, and, prior to his election, was a candidate for Master of Sports of Ukraine.

== Political career ==
In the 2010 Ukrainian local elections, Voitsekhirskyi was first elected to the office of mayor of the city of Zolotonosha, located in eastern Cherkasy Oblast. In this election, he was part of the Union, Chornobyl, Ukraine Social and Ecological Party. He was subsequently re-elected twice: the first time during the 2015 Ukrainian local elections as part of the Petro Poroshenko Bloc, and the second time in the 2020 Ukrainian local elections as part of Servant of the People. In his 2020 re-election, he received a clear majority, with 55.67% of voters supporting him.

Following the resignation of Oleksandr Skichko as a People's Deputy of Ukraine to become Governor of Cherkasy Oblast, Voitsekhirskyi was selected as the candidate of Servant of the People to fill his position as People's Deputy of Ukraine from Ukraine's 197th electoral district. At the time of the election, he was an independent. The election was crowded, including former People's Deputies Vladyslav Holub (independent, from the 197th district), Leonid Datsenko (also an independent from the 197th district), and Andriy Illienko (Svoboda, from the 215th district), as well as 21 other candidates. Voitsekhirskyi won out, winning with 46.95% of the vote. Holub was the next-closest candidate, bringing in 25.44% of the vote.

In the Verkhovna Rada (Ukraine's parliament), he joined the Servant of the People faction. He was additionally appointed to the Verkhovna Rada Committee on Organisation of State Power and Local-Self Government on 28 July 2022. In his position on the committee, he was criticised by anti-corruption non-governmental organisation Chesno for his 5 September 2022 vote in favour of a bill claimed by Chesno to curtail the powers of state anti-corruption authorities and reduce the number of people competing for leadership of the National Anti-Corruption Bureau.
