= Iryna Sysoyenko =

Ukrainian politician (born 1982)

Iryna Sysoienko
- Ірина Сисоєнко
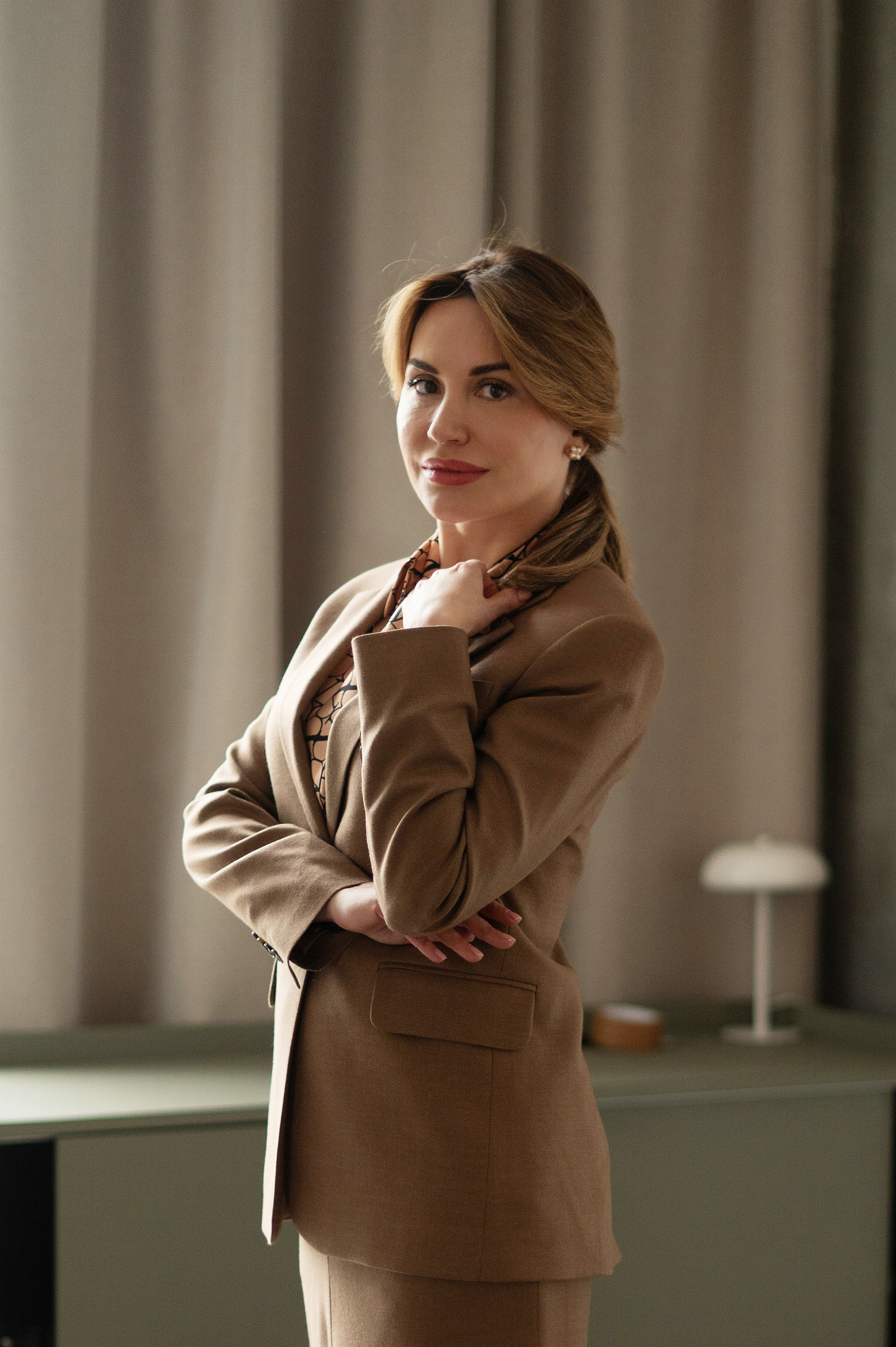
- Iryna Sysoienko in 2024

People's Deputy of Ukraine
- In office 27 November 2014 – 24 July 2019

Personal details
- Born: 3 June 1982 (age 44) Mykolaiv, Ukraine
- Party: Samopomich (Self Reliance)

Iryna Sysoyenko (Ukrainian: Ірина Володимирівна Сисоєнко; born March 6, 1982) is a Ukrainian politician and lawyer. She is a former National Deputy of the Verkhovna Rada (Parliament of Ukraine) representing the Samopomich (Self Reliance) party.

== Early life and education ==
Iryna Sysoienko was born on March 6, 1982, in Mykolaiv, Ukraine. She studied law at the International Solomon University, graduating in 2003. She continued her studies at the National Academy of Internal Affairs from 2003 to 2004, and at the Intellectual Property Institute from 2003 to 2005.

== Career ==
From 2005 to 2009, Sysoienko worked as a chief specialist in the judicial management department of the Ministry of Science and Education, where she was responsible for protecting intellectual property rights in Ukraine. In 2009, she became the General Director of the patent law agency Brand Group. From 2014 she has become co-founder and general director at the law firm Babych, Sysoienko and Partners.

In 2014, Sysoienko became a lecturer in Civil Law at Kyiv Law University of the Academy of Arts in Ukraine. She is the author of numerous articles and publications on copyright, intellectual property, unfair competition, protection of rights and medical law. She is co-founder and chairman of the Charity Fund for the Protection of Medical Workers' Rights. She is a member of the Advocate Association of Ukraine, the Ukrainian Bar Association.

In 2014, she was elected to the Verkhovna Rada.

Sysoienko again took part in the July 2019 Ukrainian parliamentary election, this time for the party Strength and Honor. In the election the party won 3.82%, lower than the 5% threshold to be allocated parliamentary seats.
