= Vecherniy Kharkov =

Newspaper in Kharkiv, Ukraine

- Owner(s): Region Media Group
- Founder(s): Kharkiv City Committee of the Communist Party of Ukraine
- Editor-in-chief: Olena Shevchuk
- Founded: 1969
- City: Kharkiv
- Website: https://vecherniy.kharkov.ua/

Vecherniy Kharkov (Russian: Вечерний Харьков, literally Evening Kharkiv) is a regional Ukrainian newspaper published in Russian. The editor-in-chief of Vecherniy Kharkov is Olena Shevchuk. The newspaper Vecherniy Kharkov is regional information printed edition for Kharkiv residents and provides information on the life of the region.

== History ==
The newspaper began publication on January 1, 1969, in Ukrainian as Vechirniy Kharkiv. It later switched to a bilingual format, with Ukrainian and Russian versions being published simultaneously. It is currently published in Russian three times a week and is available by subscription and at newsstands in the Kharkiv area. Furthermore, it also has an online version.

== Organization ==
Together with the football newspaper "GOL!" and TV channel R1 is part of the media group "Region", which is associated with Oleksandr Kahanovskyi, the son-in-law of killed Yevhen Kushnaryov.
