= Oleksiy Kucher =

Ukrainian politician

- Олексій Кучер
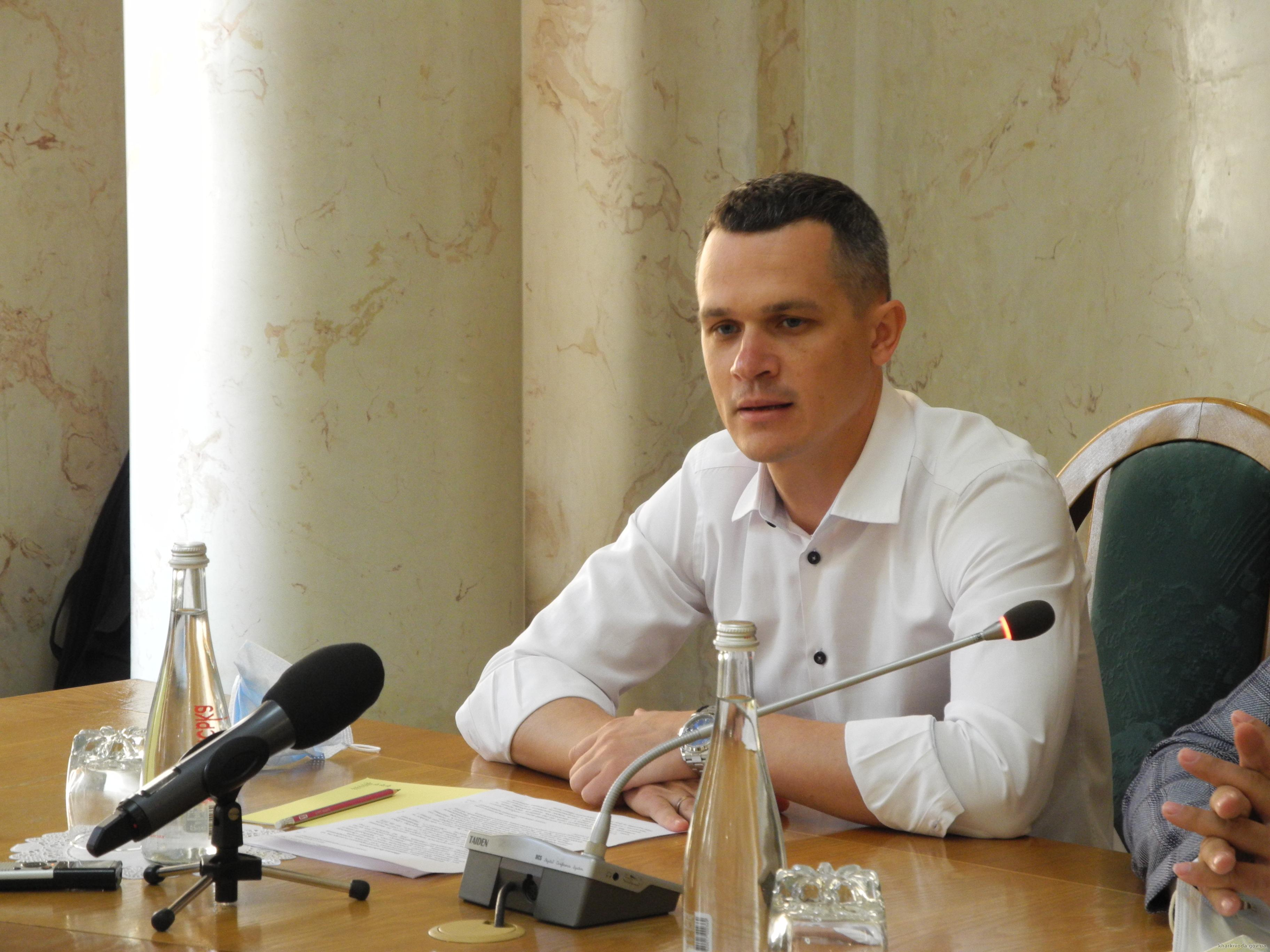
- Oleksiy Kucher

Governor of Kharkiv Oblast
- In office 5 November 2019 – 27 November 2020
- President: Volodymyr Zelenskyy
- Preceded by: Yuliya Svitlychna
- Succeeded by: Aina Tymchuk

People's Deputy of Ukraine
- In office 29 August 2019 – 3 December 2019
- Preceded by: Anatoliy Hirshfeld
- Succeeded by: Yuliya Svitlychna

Personal details
- Born: Oleksiy Volodymyrovych Kucher; 23 March 1985 (age 41) Novoraysk, Beryslav Raion, Kherson Oblast, Ukrainian SSR, Soviet Union
- Party: Servant of the People
- Education: H.S. Skovoroda Kharkiv National Pedagogical University; Yaroslav Mudryi National Law University
- Occupation: lawyer politician

Oleksiy Volodymyrovych Kucher (Ukrainian: Олексій Володимирович Кучер; born 23 March 1985) is a Ukrainian lawyer and politician. Kucher was Governor of Kharkiv Oblast from November 2019 until November 2020.

== Biography ==
Kucher studied at the H.S. Skovoroda Kharkiv National Pedagogical University.

He also graduated from the Yaroslav Mudryi National Law University.

He obtained his lawyer's license in 2011. Teacher at the High School of Advocacy.

Kucher was elected to the Verkhovna Rada in the 2019 Ukrainian parliamentary election. As a candidate of Servant of the People he won election district 179 (located in Kharkiv Oblast) with 50.62% of the votes; Serhii Chernov of Opposition Bloc placed second with 17.25% of the votes. In parliament he became member of the Verkhovna Rada Committee on Legal Policy.

On 11 November 2019 President Volodymyr Zelenskyy appointed Kucher Governor of Kharkiv Oblast.

In the October 2020 Kharkiv mayoral election Kucher was the mayoral candidate of Servant of the People. He finished third with 7.24%, losing to incumbent mayor Hennadiy Kernes.

President Zelenskyy dismissed Kucher, as Governor of Kharkiv Oblast, on 27 November 2020.

=== Head of the State Regulatory Service of Ukraine ===
On January 13, 2021, the Prime Minister of Ukraine Denys Shmyhal signed CMU Resolution No. 12-p on the appointment of O. Kucher as the Head of the State Regulatory Service of Ukraine effective January 14, 2021, by concluding a contract for civil service for the period of quarantine.

After being appointed as the Head of the SRS in January 2021, he resigned his powers as a deputy of the Kharkiv City Council ahead of schedule.

By the Order of the Cabinet of Ministers of Ukraine No. 1230-r dated October 11, 2021, he was appointed Head of the State Regulatory Service of Ukraine for a five-year term, following a competitive selection process, effective October 13, 2021.

== See also ==
- List of members of the parliament of Ukraine, 2019–24

Political offices
Preceded by Yuliya Svitlychna	Governor of Kharkiv Oblast; 2019-2020	Succeeded by Aina Tymchuk
