= Yuliya Svitlychna =

Ukrainian politician

- Юлія Світлична
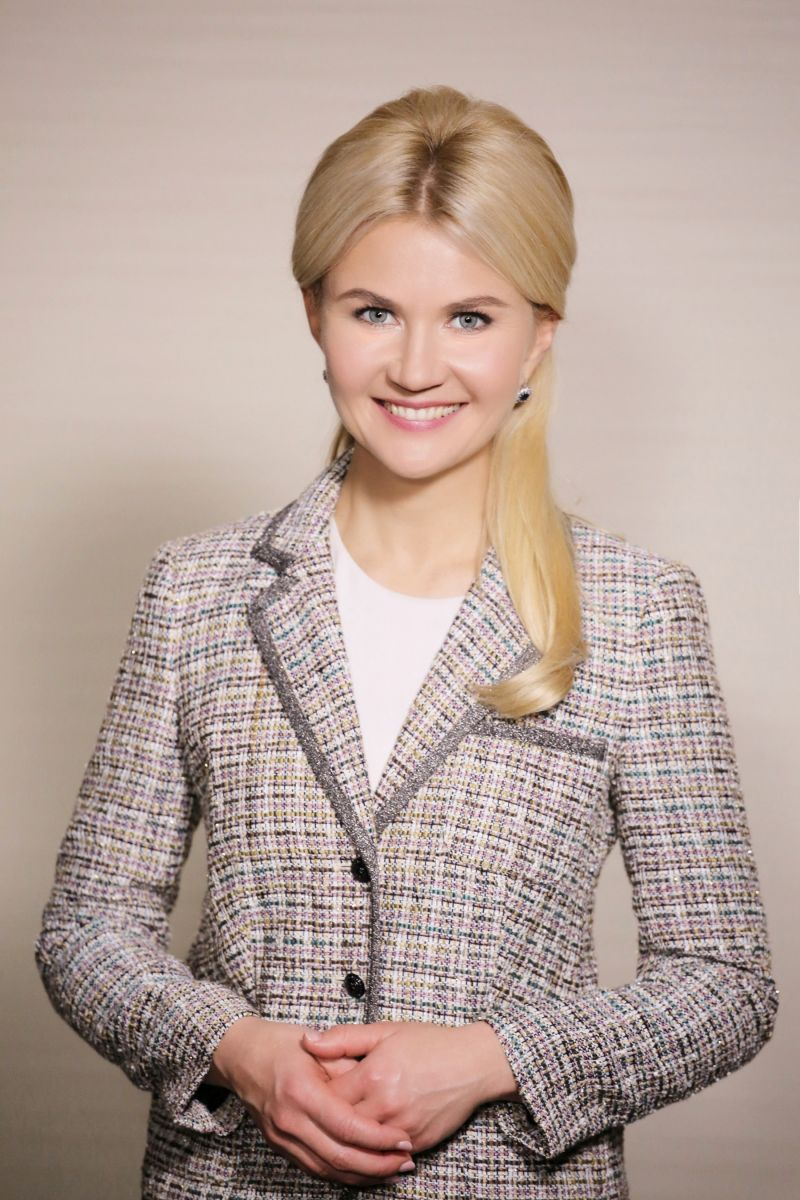
- Official portrait, 2017

Member of the Verkhovna Rada
- Incumbent
- Assumed office 13 April 2020

Governor of Kharkiv Oblast
- In office 15 October 2016 – 6 November 2019
- Preceded by: Ihor Rainin
- Succeeded by: Oleksiy Kucher

Governor of Kharkiv Oblast (acting)
- In office 29 August 2016 – 15 October 2016

Personal details
- Born: 6 June 1984 (age 42) Kharkiv, Ukrainian SSR, Soviet Union
- Party: Independent
- Other political affiliations: Petro Poroshenko Bloc (2015–2019)

Yuliya Svitlychna (Ukrainian: Юлія Олександрівна Світлична, romanized: Yuliia Oleksandrivna Svitlychna, born 6 June 1984, Kharkiv) is a Ukrainian politician. In a 2019 Ukrainian parliamentary election by-election on 15 March 2020 Svitlychna was elected to Ukraine's parliament. From 15 October 2016 until 6 November 2019 she was the Governor of Kharkiv Oblast. Before this she was a Deputy of the Kharkiv Oblast Council of 7th convocation, vice president of the Chamber of Regions in the Congress of Local and Regional Authorities of the Council of Europe. Svitlychna has a PhD in state administration and was during her reign the youngest regional governor in Ukraine.

== Early life and education ==
Yuliya Svitlychna was born on 6 June, 1984 in Kharkiv. She graduated from State University of Food Technology and Trade with a degree in international economics.

In 2012, Svitlychna graduated with honors from Kharkiv Regional Institute of Public Administration of the National Academy of Public Administration in relation to the Office of the President of Ukraine. There, she studied state administration, and finished post-graduate studies on mechanisms of state administration.

== Career ==
Following her graduation from State University of Food Technology and Trade, Svitlychna began her career as a civil servant at the Head Office of Economics, Kharkiv Oblast State Administration (RSA).

By 2014, Svitlychna returned to civil service as Head of the Department of Competitive Improvement of the Region at Kharkiv RSA. At this time, she also served as Deputy Head of Kharkiv RSA, First Deputy Head, Acting Head. During her years as Deputy Head, Svitlychna oversaw international relations, namely increasing the region's fame and attracting investment.

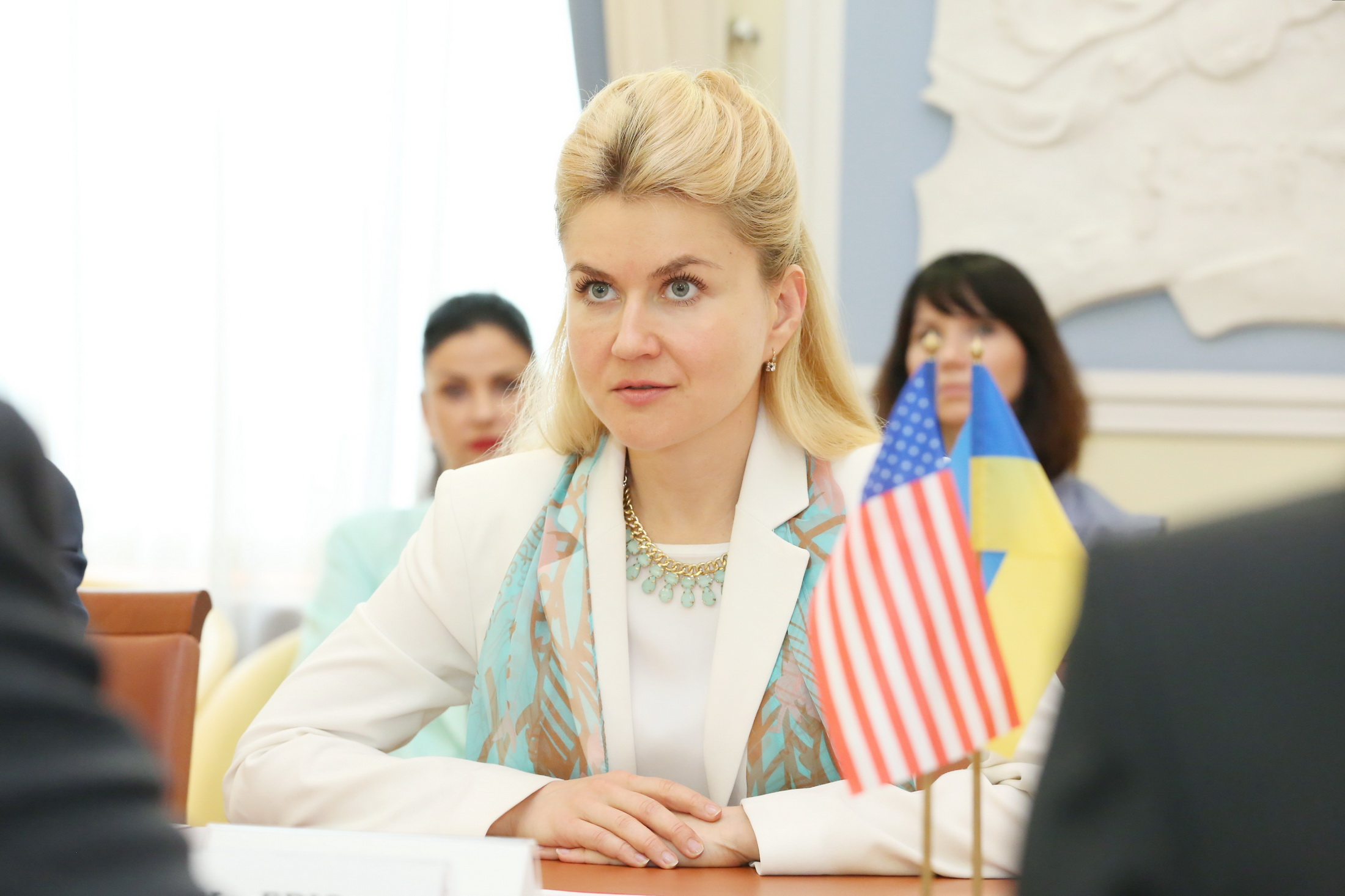
Svitlychna meeting with US delegation in July 2016

In the 2015 Ukrainian local elections she was elected Deputy of Kharkiv Oblast Council for Petro Poroshenko Bloc. As Deputy, she is a member of Ukrainian delegation to the Congress of Local and Regional Authorities of the Council of Europe for 2016–2020. At the 31st session of the Congress Svitlychna was elected vice president of the Chamber of Regions, and is also a member of the Congress Bureau responsible for coordinating the work of chambers and committees as well as organizing sessions. On 30 August 2016 Svitlychna became acting Governor of Kharkiv Oblast after her predecessor Ihor Rainin on 29 Aug 2016 had been promoted to head the Presidential Administration of Ukraine. On 15 October 2016 she was officially appointed Governor of Kharkiv by President Petro Poroshenko.

On 6 November 2019 President Volodymyr Zelenskyy replaced Svitlychna and appointed Oleksiy Kucher Governor of Kharkiv Oblast.

In a 2019 Ukrainian parliamentary election by-election on 15 March 2020 Svitlychna won (as an independent candidate) the parliamentary seat that was vacated by Kucher. She won this electoral district 179 located in Kharkiv Oblast with 77.54% or 30.194 votes (voter turnout was 27.47%, Kucher had been elected with a 51.01% voter turnout). (Early in the campaign) Kucher's party Servant of the People had withdrawn its candidate in support of Svitlychna.

In the October 2020 Kharkiv local election a new local party backed by Svitlychna, Bloc Svitlychna — Together! participated. It won 17 seats in the Kharkiv Oblast Council. and 6 deputies in the Kharkiv City Council.

== See also ==
- Denys Skoryi

Political offices
Preceded by Ihor Rainin	Governor of Kharkiv Oblast; 2016-2019	Succeeded by Oleksiy Kucher
