= Governor of Kharkiv Oblast =

Chief executive of Kharkiv Oblast, Ukraine

- Seal of Kharkiv Oblast

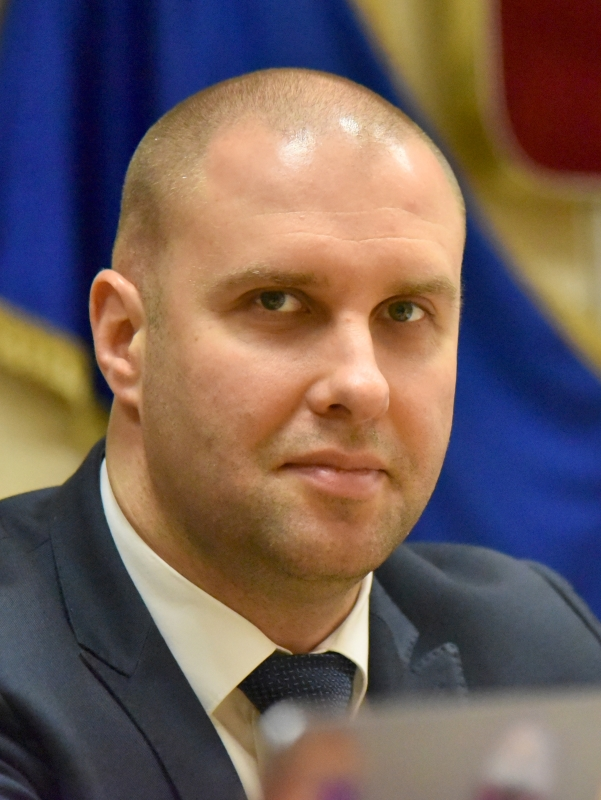
- Incumbent; Oleh Syniehubov since 24 December 2021
- Residence: Kharkiv
- Term length: Four years
- Inaugural holder: Vasyl Kuzmenko; 1932
- Formation: 1932 as Chairman of Executive Committee of Kharkiv Oblast
- Website: Government of Kharkiv Oblast

The governor of Kharkiv Oblast (Ukrainian: Голова Харківської обласної державної адміністрації) is the head of the executive branch for the Kharkiv Oblast.

The office of governor is an appointed position, with officeholders being appointed by the president of Ukraine, on recommendation from the Prime Minister of Ukraine, to serve a four-year term. On 24 December 2021 Oleh Syniehubov was appointed governor of Kharkiv Oblast.

The official residence for the governor is located in Kharkiv.

== Governors ==
=== Chairman of Executive Committee of Kharkiv Oblast ===
- Vasyl Kuzmenko (1932–1933)
- Illya Shelekhes (1933–1934)
- Ivan Fedyayev (1934–1935)
- Grygoriy Pryadchenko (1935–1937)
- ? (1937–1938)
- Grygoriy Butenko (1938–1940)
- Petro Svynarenko (1940–1942)
- Nazi German occupation (1941–1943)
- Fyodor Artem (1942–1943?) (acting)
- Dmytro Zhila (1943) (acting)
- Ivan Voloshyn (1943–1954)
- Dmytro Pisnyachevsky (1954–1963) (Note: For Agriculture January 1963 – December 1964)
- Kostyantyn Trusov (1963–1964) (Note: For Industry)
- Dmytro Pisnyachevsky (1964–1968)
- Andriy Bezditko (1968–1983)
- Oleksandr Maselsky (1983–1992)

=== Representative of the President ===
- Oleksandr Maselsky (1992–1994)

=== Chairman of the Executive Committee ===
- Oleksandr Maselsky (1994–1995)

=== Heads of the Administration ===
- Oleksandr Maselsky (1995–1996)
- Oleh Dyomin (1996–2000) (Note: Acting to August 8, 1996)
- Yevhen Kushnaryov (2000–2004)
- Stepan Maselsky (2004–2005)
- Arsen Avakov (2005–2010)
- Volodymyr Babayev (2010) (acting)
- Mykhailo Dobkin (2010–2014)
- Ihor Baluta (2014–2015)
- Ihor Raynin (2015–2016)
- Yuliya Svitlychna (15 October 2016 – 6 November 2019) (Note: Acting Governor from 30 August 2016 until 15 October 2016.)
- Oleksiy Kucher (6 November 2019 – 27 November 2020)
- Aina Tymchuk (27 November 2020 – 11 August 2021)
- Oleksandr Skakun (11 August 2021 – 24 December 2021, acting)
- Oleh Syniehubov (24 December 2021 – incumbent)

== Sources ==
- World Statesmen.org
