= Korolchuk =

Korolchuk (Ukrainian: Корольчук) is a Ukrainian patronymic surname derived from the nickname Korol, "king".

- Andrey Korolchuk (born 1961), Soviet and Russian painter, graphic artist, book artist, teacher
- Bohdan Korolchuk (born 1992), Ukrainian politician and former police officer
