= Vitaliy Dyakivnych =

Ukrainian politician

Vitaliy Diakivnych
- Віталій Дяківнич
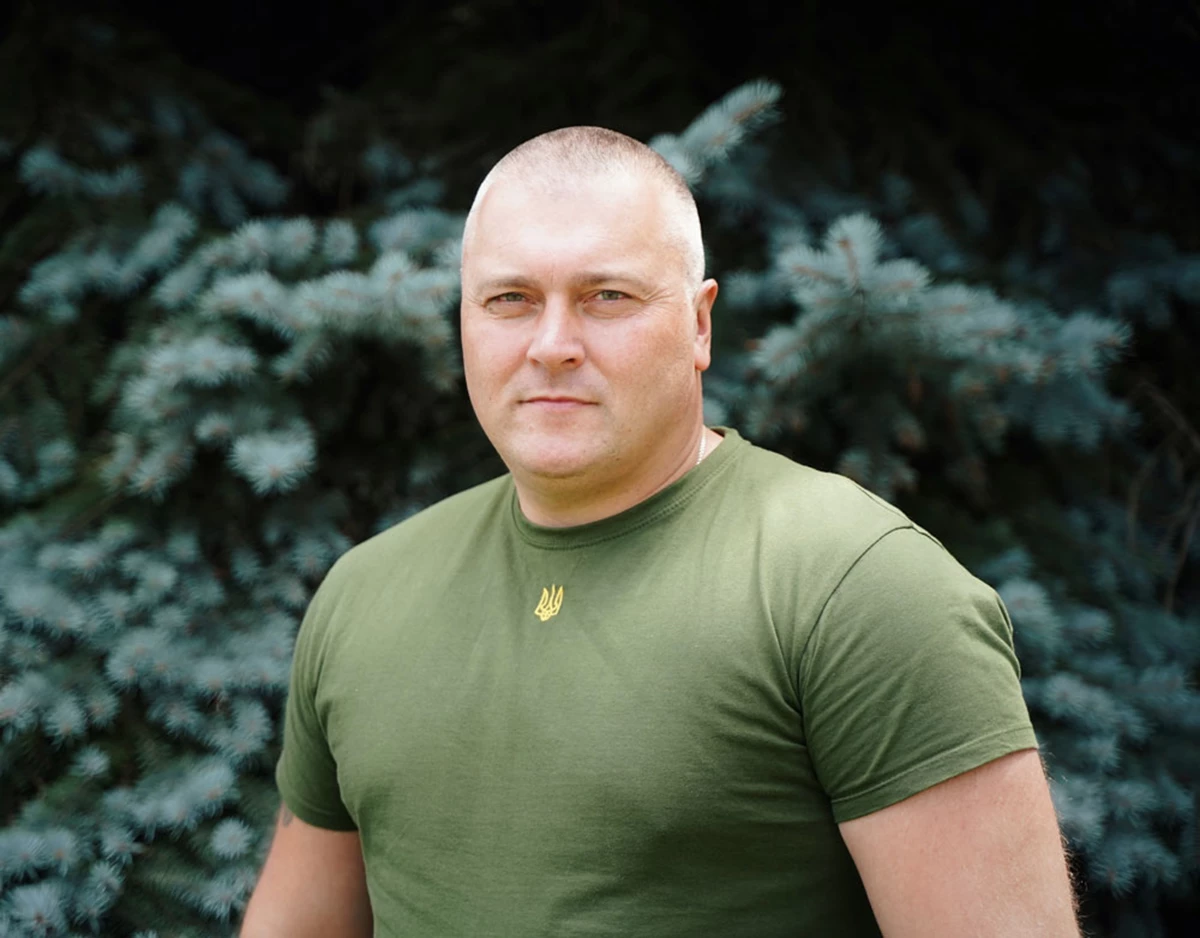
- Dyakivnych in 2026

Governor of Poltava Oblast
- Incumbent
- Assumed office 8 January 2026
- President: Volodymyr Zelenskyy
- Preceded by: Volodymyr Kohut; Oleksii Shpak (acting)

Personal details
- Born: 14 July 1979 (age 47) Dykanka, Poltava Oblast, Ukrainian SSR, Soviet Union
- Education: Poltava V.G. Korolenko National Pedagogical University
- Occupation: Politician

Vitaliy Anatoliyovych Dyakivnych (Ukrainian: Віталій Анатолійович Дяківнич; born 14 July 1979) is a Ukrainian politician who serves as the Governor of Poltava Oblast since 8 January 2026.

== Early life and education ==
Dyakivnych was born on 14 July 1979, in Dykanka, Dykanka Raion, Poltava Oblast.

In 2001, he became the alumnus of the Poltava V.G. Korolenko National Pedagogical University, becoming a history and basic economics teacher.

In 2020, he finished his studies at the Kharkiv Regional Institute of Public Administration NAPU under the president of Ukraine, receiving a master's degree in public administration.

== Career ==
On 1 January 2023, Dyakivnych was appointed as the head of the Myrhorod Raion Military Administration, after being the first deputy head from June 2021.

At some point, he was a member of the Dykanka Village Council of the 8th convocation.

On 8 January 2026, Dyakivnych became the Governor of Poltava Oblast on the decree of President Zelenskyy. He thus replaced Volodymyr Kohut in leading the Poltava Oblast Military Administration.

== Awards and honors ==
Dykaivnych's awards and honors include:

- Medal "For the Defence of Ukraine" (2022)
- Commemorative breastplate of the Commander of the Air Force of Ukraine "For assistance to the Air Forces of the Armed Forces of Ukraine" (2024)
