= Oleh Pruhlo =

Governor of Poltava Oblast

- Олег Пругло
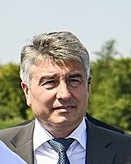

Governor of Poltava Oblast (acting)
- In office 14 June 2019 – 11 November 2019
- Preceded by: Roman Tovsty (acting)
- Succeeded by: Oleh Synyehubov

Governor of Poltava Oblast (acting)
- In office 18 November 2014 – 26 December 2014
- Preceded by: Viktor Buhaichuk
- Succeeded by: Valeriy Holovko

Personal details
- Born: Oleh Yevhenovych Pruhlo; 15 April 1964 (age 60); Donetsk, Soviet Union
- Political party: Batkivshchyna

Oleh Yevhenovych Pruhlo (Ukrainian: Олег Євгенович Пругло; born on 15 April 1964), is a Ukrainian politician who had been the acting Governor of Poltava Oblast in 2014, and again in 2019.

He had been the first Deputy, and Deputy Head of the Poltava Regional State Administration. He is a member of the Batkivshchyna party.

== Biography ==
Oleh Pruhlo was born in Donetsk on 15 April 1964.

From August 1981 to July 1985, he was a cadet of the Donetsk Higher Military-Political School of Engineering Troops and Communications Troops. He was an officer with higher military and political education, teacher of history and social sciences.

Between July 1985 and January 1999, Pruhlo served in the Soviet Army and then the Armed Forces of Ukraine. In May 1986, as a Soviet army officer, he took part in the liquidation of the Chernobyl accident.

Since 1991 he has been elected a member of the Oktyabrskaya district council in Poltava six times.

Between January 1999 and September 2001, he was retiring from the Armed Forces.

In 2000, he graduated from the Poltava Cooperative Institute with a degree in economics and finance.

From September 2001 to 2006, he was the deputy chairman of the Oktyabrsky District Council of Poltava. He was promoted as a chairman from 2006 to 2010. He was demoted back to deputy chairman from 2010 to September 2011.

From September 2011 to May 2014, he had retired from the Armed Forces.

From May 2014 to April 2015, he was the 1st Deputy Head of the Poltava Regional State Administration.

On 18 November 2014, Pruhlo was the acting Governor of Poltava Oblast. He held that position until 26 December, as he was officially replaced by Valery Holovko as the governor.

Since April 2015, he had been the Deputy Head of the Poltava Regional State Administration.

On 14 June 2019, Pruhlo became the acting Governor of Poltava Oblast again. On 11 November he was officially replaced by Oleh Synyehubov.

== Family ==
He is married, and has a son.
