= Dmytro Lunin =

Ukrainian businessman and statesman

- Дмитро Лунін

Governor of Poltava Oblast (acting)
- In office 24 December 2021 – 10 October 2023
- Preceded by: Oleh Synyehubov
- Succeeded by: Filip Pronin

First Deputy Chairman of the Poltava Regional State Administration
- In office December 2019 – 24 December 2021

Personal details
- Born: Dmytro Serhiyovych Lunin; 31 March 1980 (age 46) Kharkov, Ukrainian SSR, Soviet Union (now Kharkiv, Kharkiv Oblast, Ukraine)
- Children: 2 sons

Dmytro Serhiyovych Lunin (Ukrainian: Дмитро Сергійович Лунін; born on 31 March 1980), is a Ukrainian businessman and statesman, who served as the acting governor of Poltava Oblast 24 December 2021 to 10 October 2023.

He is a doctor of law.

== Biography ==
Dmytro Lunin was born on 31 March 1980 in Kharkiv.

He graduated from Kharkiv school No. 119.

In 2001, he graduated from the National Technical University "Kharkiv Polytechnic Institute" (specialty "Economics and Entrepreneurship") and received a bachelor's degree.

In 2003, he graduated from the National Technical University "Kharkiv Polytechnic Institute" (specialty "Economic Cybernetics, engineer-manager").

From November 2003 to February 2005, he was the Head of the Sales Department, Troyanda-Kharkiv LLC, in Kharkiv.

From March 2005 to May 2009, he was the director of the Commercial Department of LLC TV "Khladoprom", Kharkiv.

From 2006 to 2013, he studied at The Open University, MBA.

From May 2009 to July 2015, he was the director of Hladik Trade LLC, Kharkov.

From August 2015 to March 2017, he was the director of the Commercial Department of Ice Retail LLC, in Zaporizhzhia.

From 2016 to 2017, he studied at the Kyiv-Mohyla Business School, studying finance and marketing.

Between March 2017 and November 2019, Lunin became an entrepreneur in Kharkiv.

From November 2018 to November 2019, he was a founder, and a commercial director of 4E Consulting LLC, in Kharkiv.

From December 2019 to 24 December 2021, Lunin was the First Deputy Chairman of the Poltava Regional State Administration, while residing in Poltava.

In 2021, he graduated from the Educational and Scientific Institute "Institute of Public Administration" KhNU named after V.N. Karazin, with a specialty of "Public administration".

On 24 December 2021, Lunin became the acting Governor of Poltava Oblast. On 10 October 2023 he was relieved of this post.

== Family ==
Lunin's father, Serhiy, was part of the Department of Agriculture, and a Master of Public Administration. His mother, Larysa, is a honored teacher of Ukraine.

He raises two sons.

== Sports ==
He is a candidate for Master of Sports in boxing, basketball, swimming. He was a winner of all-Ukrainian competitions.
