= Volodymyr Kohut =

Ukrainian politician

- Володимир Когут

Governor of Poltava Oblast (acting)
- In office February 2025 – 8 January 2026
- Preceded by: Bohdan Korolchuk

Personal details
- Born: Volodymyr Mykolayovych Kohut; 27 February 1985 (age 41) Pryslip, Ukrainian SSR, Soviet Union

Volodymy Mykolayovych Kohut (Ukrainian: Володимир Миколайович Когут; born on 27 February 1985) is a Ukrainian politician who is currently the acting Governor of Poltava Oblast since February 2025.

He has been the deputy head of the Poltava Oblast State Administration.

== Biography ==
Volodymyr Kohut was born on 27 February 1985.

Between February 2002 and February 2007 he served in the tax police in the positions of command staff. In 2006, he graduated from the National University of the State Tax Service of Ukraine in the specialty "Law enforcement", obtaining a lawyer qualification. The same year, he received a bachelor's degree at the National Academy of the State Tax Service of Ukraine.

From February 2007 to November 2016 he worked as a manager of the projects and a master of CJSC "Ruuckki Ukraine".

From December 2016 to May 2018, he was an analyst of the department of analysis of clients of management of financial monitoring at PJSC "Alfa-Bank".

In June 2018, he began work at the National Agency of Ukraine for the detection, search and management of assets obtained from corruption and other crimes (ARMA), where by September 2023 he worked as the chief specialist Information and analytical support for the detection and search of assets.

From October to December 2023, he was an advisor to the Governor of Poltava Oblast Filip Pronin.

In December 2023, Kohut was the Deputy Head of the Poltava Regional State Administration for Digital Development, Digital Transformations and Digitalization (CDTO).

In January 2025, he became the acting Governor of Poltava Oblast.

He speaks Ukrainian and English.

== Family ==
He is married to his wife, Lesya Kohut, the couple raises two daughters: Veronika and Anastasiya.
