= Valeriy Holovko =

Ukrainian politician (born 1965)

- Валерій Головко
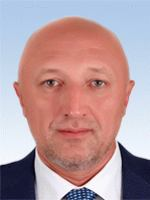

10th Governor of Poltava Oblast
- In office 16 December 2014 – 11 June 2019
- Preceded by: Oleh Pruhlo (acting)
- Succeeded by: Roman Tovsty (acting)

Member of Parliament of the Verkhovna Rada
- In office 12 December 2012 – 27 November 2014

Personal details
- Born: Valeriy Anatoliyovych Holovko; 14 December 1965 (age 60) Leninsky, Kazakhstan, Soviet Union
- Party: Independent
- Other political affiliations: Batkivshchyna

Valeriy Anatoliyovych Holovko (Ukrainian: Валерій Анатолійович Головко; born 14 December 1965), is a Kazakh-born Ukrainian politician who had served as the 10th Governor of Poltava Oblast from 2014 to 2019.

He had also served as a member of parliament from 2012 to 2014.

== Biography ==
Valeriy Holovko was born on 14 December 1965.

In 1989, he graduated from Poltava Cooperative Institute with a degree in economics. He continued his education at the Ukrainian Institute of Market Relations and Entrepreneurship as a manager of foreign economic activity and at the Kharkiv Regional Institute of Public Administration of the National Academy of Public Administration under the President of Ukraine, obtaining a master's degree in public administration.

He has a PhD in economics.

He started working in 1989 as a senior engineer in the Trade Department of the Poltava City Executive Committee.

From 1991 to 1992, he was the deputy director of the Poltava Legend Society.

From 1992 to 2002 he was the manager of the Ukrainian-German Joint Venture Polimpex.

Between 2002 and 2012 he was the director of PJSC "Central Department Store".

In 2010, Holovko joined the Front for Change party and remained there until 2012. In 2012, together with other members (in order to consolidate opposition forces), he suspended his membership in the party in order to run in the parliamentary elections on the Batkivshchyna list as an independent.

He was elected a deputy of the Poltava Oblast Council of the fifth (Our Ukraine faction) and sixth convocation (Front for Change faction). He worked as a member of the Standing Committee on Budget, Entrepreneurship and Property Management.

In the 2012 Ukrainian parliamentary elections, he was elected a member of parliament, the People's Deputy of the Verkhovna Rada (the Ukrainian national parliament) on the list of the All-Ukrainian Union Batkivshchyna party, No. 56 on the electoral list. He worked as the Chairman of the Subcommittee on Ensuring the Activities of the Verkhovna Rada of Ukraine and People's Deputies of Ukraine of the Committee on the Rules of Procedure, Deputy Ethics and Ensuring the Activities of the Verkhovna Rada.

On 26 December 2014, Ukrainian President Petro Poroshenko appointed Holovko as the 10th Governor of Poltava Oblast by Decree No. 965/2014.

On 12 March 2019, President Poroshenko initiated the dismissal of Holovko from the post of the Governor due to suspicions of involvement in many corruption schemes, which probably led to significant losses to the State Budget of Ukraine.

The National Anti-Corruption Bureau has opened a series of criminal proceedings on suspicion of committing particularly serious crimes by Holovko, his first deputy, and his other associates.

On 15 March, Holovko was dismissed as governor, and replaced by Roman Tovsty.

== Family ==
He is married to Svitlana, and has sons Volodymyr and Oleksandr.
