= Roman Tovstyi =

Governor of Poltava Oblast

- Роман Товстий

Governor of Poltava Oblast (acting)
- In office 15 March 2019 – 11 June 2019
- Preceded by: Valeriy Holovko
- Succeeded by: Oleh Pruhlo (acting)

Personal details
- Born: Roman Ivanovych Tovstyi; 18 June 1979 (age 45); Reshetylivka, Ukraine, Soviet Union
- Political party: Independent

Roman Ivanovych Tovstyi (Ukrainian: Роман Іванович Товстий; born on 18 June 1979), is Ukrainian politician who had served as the acting Governor of Poltava Oblast 15 March to 11 June 2019.

== Biography ==
Roman Tovstyi was born on 18 June 1979 in Reshetylivka, Poltava Oblast.

From July to August 1996, he was a handyman of the collective agricultural enterprise named after Gorky, Reshetylivka village, Poltava Oblast.

From September 1996 to June 1997, he was a student of Reshetyliv Vocational School 52 of Poltava region.

From September 1997 to June 2002 he was a student of Poltava State Pedagogical University named after VG Korolenko. In 2002, he graduated from Poltava National Pedagogical University named after Volodymyr Korolenko with a degree in pedagogy and methods of secondary education, history, geography, teacher of history and geography, organizer of local lore and tourism.

From June 2002 to April 2014 he was a private entrepreneur in Poltava.

From July 2011 to April 2014 he worked as a procurement manager for Kernel-Trade Limited Liability Company in Poltava.

Tovstyi was a candidate for People's Deputies from the UDAR party in the 2012 elections.

He was a member of the Poltava Oblast Council of the VII convocation.

Since April 2014, he was a Deputy Head of the Poltava Regional State Administration.

In 2017 he graduated from the National Academy of Public Administration under the President of Ukraine with a master's degree in social development management.

On 15 March 2019, Tovstyi was appointed the acting Governor of Poltava Oblast by President Petro Poroshenko. He was replaced by Oleh Pruhlo on 14 June.
