= Governor of Poltava Oblast =

Chief executive of Poltava Oblast, Ukraine

Head of military administration of Poltava Oblast
- Seal of Poltava Oblast

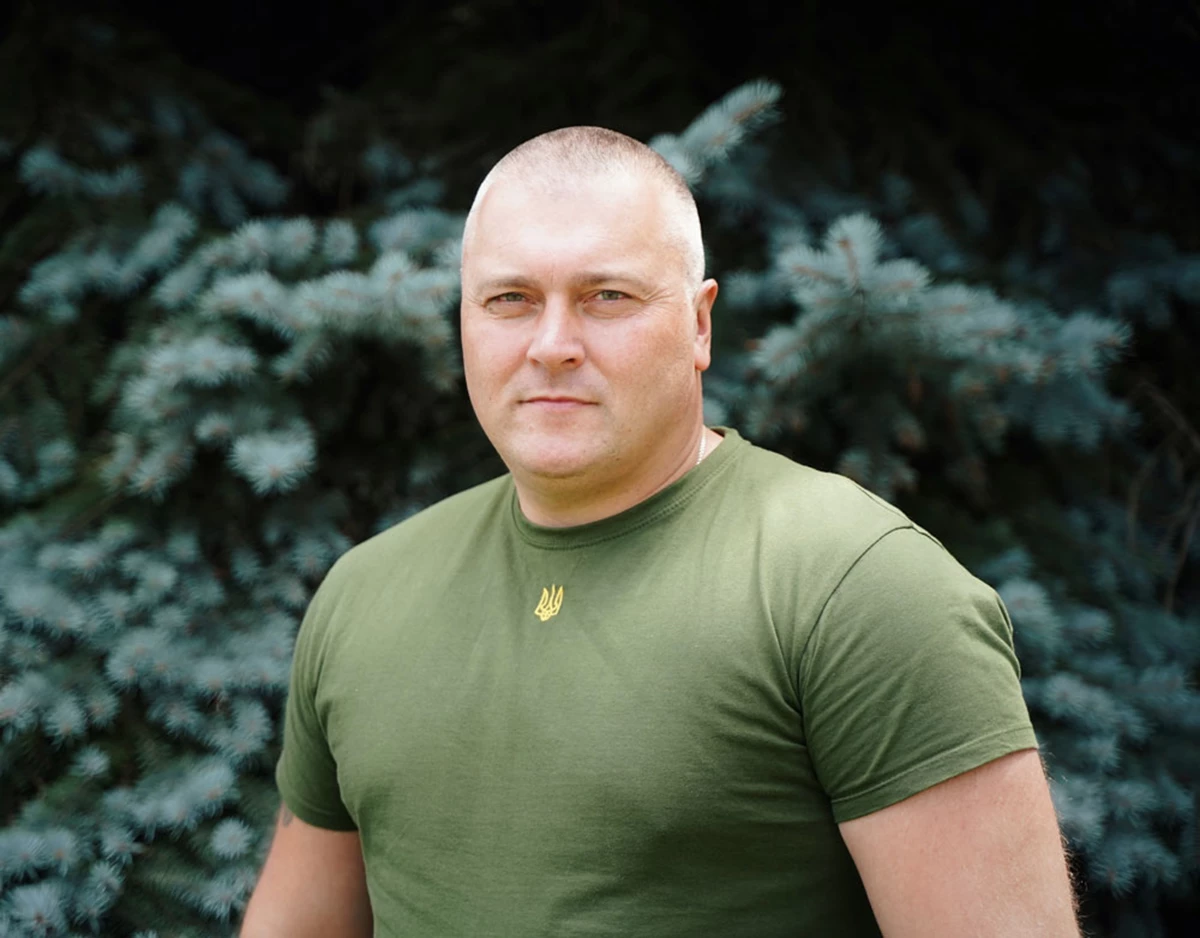
- Incumbent; Vitaliy Dyakivnych since 8 January 2026
- Residence: Poltava
- Term length: Four years
- Inaugural holder: Mykola Zaludyak; 1992–1994
- Formation: 1992 as Presidential representative
- Website: Government of Poltava Oblast

The governor of Poltava Oblast is the head of executive branch for the Poltava Oblast.

The office of governor is an appointed position, with officeholders being appointed by the president of Ukraine, on recommendation from the prime minister of Ukraine, to serve four-year term.

The official residence for the governor is located in Poltava.

== Governors ==
- Mykola Zaludyak (1992–1994, as the Presidential representative)
- Mykola Zaludyak (1995–1998, as the Governor)
- Oleksandr Kolesnikov (1998–1999)
- Anatoliy Kukoba (1999–2000)
- Yevhen Tomin (2000–2003)
- Oleksandr Udovichenko (2003–2005)
- Stepan Bulba (2005–2006)
- Viktor Inozemtsev (2006, acting)
- Valeriy Asadchev (2006–2010)
- Oleksandr Udovichenko (2010–2014)
- Viktor Buhaichuk (2014)
- Oleh Pruhlo (2014, acting)
- Valeriy Holovko (2014–2019)
- Roman Tovstyi (2019, acting)
- Oleh Pruhlo (2019, acting)
- Oleh Synyehubov (2019–2021)
- Dmytro Lunin (2021–2023, acting)
- Filip Pronin (2023–2024)
- Bohdan Korolchuk (2024–2025, acting)
- Volodymyr Kohut (2025-2026, acting)
- Oleksii Shpak (2026, acting)
- Vitaliy Dyakivnych (2026-present)

== Sources ==
- World Statesmen.org
