= Filip Pronin =

Ukrainian politician (born 1982)

- Філіп Пронін
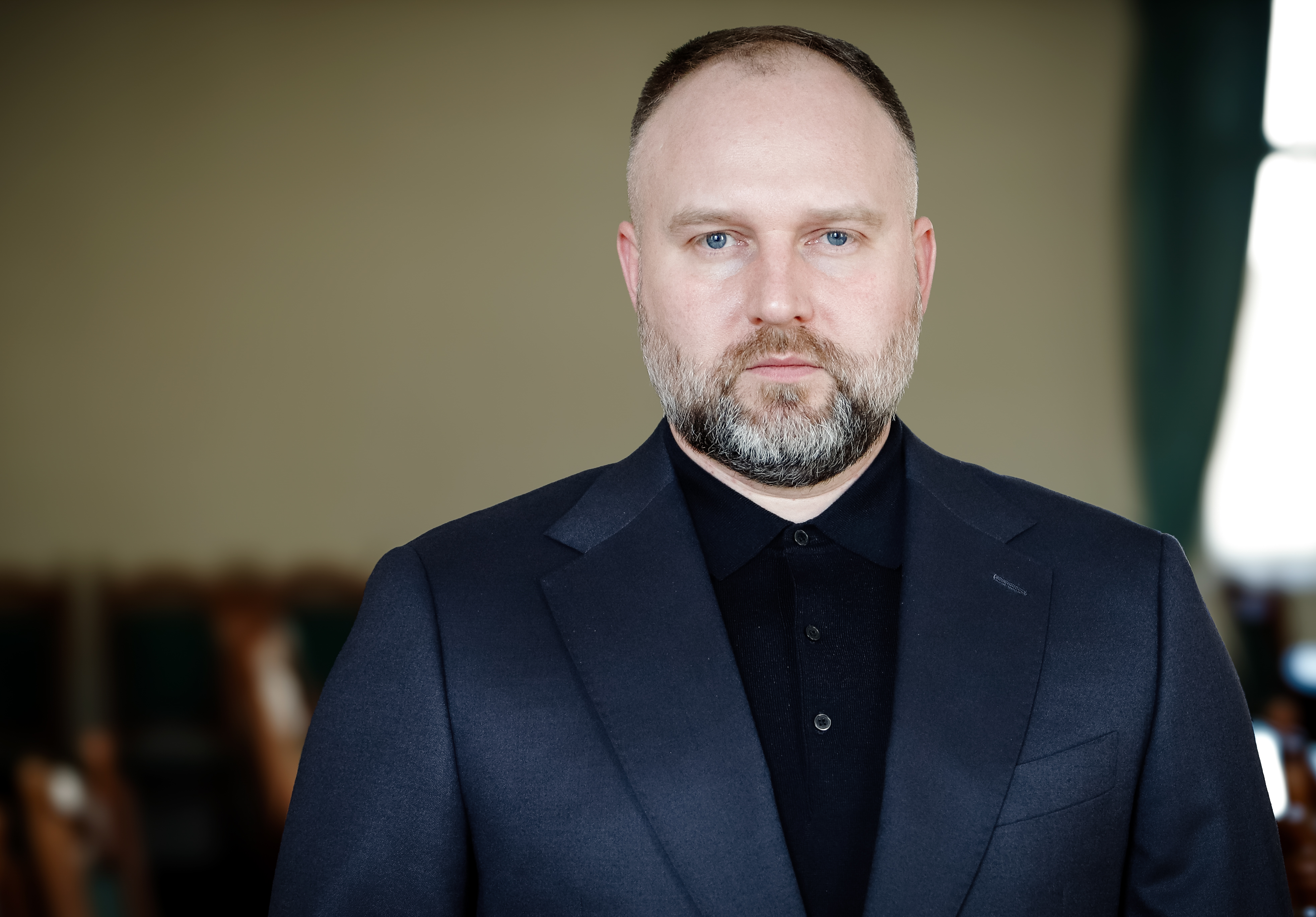

Head of the State Financial Monitoring Service of Ukraine
- Incumbent
- Assumed office 31 December 2024
- Preceded by: Ihor Cherkasky

Governor of Poltava Oblast
- In office 10 October 2023 – 30 December 2024
- Preceded by: Dmytro Lunin (acting)
- Succeeded by: Bohdan Korolchuk (acting)

Personal details
- Born: Filip Yevhenovych Pronin; 29 September 1982 (age 43) Kiev, Ukrainian SSR, Soviet Union (Now Kyiv, Ukraine)

Filip Yevhenovych Pronin (Ukrainian: Філіп Євгенович Пронін; born 29 September 1982), is a Ukrainian politician who was the governor of Poltava Oblast from 10 October 2023 to 30 December 2024.

== Biography ==
Filip Pronin was born in Kyiv on 29 September 1982. From 2003 to 2004, he worked as a financier of Ozdobbud LLC. In 2005, he graduated from the Kyiv National Economic University, majoring in international economics, with a master's degree in international economics. From 2005 to 2008, he worked as a chief specialist of the Department of Analytical Work at the State Financial Monitoring Committee of Ukraine. He specialized in financial investigations related to the activities of banking institutions, state monopolies, and illegal VAT refunds.

From 2008 to 2010, Pronin worked in the Ukrainian office of the KPMG. He was responsible for the creation and development of a group of independent financial investigations. The unit's activities were focused on corporate intelligence, financial investigations and anti–money laundering. From 2010 to 2017, he worked in the State Financial Monitoring Service of Ukraine as the deputy director of the financial investigations department — the head of the risk analysis and typology research department. In 2017, he headed the Department of Asset Discovery and Search of the National Agency of Ukraine for the Identification, Search and Management of Assets Obtained from Corruption and Other Crimes.

In 2018, Pronin graduated from the Private Higher Educational Institution Financial and Legal College, majoring in law, with a bachelor's degree. From January 2020 to October 2023, he was the deputy head of the National Agency of Ukraine for detection, search and management of assets obtained from corruption and other crimes.

Pronin is an accredited Moneyval (Council of Europe) expert on assessment of national anti–money laundering systems, and a government expert of Ukraine on implementation of the United Nations Convention Against Corruption. He is a representative of Ukraine in international platforms for asset detection and tracing: CARIN, Interpol, StAR and the joint project of the European Commission and Europol "Platform of EU Asset Recovery Offices". He represented Ukraine in the Minsk negotiations regarding the Russian Federation's violation of the International Convention on Combating the Financing of Terrorism. He was included in the personal staff of the council on prevention and countermeasures against legalization (laundering) of proceeds obtained through crime, financing of terrorism and proliferation of weapons of mass destruction.

On 10 October 2023, President Volodymyr Zelenskyy appointed Pronin as the governor of Poltava Oblast. On 31 December 2024, he was appointed Chairman of the State Financial Monitoring Service of Ukraine.
