= EU Asset Recovery Offices =

Asset recovery network in the EU

- EU Asset Recovery Offices Logo
- Formation: 2007
- Purpose: Recovering the financial gain from crime
- Region served: European Union
- Leader: EU Commission & Europol

The European (EU) Union Asset Recovery Offices (ARO) are national central contact points that facilitate EU-wide tracing of assets derived from crime.

Council Decision 2007/845/JHA (“The Decision”) obliges Member States to set up or designate such offices. It requests AROs to exchange information under the conditions laid down in Framework Decision 2006/960/JHA (“the Swedish Initiative”) and in compliance with the applicable data protection provisions.

The Decision is also intended to support the CARIN (Camden Assets Recovery Interagency Network), a global network aimed at enhancing mutual knowledge about methods and techniques for cross-border identification, freezing, seizure and confiscation of illicitly acquired assets.

Member States are required to ensure that AROs cooperate with each other and help facilitating the tracing and identification of proceeds of crime and other crime related assets by exchanging information and best practices, both upon request and spontaneously. The exchange of information and best practices between AROs should take place regardless of their status (administrative, law enforcement or judicial authority). The purpose of AROs is to remove the financial gain from crime.

== List of Member AROs ==
- Austria - Bundesministerium für Inneres - Bundeskriminalamt
- Belgium - Central Office for Seizure and Confiscation (COSC)
- Bulgaria - Commission for Illegal Assets Forfeiture (CIAF)
- Croatia - Criminal police directorate - National police for suppression of corruption and organised crime - Economic crime and corruption department
- Cyprus - MOKAS (Unit for Combating Money Laundering)
- (Czech Republic) Czechia - National Organized Crime Agency (NCOZ)
- Denmark - State Prosecutor for Serious Economic & International Crime - The Danish Asset Recovery Office
- Estonia - Asset Recovery Bureau - National Criminal Police -Police and Border Guard Board
- Finland - National Bureau of Investigation/ Criminal Investigation/Financial Crime Intelligence
- France
  - Central Directorate for Criminal Investigations - Platform for the identification of Criminal Assets (PIAC)
  - AGRASC (Agence de gestion et de recouvrement des avoirs saisis et confisqués) Agency for the recovery and management of seized and confiscated assets)
- Germany
- Greece
- Hungary
- (Republic of Ireland) Ireland - Criminal Assets Bureau
- Italy
- Latvia
- Lithuania
- Luxembourg
- Malta - Asset Recovery Bureau.
- Netherlands
- Poland
- Portugal
- Romania
- Slovakia
- Slovenia
- Spain Punto Nacional de Contacto para el intercambio de inteligencia e información en materia Localizacion y Recuperación de Activos (ORA) del Ministerio del Interior. Oficina de Recuperacion de Activos (CITCO-ORA)
- Sweden
- United Kingdom

== See also ==
- Egmont Group of Financial Intelligence Units
- Financial intelligence
- Money laundering
- Mutual legal assistance
- Justice and Home Affairs (JHA)
