= Bohdan Korolchuk =

Ukrainian politician

- Богдан Корольчук
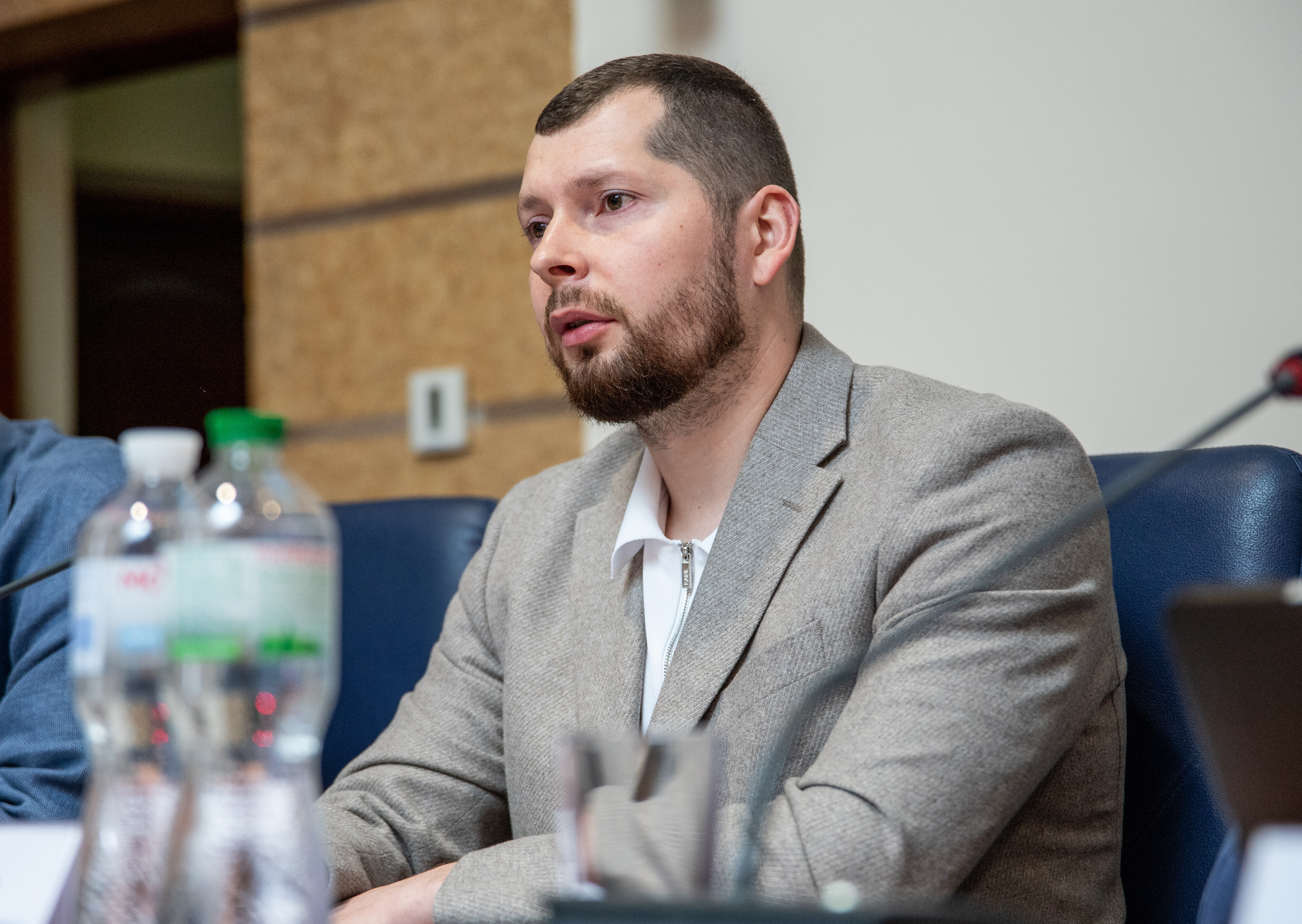

Governor of Poltava Oblast (acting)
- In office 30 December 2024 – February 2025
- Preceded by: Filip Pronin
- Succeeded by: Volodymyr Kohut (acting)

Personal details
- Born: Bohdan Leonidovych Korolchuk; 25 August 1992 (age 34) Ivankiv, Ukrainian SSR, Soviet Union

Bohdan Leonidovych Korolchuk (Ukrainian: Богдан Леонідович Корольчук; born 25 August 1992), is a Ukrainian politician and former police officer who has served as the acting Governor of Poltava Oblast since 30 December 2024.

Korolchuk had previously been the first deputy head of the Poltava Oblast State Administration. He is a Candidate of Law as of 2021.

== Biography ==
Bohdan Korolchuk was born in Ivankiv on 25 August 1992.

Between September 2009 and November 2015 Korolchuk served in the Ministry of Internal Affairs of Ukraine. In 2013, he graduated from the National Academy of Internal Affairs of Ukraine, with a bachelor degree in law. In 2015, he graduated from Taras Shevchenko National University of Kyiv, with a degree in law.

From November 2015 to November 2023, Korolchuk served in the National Police of Ukraine, where he was the deputy chief - the head of the investigative department at Boryspil International Airport, and the deputy chief of Poltava Oblast police department of the National Police, and the head of the investigative department. Since December 2023, Korolchuk was the First Deputy Head of the Poltava Regional State Administration. On 30 December 2024, Korolchuk became the acting Governor of Poltava Oblast, succeeding Filip Pronin.

== Family ==
Korolchuk is married to Tatiyana Korolchuk. The couple has three daughters: Polina, Miya and Tey.
