= Andrey Korolchuk =

Russian painter

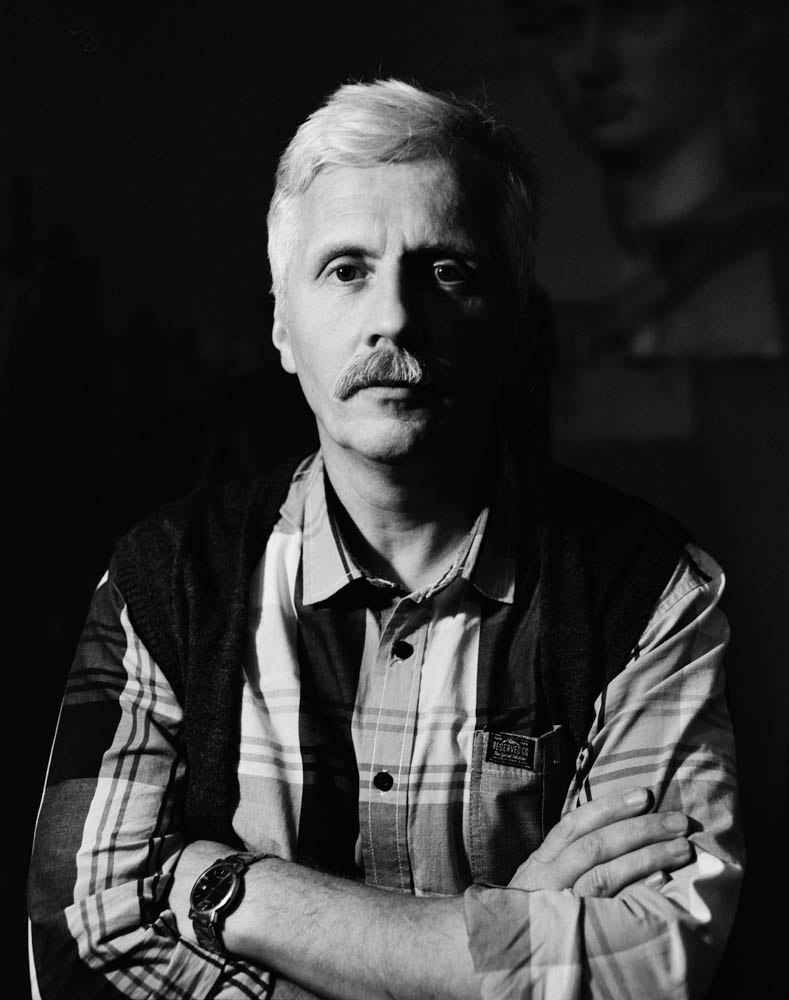
- Born: Andrey Alexandrovich Korolchuk; November 6, 1961 (age 64); Leningrad, Soviet Union
- Education: Herzen University, Imperial Academy of Arts
- Known for: Painting, Graphics
- Notable work: Website
- Movement: arts

Andrey Alexandrovich Korolchuk (Russian: Андрей Александрович Корольчýк; born November 6, 1961) is a Soviet and Russian painter, graphic artist, printmaker, book artist, teacher.

== Biography ==
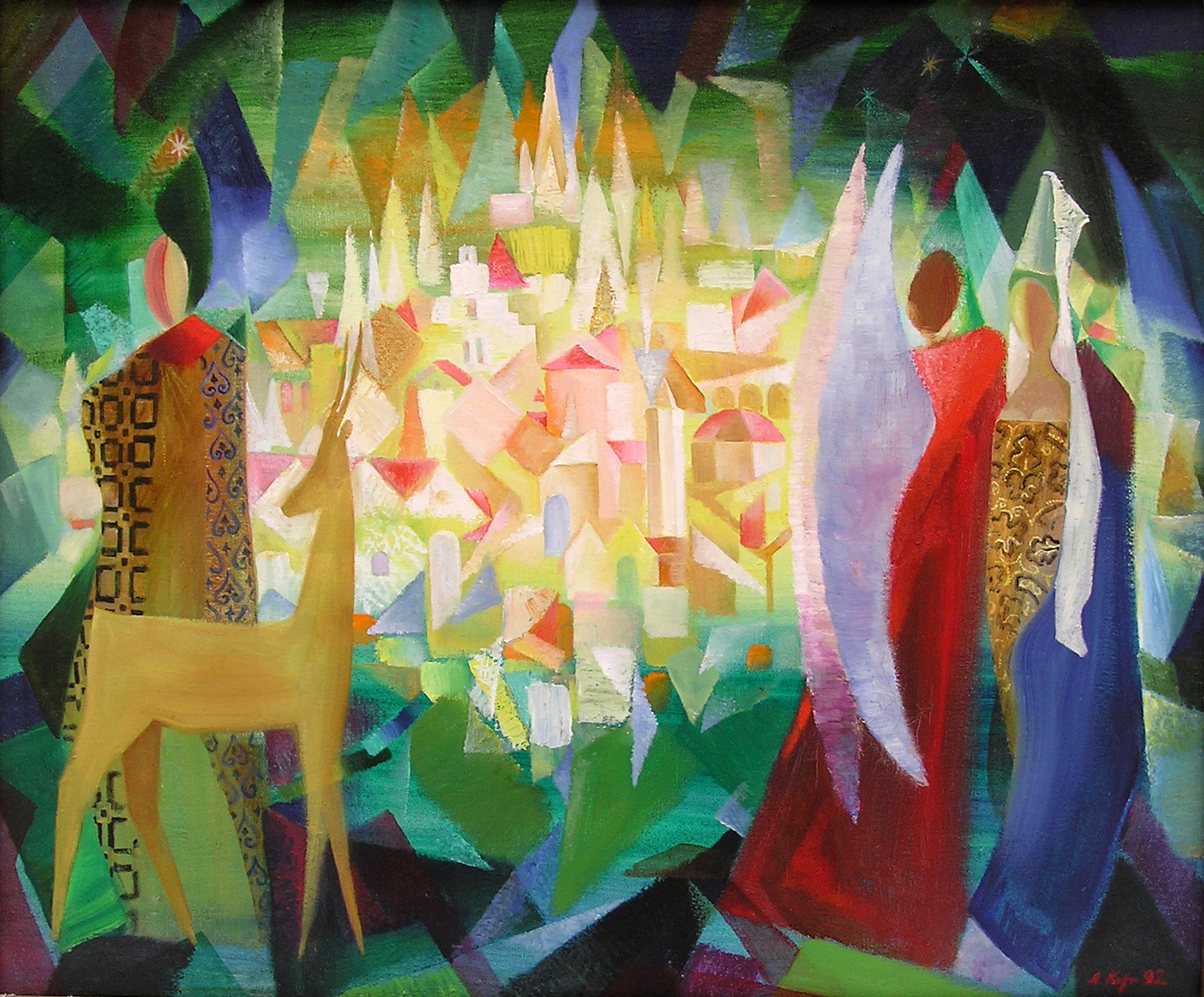
City-legend, 1992, oil on canvas, 97 cm × 116 cm

Korolchuk graduated from City Art School in Leningrad in 1979. He studied at Graphic Art Department of Leningrad State Pedagogical Institute named after A.I. Herzen from 1979 to 1982 and graduated from Institute of Painting, Sculpture and Architecture named after Repin in 1987. Recipient of medal "For the best diploma work" of USSR Fine Arts Academy.

Member of the Graphics Section Saint Petersburg Union of Artists (since 1992), and member of the Board of the Saint Petersburg Union of Artists (2016–2019). Vice-Chairman of St. Petersburg Watercolorists’ Society (since 1994). Participant of more than 400 exhibitions in Russia and abroad, 42 of which are personal (since 1986).

Teaching experience—Russian State Pedagogical University named after A.I. Herzen (since 1988), associate professor, Drawing Department. Participant of interregional and foreign plein airs and workshops. Project member: City as an Artist's Subjectivity (2020).

Lives and works in St. Petersburg.

== Museum collections ==
The artist's works are in the following museum collections/ State Catalogue of the Museum Fund of Russia:

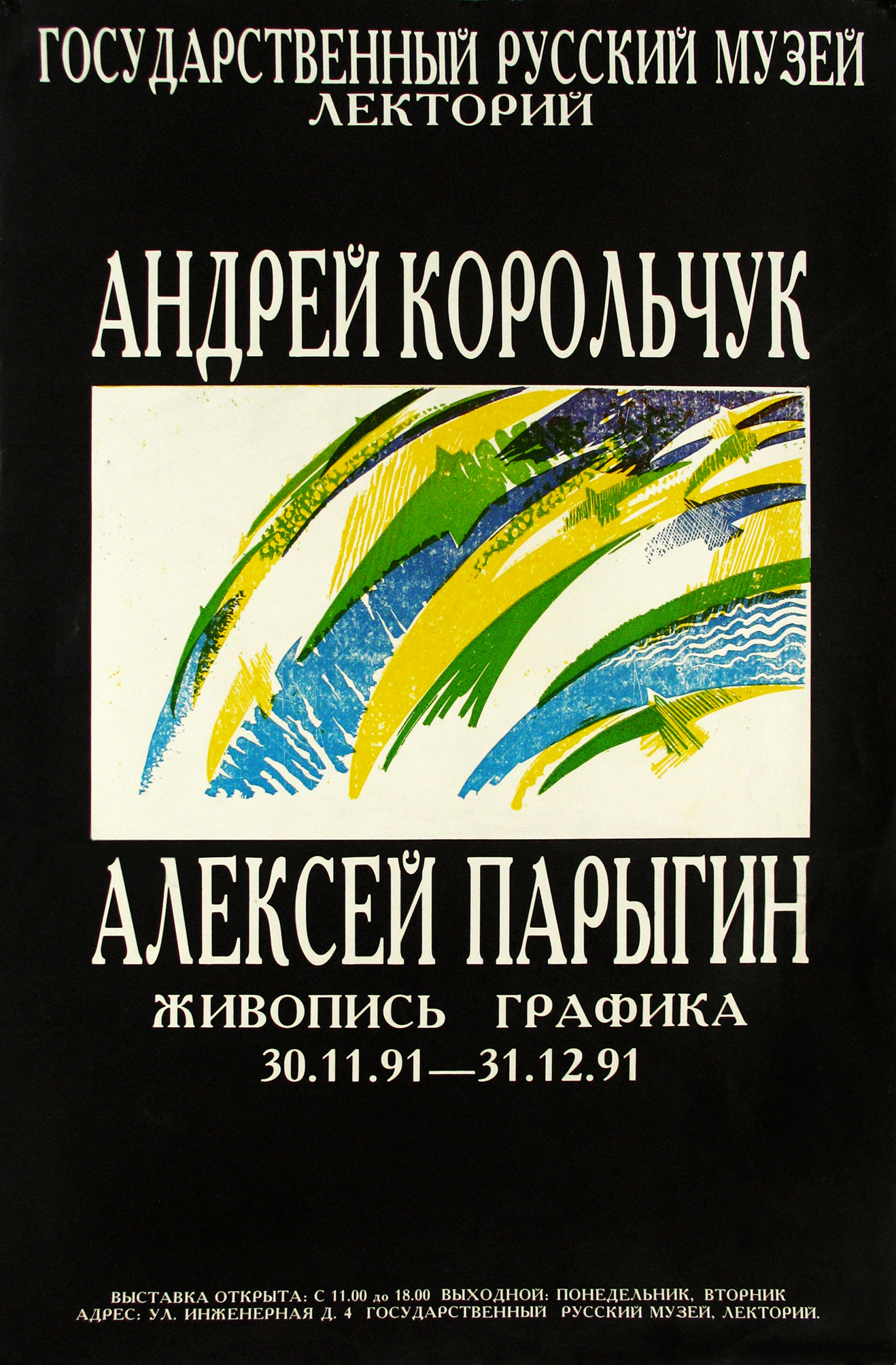
An. Korolchuk. Russian Museum exhibition poster. 1991

- Hermitage Museum. Hermitage Academic Library/ Rare Books and Manuscripts Sector. (St. Petersburg).
- Russian Museum. Department of engraving XVIII-XXI centuries. (St. Petersburg)
- National Library of Russia. Department of Prints (St. Petersburg)
- Pushkin Museum. Science Library/ Rare Books Dept. (Moscow)
- Garage Museum of Contemporary Art. (Moscow). Library/ Artist's Books Dept.
- Hermitage-Vyborg Center (Vyborg)
- A.S. Popov Central Museum of Communications (St. Petersburg)
- Peterhof State Museum Reserve
- Scientific Research Museum of Russian Academy of Arts (St. Petersburg)
- State Museum Majdanek (Lublin, Poland)
- Municipal Museum (Penkun, Germany)
- Municipal Museum (Blankensee, Germany
- University of Northern Iowa Gallery (USA)
- Municipal Museum (Malchin, Germany)
- Queen Louise Museum in Hohenzieritz (Germany)
- Sviyazhsk State Museum of Architecture and Art (Republic of Tatarstan)
- Dukhovshchina District Museum of History and Arts (Dukhovshchina)
- Kizhi State Reserve Museum of History and Architecture
- Kurgan Regional Art Museum, Museum of Russian State Pedagogical University named after A.I. Herzen

== Bibliography ==
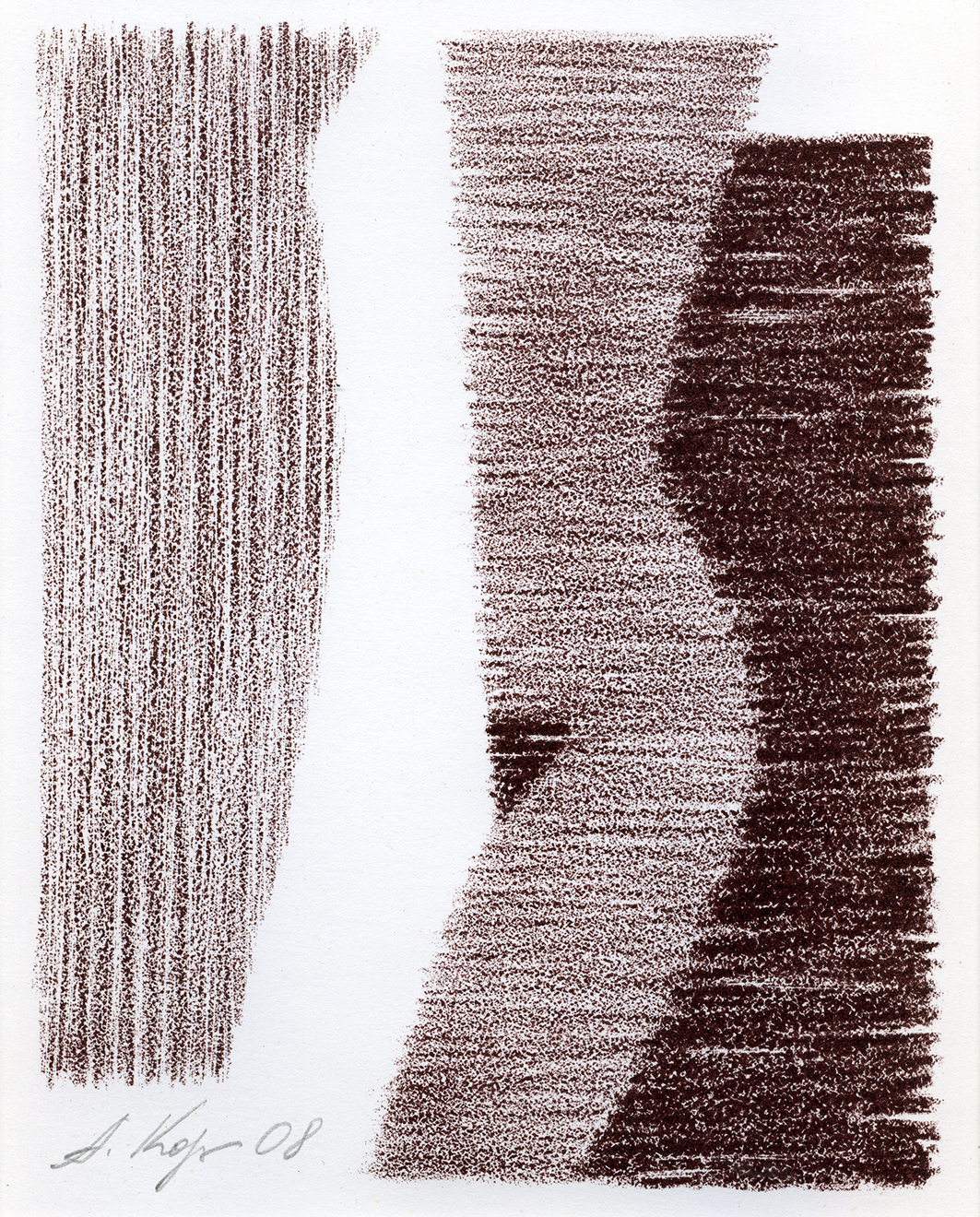
An. Korolchuk. Silhouette 4. 2008, lithography

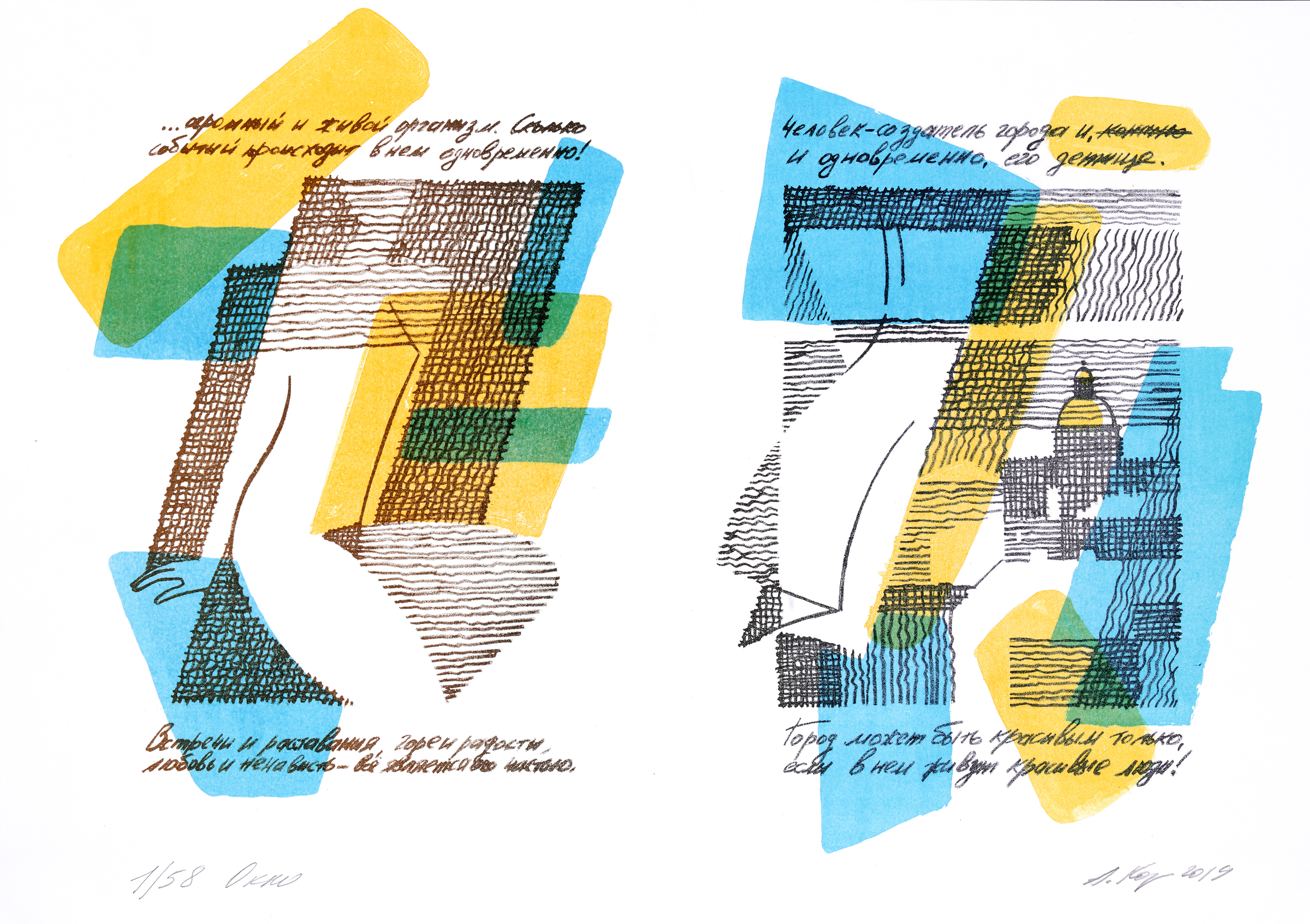
The Mirage City (for the project City as an Artist's Subjectivity). 2019, lithography

- Коллекция экслибрисов в фундаментальной библиотеке Герценовского университета / сост.: С. Е. Волоскова и др. СПб: РГПУ им. А.И. Герцена, 2022. — 60 с., цв.ил. — С. 56 ISBN 978-58064-3197-5
- Parygin Alexey A City as an Artist's Subjectivity / Artist’s Book Yearbook 2022-2023. Edited by Sarah Bodman. Bristol: CFPR (Centre for Fine Print Research). University of the West of England, 2022. 292 pp. ISBN 978-1-906501-22-8
- Кононихин Н. Ленинградская школа литографии. Путь длиною в век. СПб: М. Frants Art Foundation. — 2021. — 360 с., цв. ил. С. — 140. ISBN 978-5-6046274-4-0
- City as Artist's subjectivity. Artist's book project. Catalog. Authors of the articles: Parygin A.B., Markov T.A., Klimova E.D., Borovsky A.D., Severyukhin D.Ya., Grigoryants E.I., Blagodatov N.I. (Rus & En) SPb: Ed. T. Markova. 2020. 128 p. P. 5. ISBN 978-5-906281-32-6
- Parygin A. B. Korol'čuk A. A. // Allgemeines Künstlerlexikon Die Bildenden Künstler aller Zeiten und Völker. De Gruyter. Band 81. 2013.
- Fl. Russische Maler stellen aus // Pasewalker Zeitung. 2004. 11 August.
- Gerhardt K. Ausstellung mit Arbeiten von russischen Künstlern im Rathaus und in der Sparkasse der Stadt Strasburg (Um.) // Strasburger Anzeiger. 2004. August. Nr. 8.
- Bohm S. Russische Maler setzen Stadt in Szene // Pasewalker Zeitung. 2004. 14-15 August.
- Rückkehr nach Russland // Pasewalker Zeitung. 2004. August.
- Lucius Maler verabschiedet // Pasewalker Zeitung. 2004 August. Freitag, 27.
- Marten R. Museumsverein begrüsst erneut russische Maler. Pasewalker Zeitung. 2002. 7 August.
- Marten R. Maler verewigen Orte der Region // AK der anzeigenkurier. 2002. 21 August.
- Moller K. Bilder in Aquarell zeigen Grenzgebiet // Pasewalker Zeitung. 2002. 17-18. August.
- Nitsch R. Künstler spenden für die Flut-Opfer // 2002. August.
- Nitsh R. Russische Maler neu entdeckt // Pasewalker Zeitung, 2009. 7 November.
- Жаворонкова С. Вступительная статья // Буклет выставки Корольчука, Парыгина в Лектории Государственного Русского музея. 1991.

== Gallery of works ==
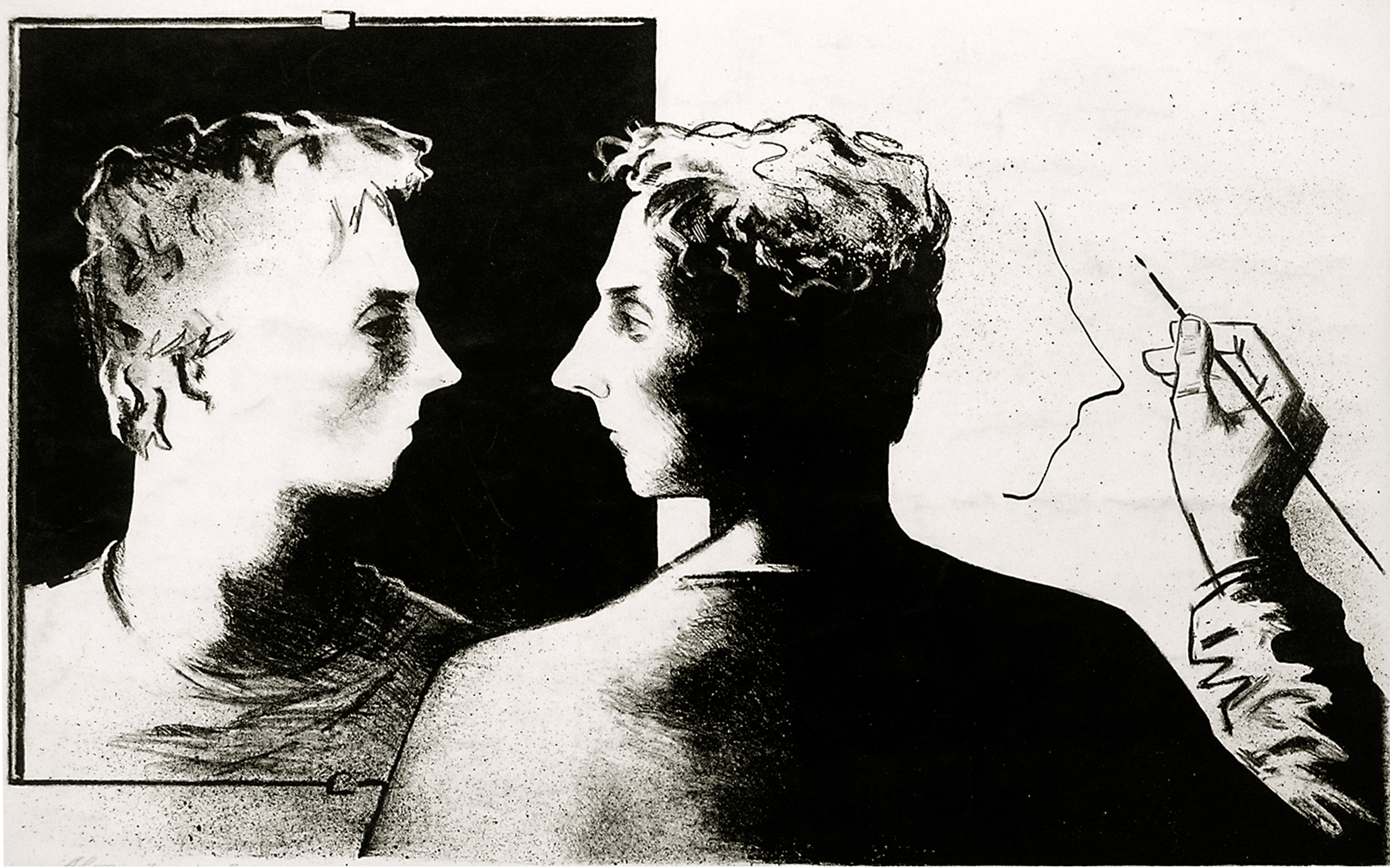
Self-Portrait. 1986

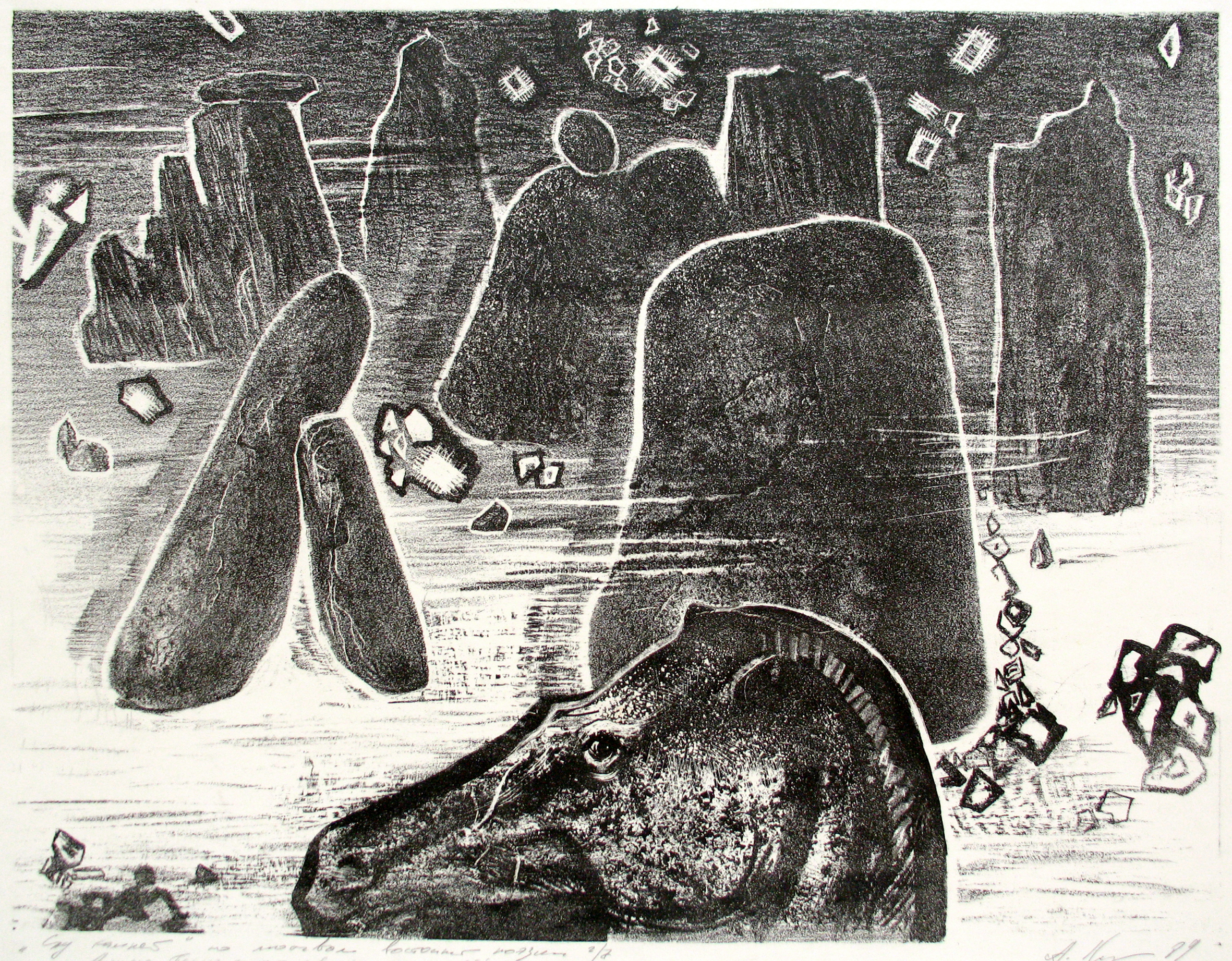
Garden of stones. 1989

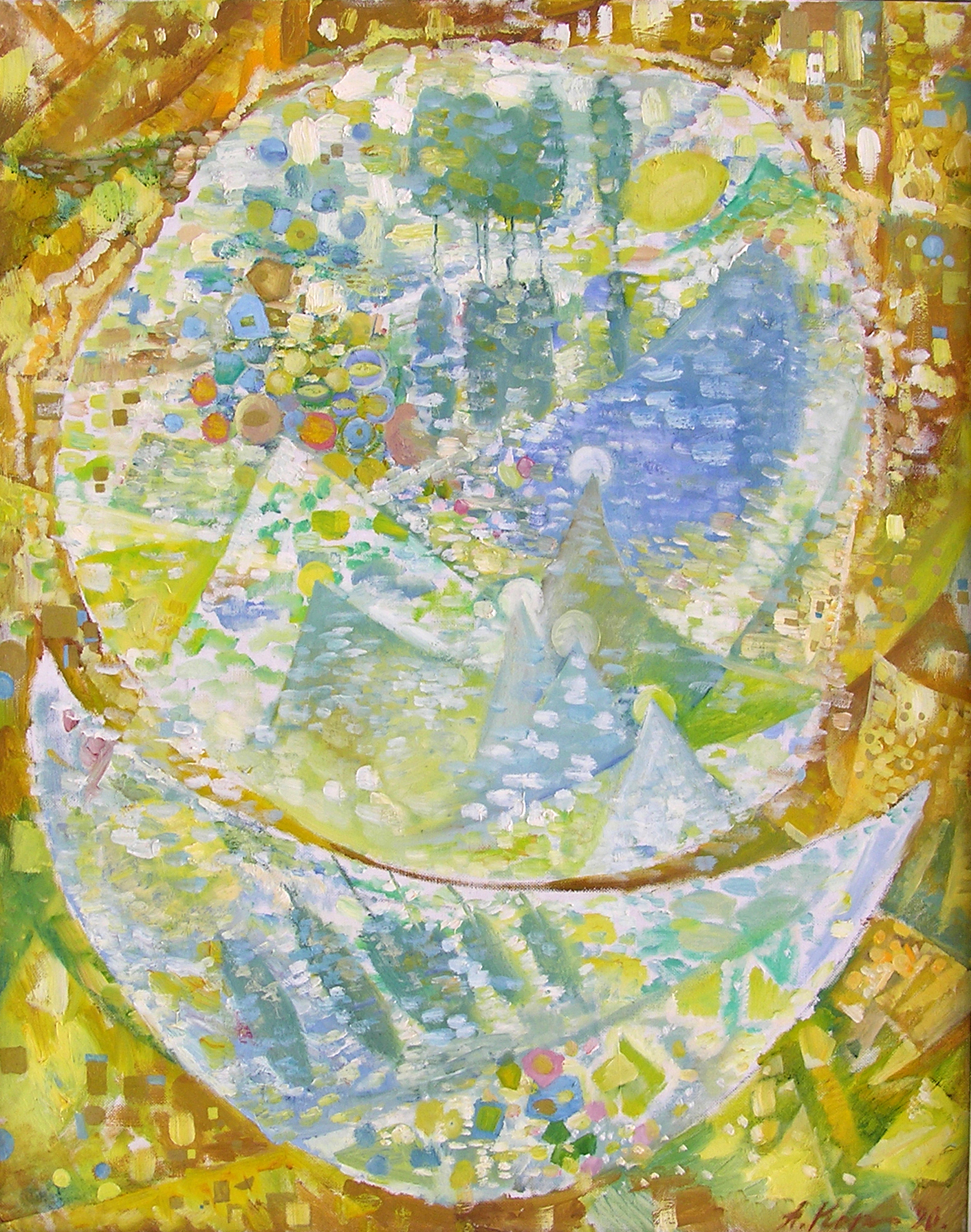
Morning transformations. 1990

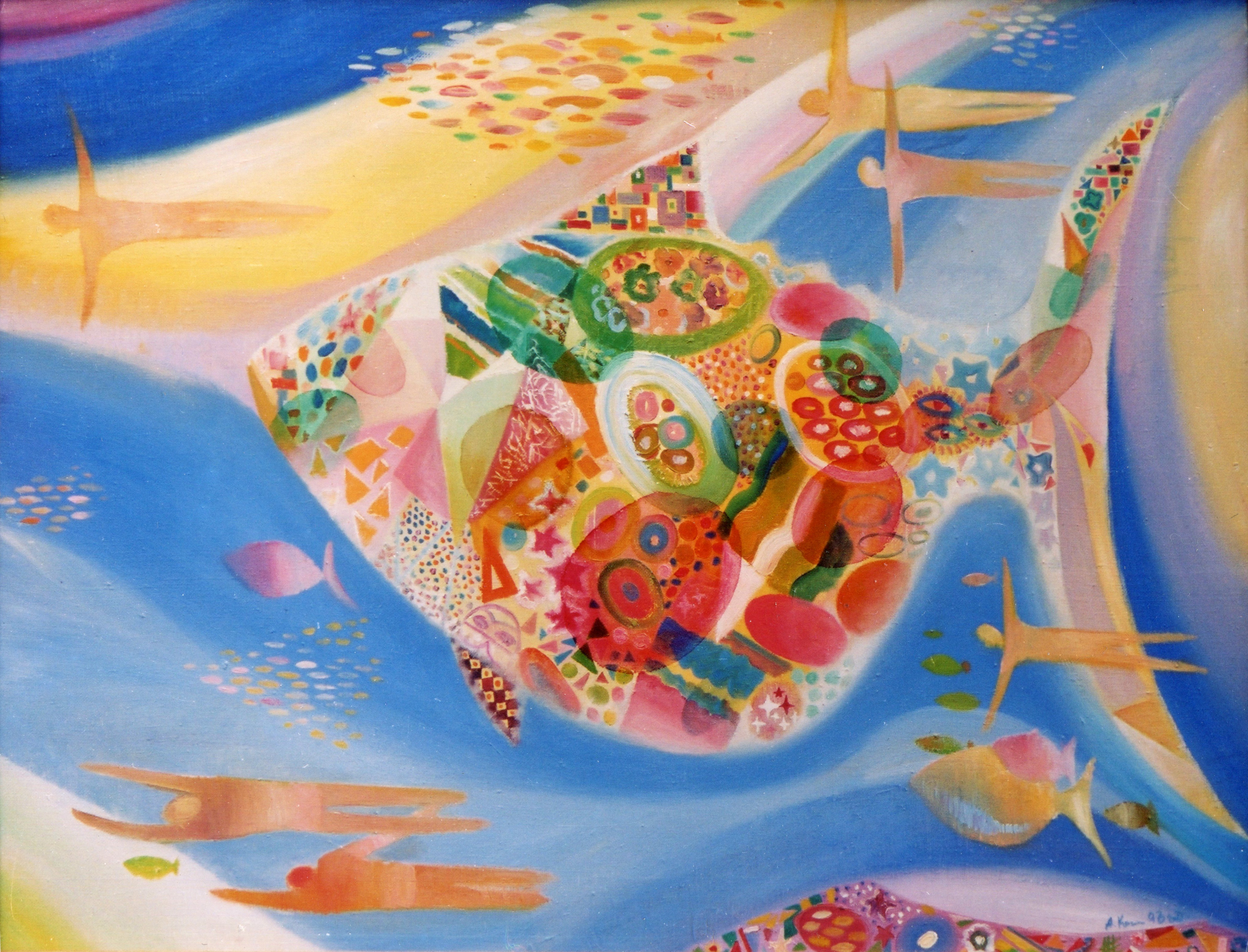
Big fish. 1993

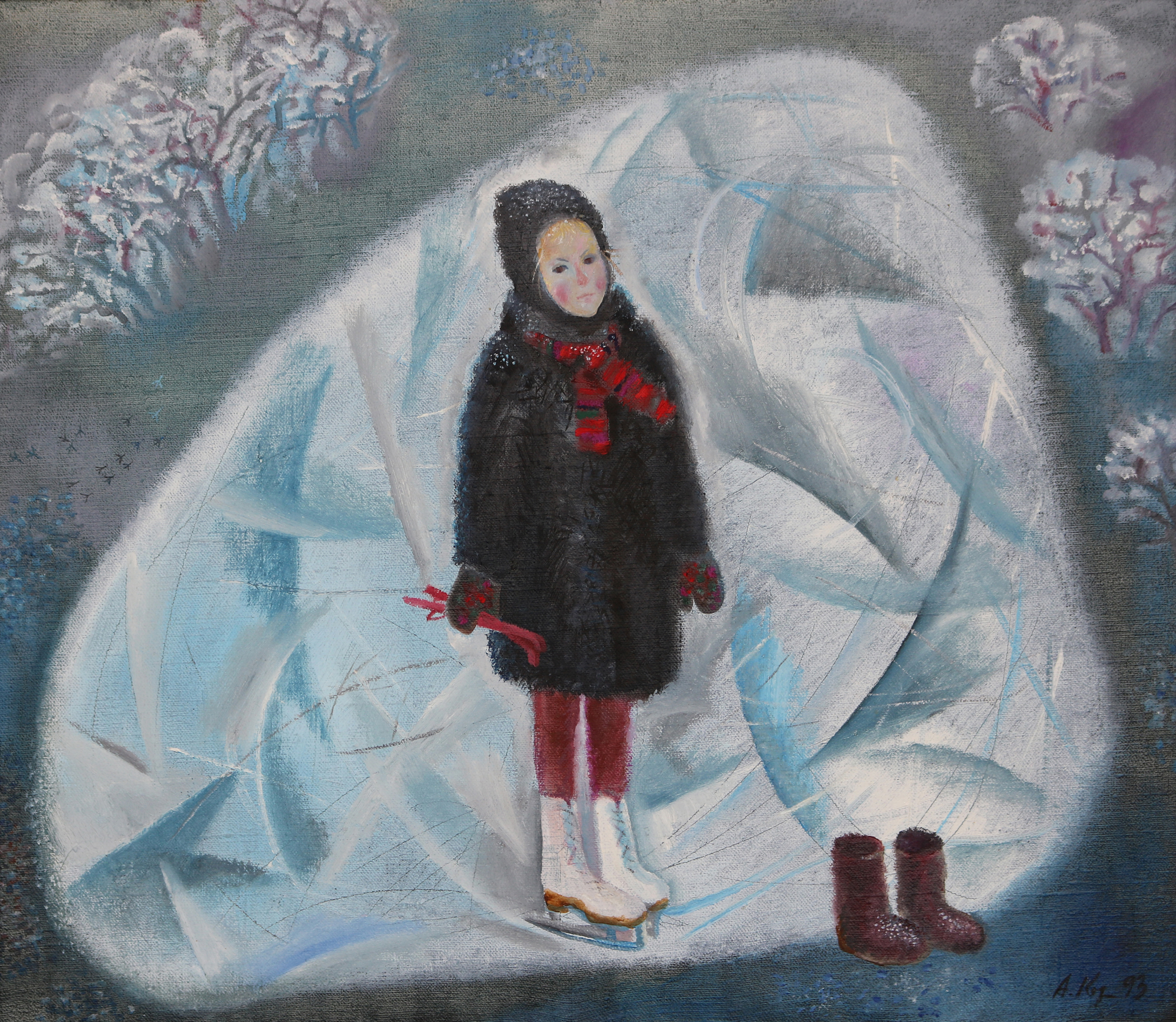
Figure skater. 1994

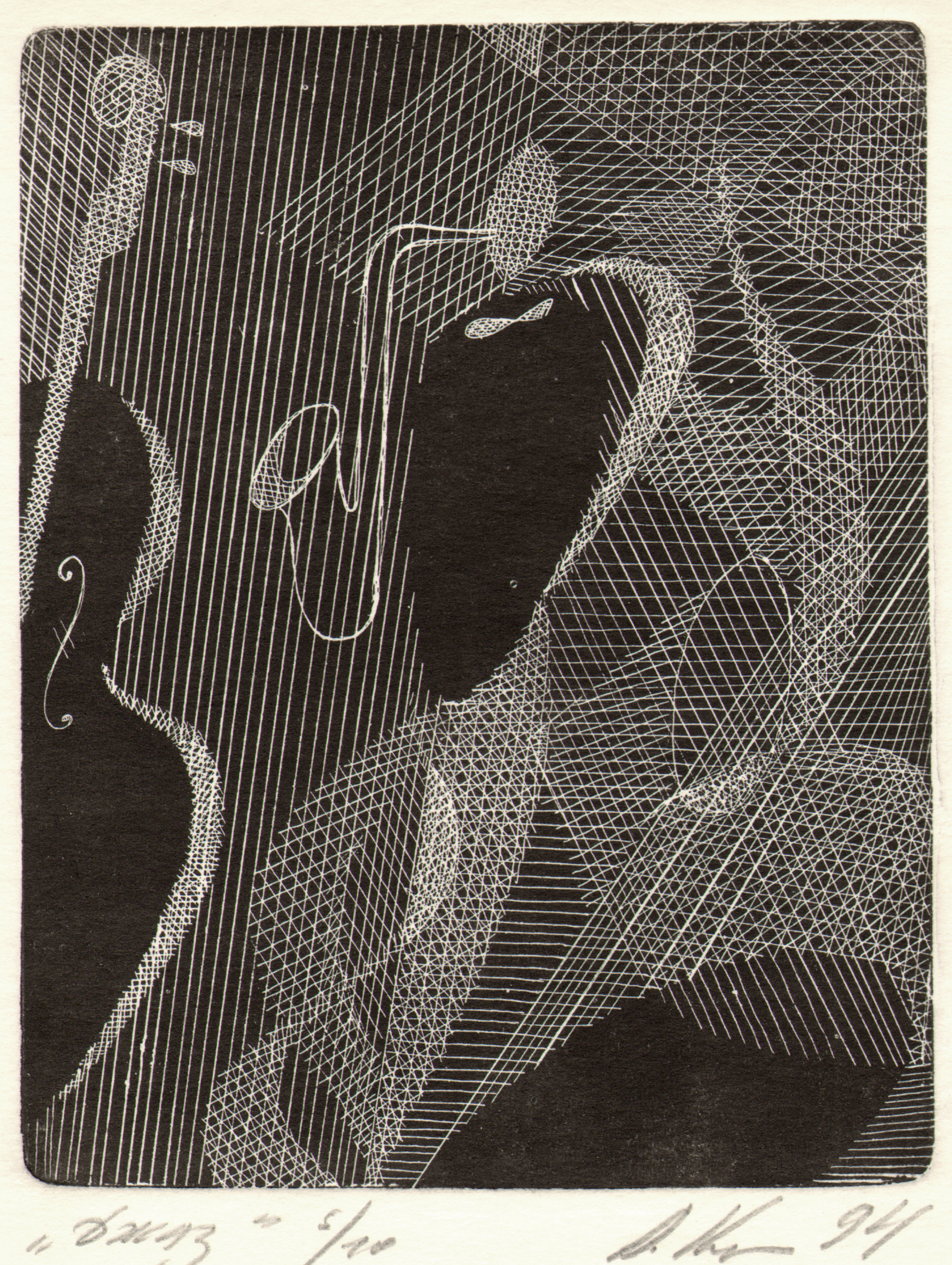
Jazz. 1994

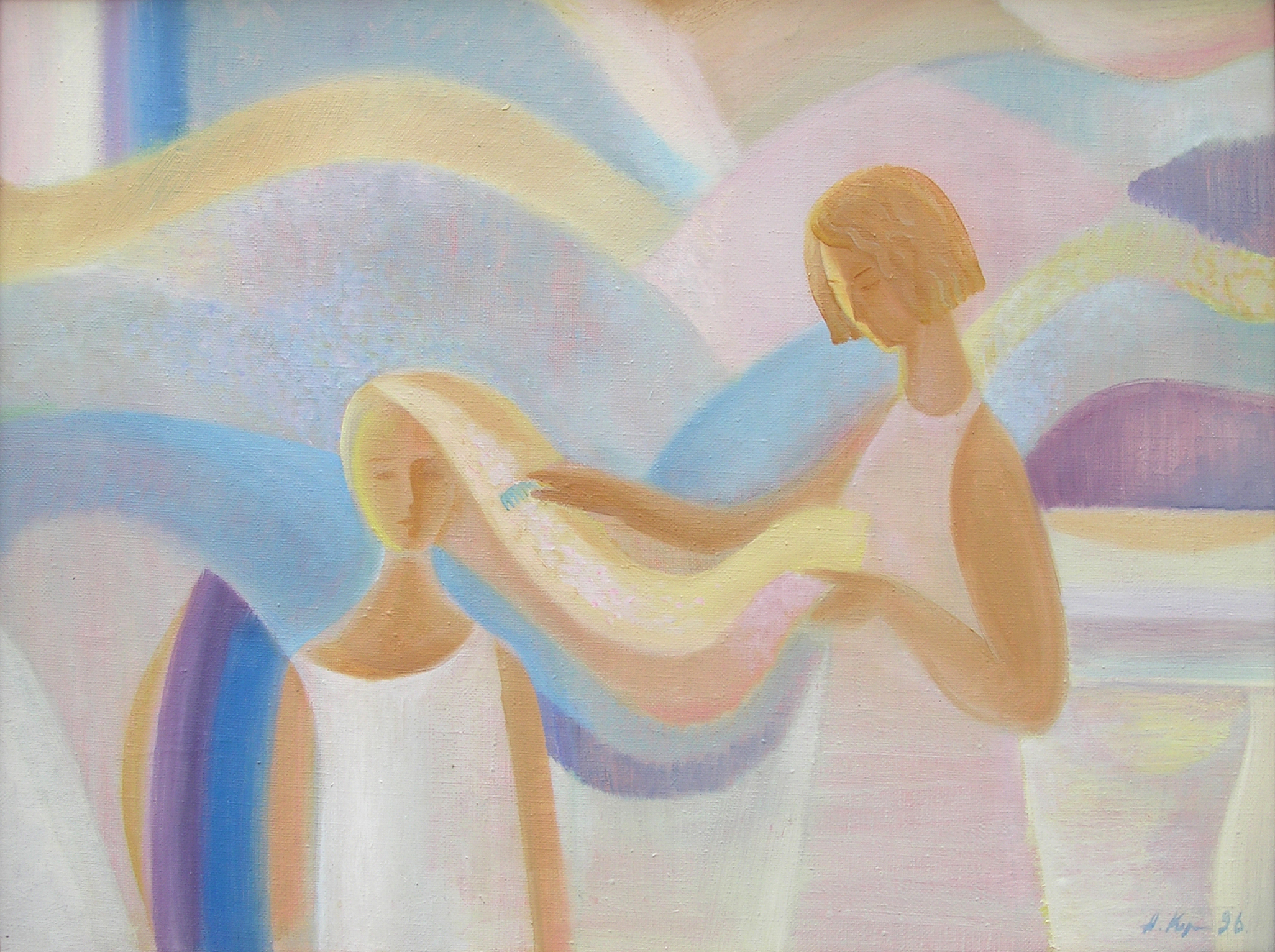
Morning. 1996

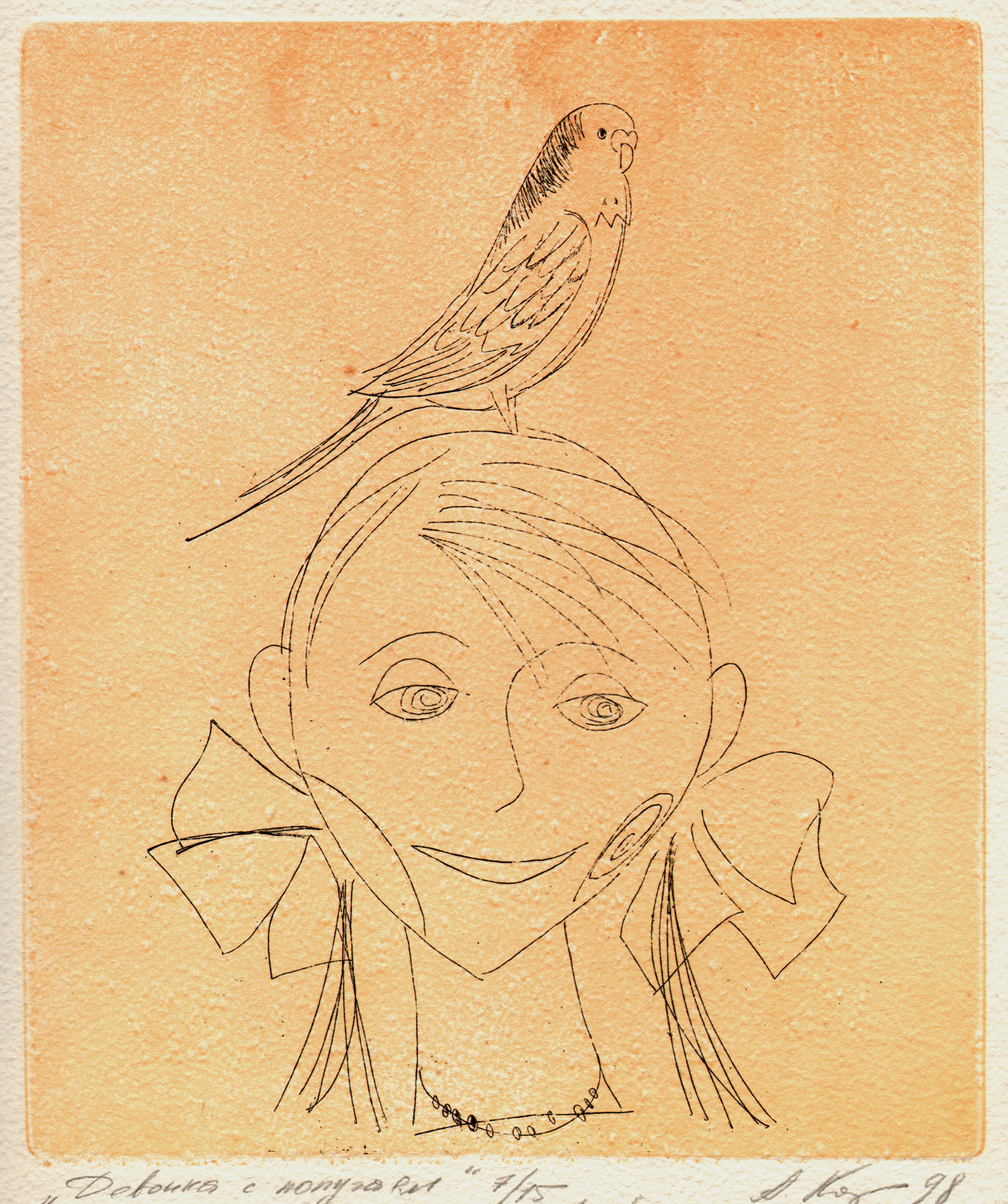
Girl with a parrot. 1998

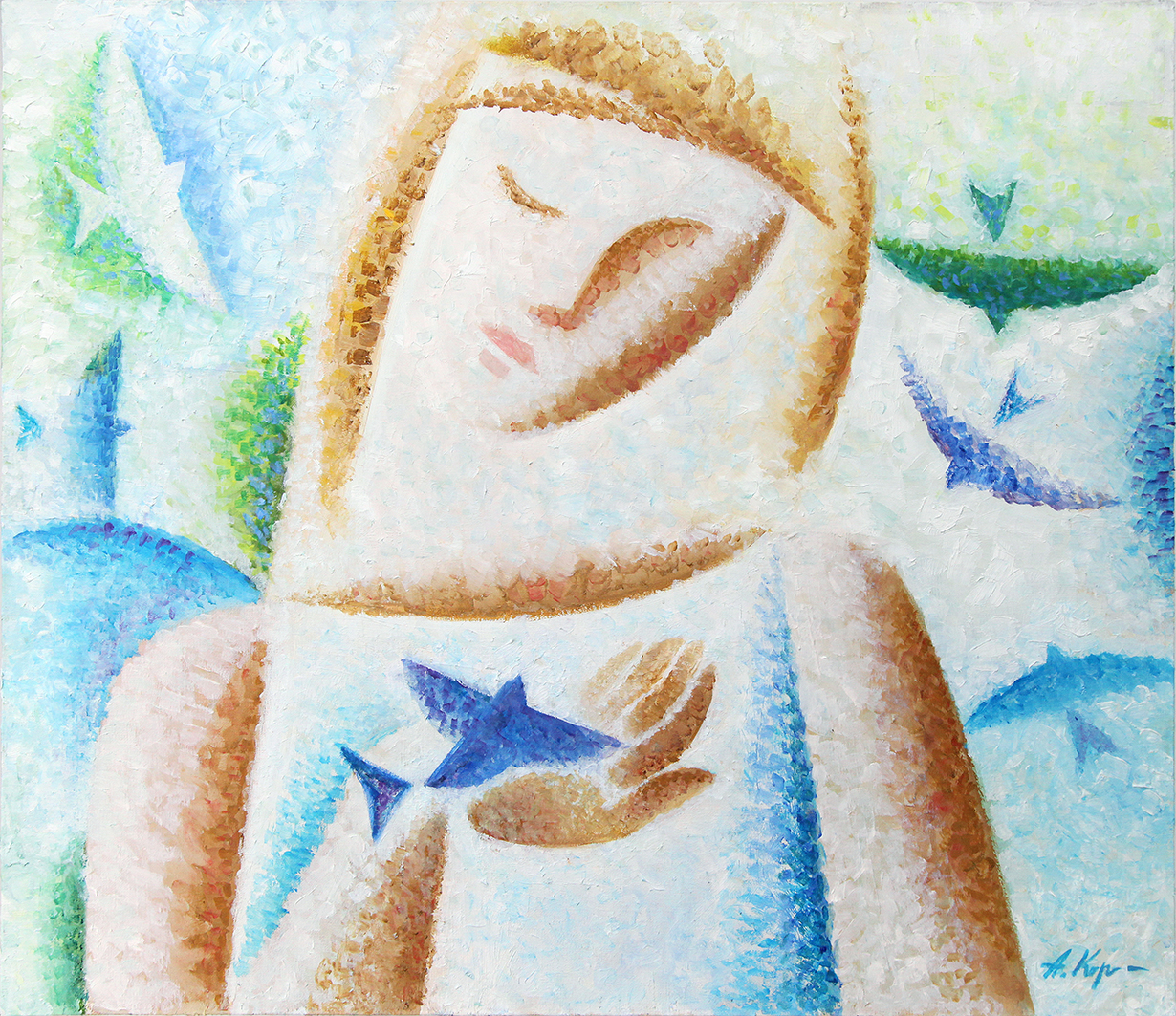
Girl and birds. 2014
