= Timeline of Odesa =

The following is a timeline of the history of the city of Odesa, Ukraine.

Timeline of Odesa

Grand Duchy of Lithuania 1415–84
Ottoman Empire 1484–1789
Russian Empire 1789–1917

1917-1922 Revolution

Russian Provisional Government 1917
UPR Dec 1917–Nov 1918
OSR Jan–March 1918
Ukrainian State March–Dec 1918
AFSR Dec 1918–April 1919
PWPGU/ UkSSR April–Aug 1919
AFSR Aug 1919–Feb 1920
// UkSSR Feb 1920–Dec 1922

USSR 1922–41
Kingdom of Romania (occupation) 1941–44
USSR 1944–91
Ukraine 1991–present

== 13th to 17th century ==
- 1240 – Tatars begin settling herds in the region.
- 1415 – A settlement of Kachibei (Khadjibey, Hacıbey, Kotsiubiyiv) was first mentioned.
- 15th century – Khadjibey ceded to Lithuania.
- 1529 – Ottoman conquest.

== 18th century ==
- 1764 – Fortress Yeni Dünya built at Khadjibey by Turks.
- 1789 – Russian forces take fortress.
- 1791 – Khadjibey annexed to Novorossiya.
- 1794 – Odesa founded by decree of Catherine II of Russia.
- 1795
  - Population: 2,250.
  - Cathedral of the Transfiguration founded.

== 19th century ==
- 1802 – Population: 9,000.
- 1803 – Duc de Richelieu in power.
- 1804 – Commercial school founded.
- 1805
  - Odesa becomes administrative center of New Russia.
  - Theatre opens.
  - Russian Orthodox church built.
- 1808 – Troitzkaya Church active.
- 1809
  - Cathedral built.
  - Opera house built.
- 1812 – Plague.
- 1814 – Population: 25,000.
- 1816 – Louis Alexandre Andrault de Langeron in power.
- 1817 – Richelieu Lyceum established.
- 1819 – Odesa becomes a free port.
- 1821
  - Church of the Dormition built.
  - Pogrom against Jews.
- 1824 – Odesa becomes "seat of the governors-general of Novorossia and Bessarabia".
- 1825 – Archeological Museum founded.
- 1826
  - Fyodor Palen in power.
  - Jewish school established.
  - Richelieu Monument unveiled.
- 1828 – Imperial Rural Association for Southern Russia founded.
- 1830
  - Public library established.
  - Vorontsov Palace built.
- 1838 – Plague.
- 1841 – Giant Staircase constructed.
- 1846 - Londonska Hotel opens.
- 1847 – Novobazarnaya Church built.
- 1850 – Population: 100,000.
- 1853
  - Crimean War begins.
  - Roman Catholic Church rebuilt.

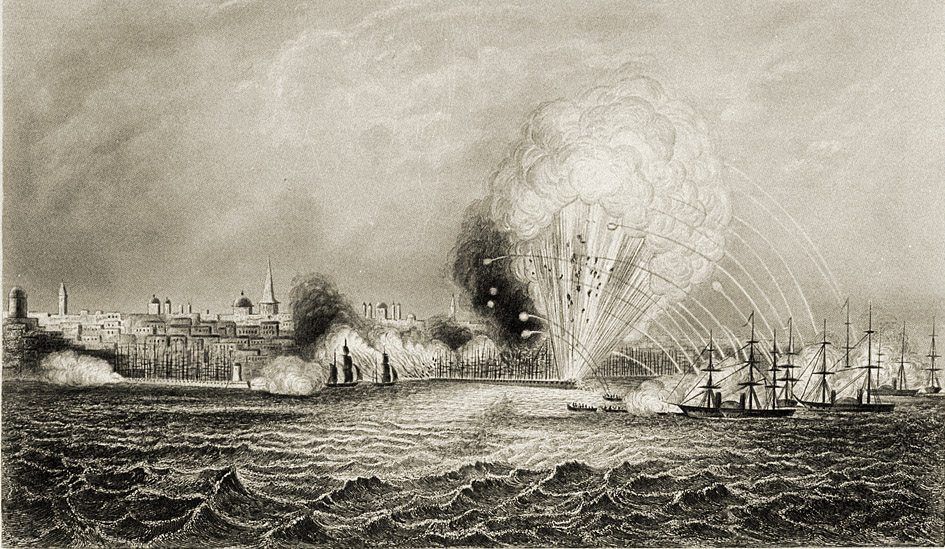
Bombardment of Odesa, 1854

- 1854 – Anglo-French fleet attacks Odesa.
- 1856 – Russian Steam Navigation and Trading Company established.
- 1857 – August 15: Free port status revoked.
- 1859 – Pogrom against Jews.
- 1862
  - Odesa Military District established.
  - Vorontsov Lighthouse built.
- 1865 – Imperial Novorossiya University established.
- 1866 – Odesa–Balta railway begins operating.
- 1871
  - Pogrom against Jews.
  - Russian Technical Society, Odesa branch, founded.
- 1873 – Population: 162,814.
- 1874 – Theatre Velikanova built.
- 1875 – Tzar visits Odesa.
- 1876 – Turkish forces attack Odesa.
- 1880 – Horse tramway begins operating.
- 1881
  - Steam tramway begins operating.
  - Pogrom against Jews.
- 1882 – Population: 217,000.
- 1887 – Theatre built.
- 1894 – Odesa Committee of the Social Democratic Workers Party organized.
- 1895 – St. Panteleimon church consecrated.

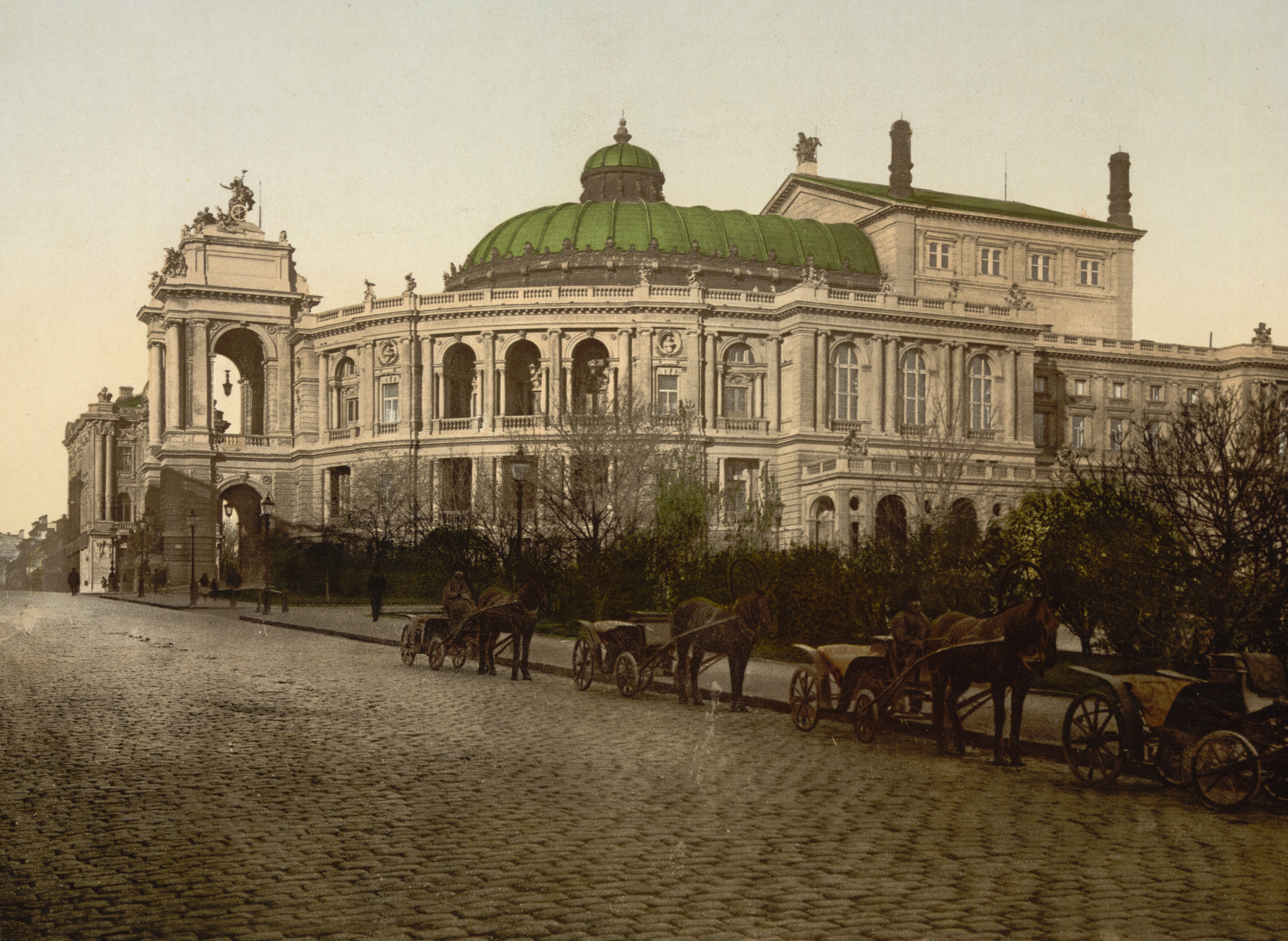
Odesa Opera and Ballet Theatre in 1896

- 1897 – Lutheran Church built.
- 1899
  - General Post Office built.
  - Exchange built.
  - Bristol Hotel opens.
- 1900 – Population: 449,673.

== 20th century ==
- 1902 – Cadet School active.
- 1905
  - June: Potemkin uprising.
  - Pogrom against Jews.
- 1906
  - Uprising.
  - Municipal Library built.
- 1907 – Myrograph film studio in business.
- 1910
  - Electric Tram begins operating.
  - Trade fair held.
- 1913
  - Conservatoire founded.
  - Sergiyev Artillery School active.
  - Population: 631,040.
- 1917 – City occupied by Ukrainian Tsentral'na Rada, French Army, Red Army, and White Army following the Bolshevik Revolution.
- 1918
  - 13 March: Odesa occupied by Central Powers.
  - Odesa becomes capital of Odesa Soviet Republic.
  - Polytechnic University established.
  - December: Odesa occupied by the French Army
  - Consulate of Poland opened.
- 1919 – Odesa Film Studio founded.
- 1920 – Red Army in power.
- 1921 – Odesa State Economics University established.
- 1922
  - Odesa State Medical Institute established.
  - Odesa Zoo opens.
- 1924 – Odesa Philharmonic Theater opens.
- 1926 – State Odesa Russian Drama Theatre established.
- 1928 – Spartak Stadium opens.
- 1933 – School of Stolyarsky established.
- 1935 – Kosior Memorial Stadium built.
- 1936
  - The Filatov Institute of Eye Diseases & Tissue Therapy founded.
  - Dynamo football club formed.
- 1937 – Mass murder of around 1,000 Poles during the Polish Operation of the NKVD.
- 1941
  - August 8-October 16: Siege of Odesa.
  - October 17: Axis occupation begins.
  - October 22–24: 1941 Odesa massacre.
  - Odesa becomes capital of Romanian-administered Transnistria Governorate.
- 1944
  - April 10: Red Army takes city; Axis occupation ends.
  - ODO Odesa football team active.
  - Odesa State Maritime Academy founded.
- 1945 – Odesa designated a Hero City of the USSR.
- 1952 – Railway Station rebuilt.
- 1961
  - Odesa International Airport built.
  - Pushkin Museum opens.
- 1963 – Avangard rugby club formed.
- 1965 – Population: 735,000.
- 1973 – April 10: Humorina festival begins.
- 1979 – Population: 1,072,000.
- 1984 – Deribasivska Street pedestrianized.
- 1985 – Population: 1,126,000.
- 1989 – Outdoor market relocates to Odesa-Ovidiopol highway.
- 1992 – BIPA-Moda basketball club formed.
- 1994
  - Eduard Gurwits becomes mayor.
  - New music festival begins.
- 1998 – Rouslan Bodelan becomes mayor.
- 1999 – Odesa Numismatics Museum established.
- 2000 – Quarantine Pier designated free economic zone and port.

== 21st century ==
- 2001 – Al-Salam Mosque opens.
- 2003 – Rebuilt Odesa Cathedral consecrated.
- 2005 – Eduard Gurwits becomes mayor again.
- 2007 – Pryvoz Market rebuilt.
- 2010 – Odesa International Film Festival begins.
- 2011
  - Chornomorets Stadium built.
  - FC SKA Odesa formed.
  - Aleksey Kostusyev becomes mayor.
  - Population: 1,003,705.
- 2014 – 2014 Odesa clashes.
- 2014 – after Crimea annexation by Russia, Odesa become the main naval base of the Armed Forces of Ukraine.
- 2018 – Population: 993,831 (estimate).
- 2022 – Odesa is being constantly shelled by Russian missiles and the Odesa port is blocked.
- 2025 – On 15 October 2025 on Ukrainian president Volodymyr Zelenskyy decreed that Odesa had been placed under a city military administration headed by Serhiy Lysak. This happens after Mayor of Odesa Hennadii Trukhanov is removed from office due to him having a Russian passport.

== See also ==
- Odesa history
- History of the Jews in Odesa
- List of mayors of Odesa

== Bibliography ==
Published before 1950

- Dearborn, H. A. S. (1819), "Odesa", A Memoir on the Commerce and Navigation of the Black Sea, Boston: Wells & Lilly
- Sicard, Charles (1819), An Account of Odesa, Newport, R.I., USA: Printed by William Simons, OL 24661988M
- Bremner, Robert (1840), "Odesa", Excursions in the interior of Russia (2nd ed.), London: H. Colburn
- "Odesa", Hand-book for Northern Europe; including Denmark, Norway, Sweden, Finland, and Russia (New ed.), London: John Murray, 1849
- de Demidoff, Anatole (1853), "Odesa", Travels in southern Russia and the Crimea, London: J. Mitchell, OCLC 14437725
- Alden, Henry Mills; Allen, Frederick Lewis; Hartman, Lee Foster; Wells, Thomas Bucklin (1854). "The Steppes, Odessa, and the Crimea". Harper's New Monthly Magazine.
- Koch, Charles W. (1855), The Crimea: with a visit to Odessa, London: Routledge, OCLC 12097882, OL 23534204M
- "Odesa". Hand-book for Travellers in Russia, Poland, and Finland (2nd ed.). London: John Murray. 1868.
- McCulloch, John Ramsay (1877), "Odesa", in Reid, Hugh G. (ed.), A Dictionary, Practical, Theoretical and Historical of Commerce and Commercial Navigation, London: Longmans, Green, and Co., hdl:2027/njp.32101079877088 – via HathiTrust
- Meakin, Annette M. B. (1906). "Odessa". Russia, Travels and Studies. London: Hurst and Blackett. OCLC 3664651.
- Kropotkin, Peter Alexeivitch; Bealby, John Thomas (1910). "Odessa" . Encyclopædia Britannica. Vol. 20 (11th ed.). pp. 3–4.
- Curtis, William Eleroy (1911). "Odesa". Around the Black Sea. New York: Hodder & Stoughton. hdl:2027/uc2.ark:/13960/t3222tf2d.
- Wood, Ruth Kedzie (1912). "Odesa". The Tourist's Russia. New York: Dodd, Mead and Company. OCLC 526774.
- "Odesa". Russia. Leipzig: Karl Baedeker. 1914. OCLC 1328163.

Published since 1950

- Dzhumyga, Ievgen. "The Home Front In Odessa During The Great War (July 1914–February 1917): The Gender Aspect Of The Problem." Danubius 31 (2013):pp 223+ online
- Herlihy, Patricia (1973). "Odessa: Staple Trade and Urbanization in New Russia". Jahrbücher für Geschichte Osteuropas. Neue Folge, Bd. 21.
- Zipperstein, Steve J. (1982). "Jewish Enlightenment in Odessa: Cultural Characteristics, 1794-1871". Jewish Social Studies. 44 (1): 19–36. JSTOR 4467153.
- Herlihy, Patricia. "The ethnic composition of the city of Odessa in the nineteenth century." Harvard Ukrainian Studies 1.1 (1977): 53–78.

== Images ==
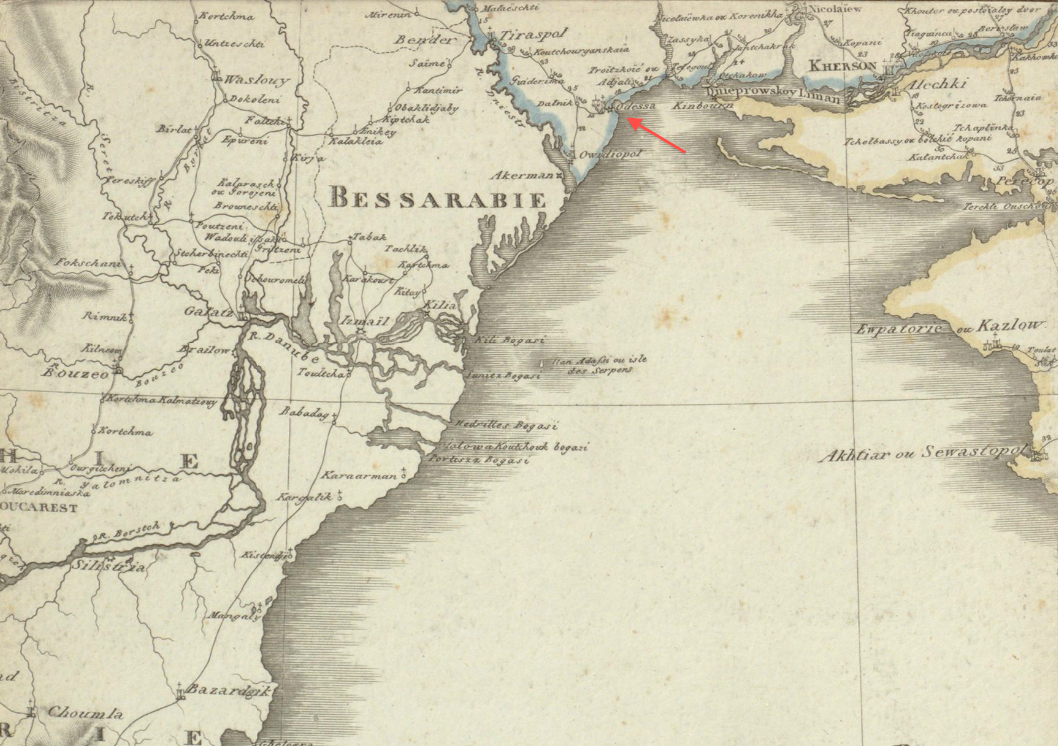
Map of Odesa region, 1809

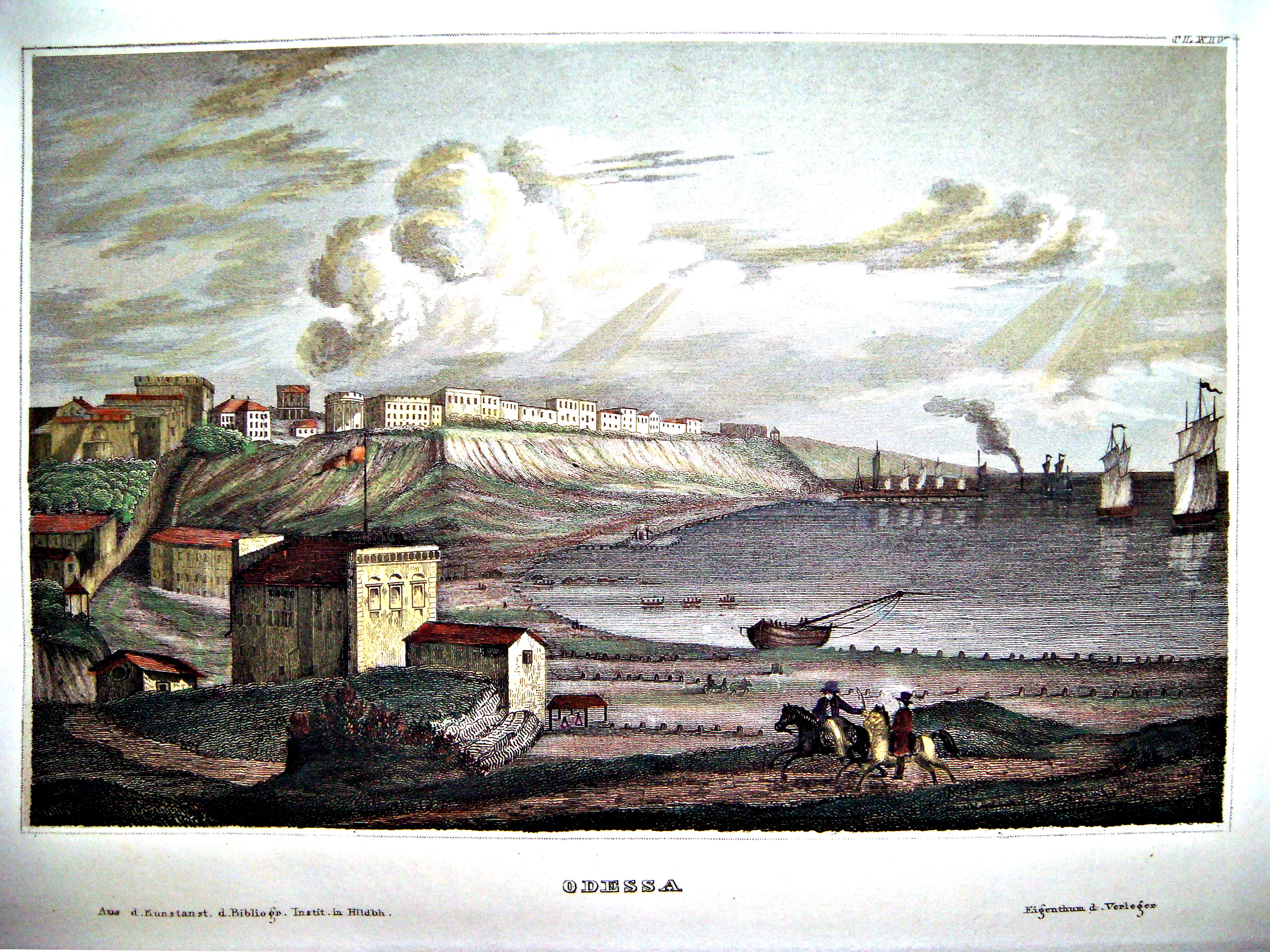
Odesa, 1830s

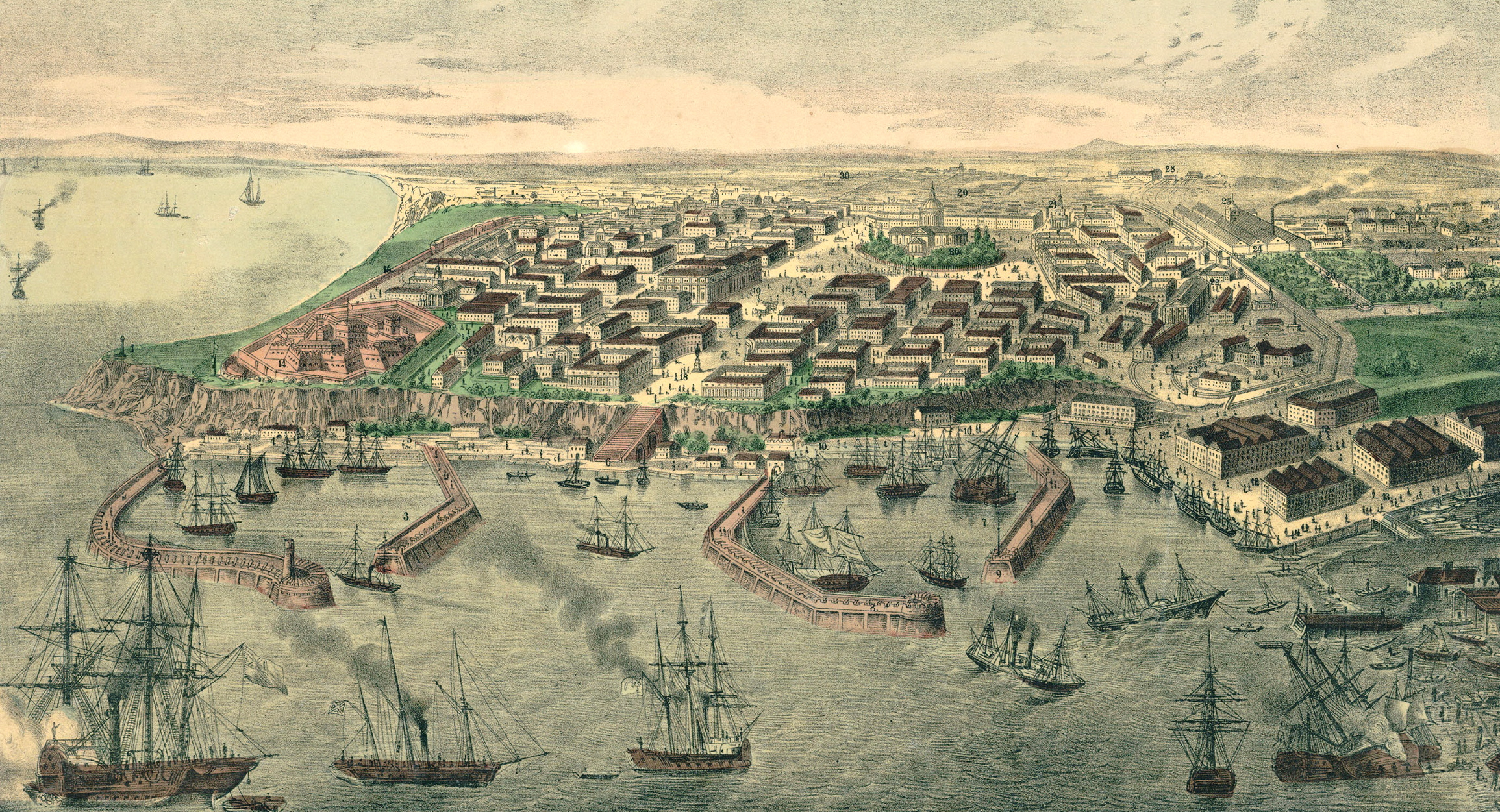
Odesa, 1850s

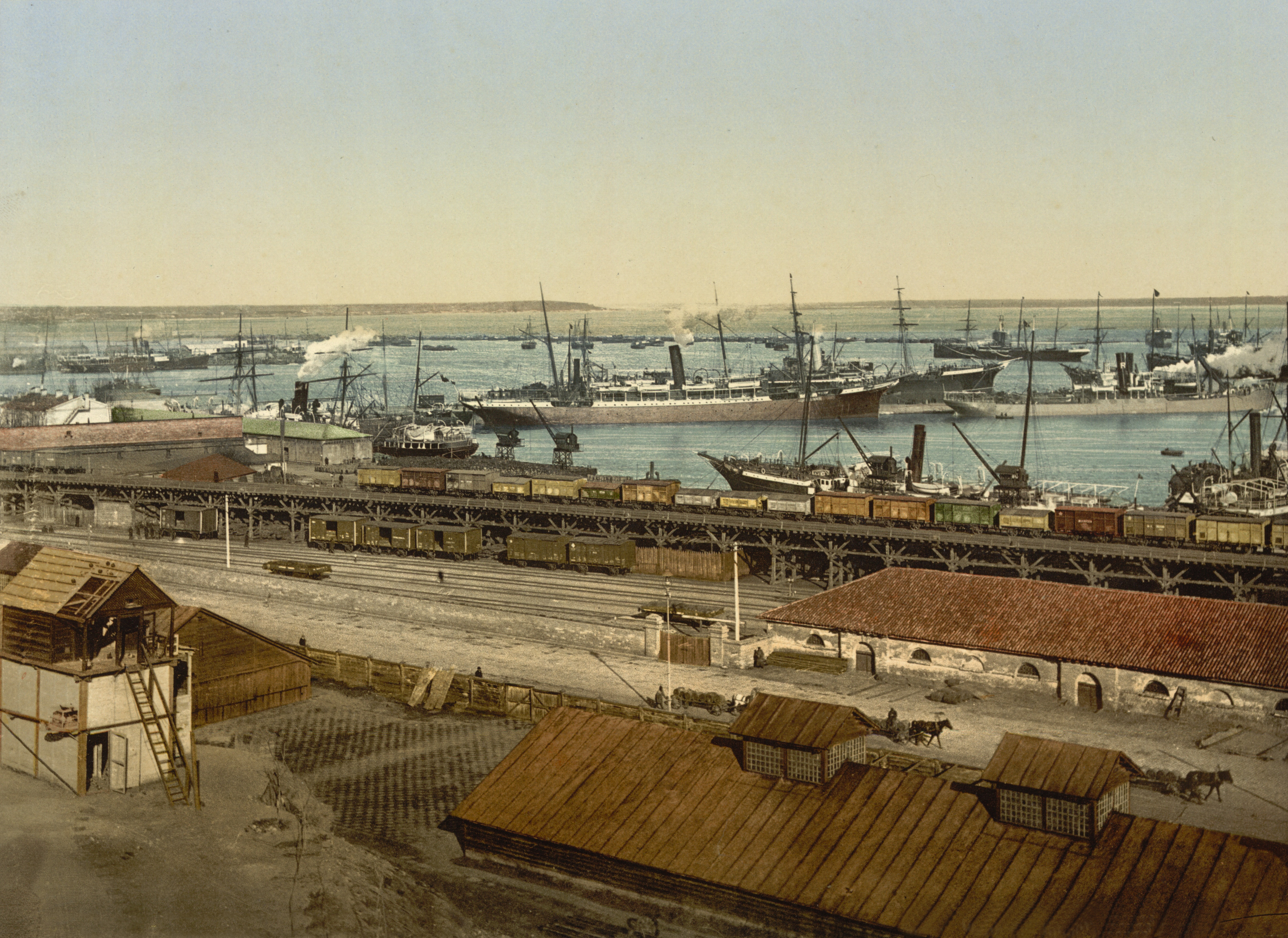
Port Practique, Odesa, c. 1890s

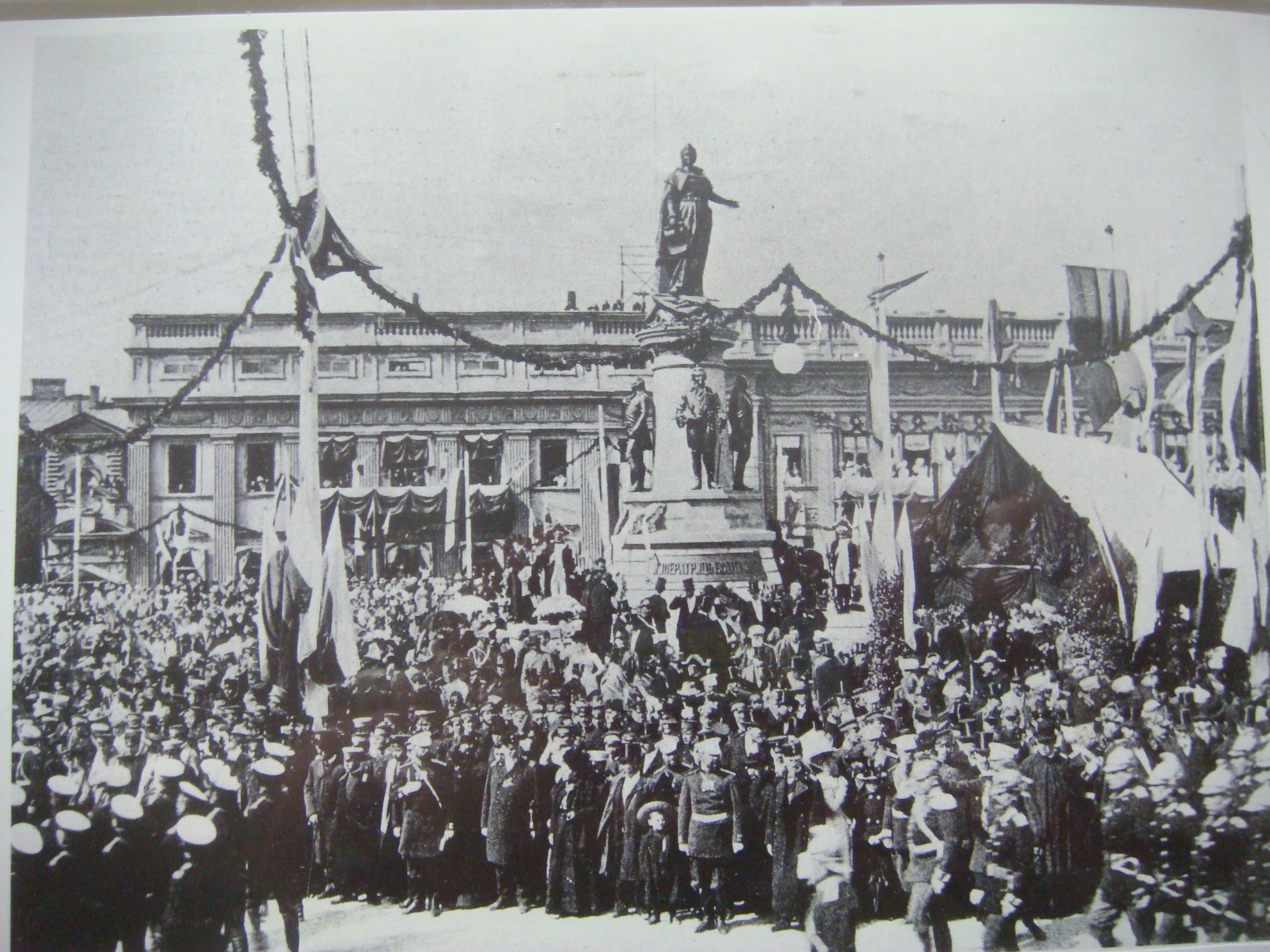
Unveiling of Catherine II monument, 1900

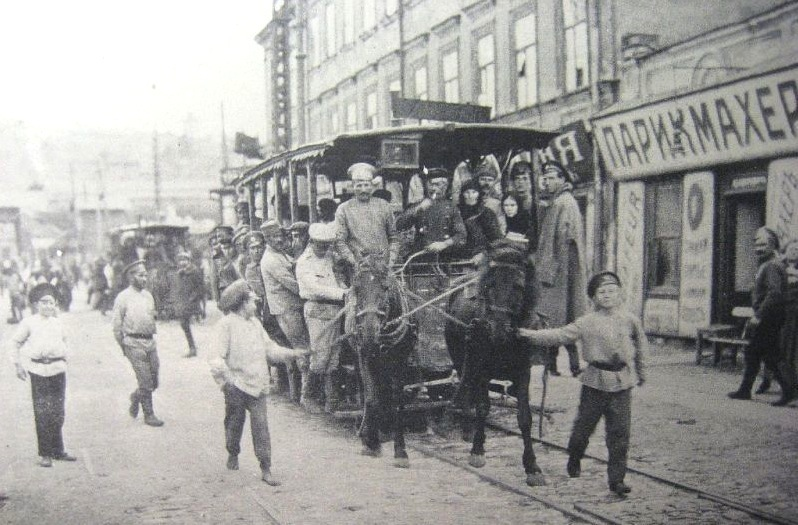
Odesa, 1917
