= Sasha Borovik =

American and European lawyer

- Саша Боровик

Personal details
- Born: 7 April 1968 (age 58) Lviv, Ukrainian SSR, Soviet Union

Alexander "Sasha" Borovik (Ukrainian: Олександр Боровик (Саша Боровик); born 7 April 1968) is an American lawyer from New York State who holds German citizenship. From 2015 to 2016, he served as First Deputy Minister of Economic Development and Trade of Ukraine. He also served as a deputy governor and advisor to the Governor of Odesa Oblast, Mikheil Saakashvili.

== Personal life ==
Born in Lviv on 7 April 1968, Borovik initially studied at Lviv University's Faculty of Foreign Languages. In spring 1990 he moved to Prague, Czechoslovakia. After studying at Prague University, he went on to graduate from Harvard Law School.

Borovik is a German citizen. He was granted Ukrainian citizenship in early March 2015 by president of Ukraine Petro Poroshenko. He was stripped of his Ukrainian citizenship on 4 May 2017 in an allegedly politically-motivated decision of president Poroshenko, of whom Borovik grew very critical.

== Career ==
In 1993, Borovik joined Squire, a law firm working with the Czech government and the EC on preparations for the enlargement of the European Union. In 2003, together with NYU Professor of neuro-science Andre Fenton, he co-founded Biosignal. He later worked as the head lawyer for Microsoft Worldwide Public Sector in Seattle. In March 2014, he moved to London and became Akamai Technologies' EMEA general counsel.

Following the Euromaidan revolution 2014 in Ukraine, Borovik was invited to work as the First Deputy Minister of Economy, but following the conflict with the prime minister Yatsenyuk, whom Borovik accused of lack of strategy, corruption and mismanagement of western funds, Borovik left the central government. In June 2015, the governor of Odesa Oblast, Mikheil Saakashvili, appointed him his deputy. After not receiving support from the central government, Borovik resigned from the post of Odesa Regional Administration deputy head on 4 May 2016.

In the October 2015 Odesa mayoral election Borovik was the Saakashvili's Team candidate for the mayor of Odesa. Incumbent mayor, Gennadiy Trukhanov defeated him with 52.9% against 25.7% in the first round of the mayoral election that Saakashvili's Team considered rigged.
