= Bremner =

Bremner is a surname of Scottish origin, and may refer to:

- Alison Bremner, American and Tlingit contemporary artist
- Anne Bremner (born 1958), American attorney and television personality
- Bill Bremner (1879–1961), New Zealand lawn bowler
- Billy Bremner (1942–1997), Scottish footballer (Leeds United, Scotland national team)
- Billy Bremner (Australian footballer), (1872–1957), Australian rules footballer
- Billy Bremner (musician), (born 1946), Scottish musician
- Chelsea Bremner (born 1995), New Zealand rugby union player
- Des Bremner (born 1952), Scottish footballer (Hibernian, Aston Villa, Scotland national team)
- Ewen Bremner (born 1972), Scottish film actor
- Gordon Bremner (1917–1988), Scottish footballer (Arsenal FC, Motherwell FC)
- Hutton Bremner (1912–1969), Scottish footballer
- Ian Bremner (born 1947), Australian rules footballer
- James Bremner (1784–1856), Scottish naval architect
- Janice Bremner (born 1974), Canadian synchronized swimmer
- Kyla Bremner (born 1977), Canadian-born Australian freestyle wrestler
- Marie Bremner (1904–1980), Australian soprano
- Robert Bremner or Brymer (c. 1713–1789), Scottish music publisher
- Robert G. Bremner (1874–1914), American newspaper publisher and Democrat politician
- Robert H. Bremner (1917–2002), professor of history at Ohio State University
- Rory Bremner (born 1961), Scottish comedian
- Tyler Bremner (born 2004), baseball player

== See also ==
- Bremner Boulevard, Toronto, Ontario, Canada (named for Raymond Bremner, Toronto Commissioner of Public Works 1963–1990)
- Bremner Point, Queensland, Australia
