= Military–civilian administration =

Military–civilian administration:

- Civil–military administrations (Ukraine), temporary local government units in Ukraine
- Military–civilian administrations, Russian-occupation military-led regimes in Ukraine, including:
  - Kherson military–civilian administration
  - Zaporizhzhia military–civilian administration
  - Kharkiv military–civilian administration
  - Mykolaiv military–civilian administration

== See also ==
- Civic-military dictatorship of Uruguay (1973–1985)
- Military administration (Nazi Germany), created by Germany during WW2 in occupied territories which were also known as Military administration authorities (German: Militärverwaltung)
