= 2014 Ukrainian election =

2014 Ukrainian election may refer to:

- 2014 Ukrainian presidential election
- 2014 Ukrainian parliamentary election
- 2014 Ukrainian local elections
