= 2014 Ukrainian local elections =

Municipal elections in Ukraine

← 2010	25 May 2014	2015 →
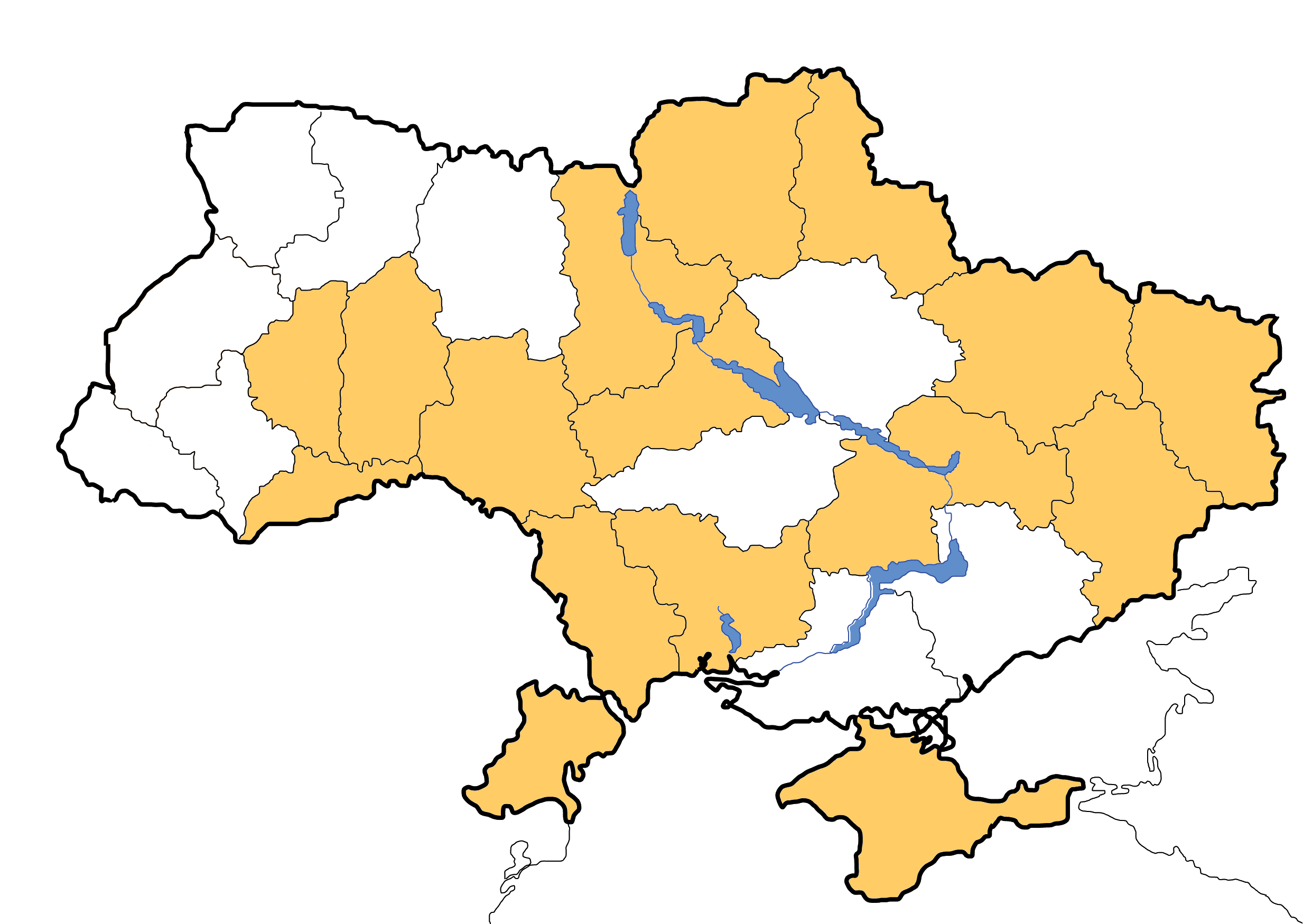
- Location of elections throughout Ukraine.

The 2014 Ukrainian local elections took place on 25 May 2014, four years after the conclusion of the last local elections, which took place in October 2010. The elections occurred during the political crisis in the aftermath of the 2014 Ukrainian revolution.

Although the Verkhovna Rada did not schedule early local elections for entire Ukraine, it announced early elections in a number of places throughout Ukraine, including mayoral elections for some large cities, such as Odesa and 2014 Kyiv local election.

Overall, mayoral elections occurred in 43 cities, 27 settlements, and 200 villages, in addition to 2 city council and 3 village council elections, throughout 14 of Ukraine's 24 oblasts, and were also scheduled to take place in the Autonomous Republic of Crimea. No Ukrainian mayoral or council elections took place in the Crimea, however, as, in March 2014 it was unilaterally annexed by Russia. (Note: The status of the Crimea and of the city of Sevastopol is currently under dispute between Russia and Ukraine; Ukraine and the majority of the international community consider the Crimea to be an autonomous republic of Ukraine and Sevastopol to be one of Ukraine's cities with special status, while Russia, on the other hand, considers the Crimea to be a federal subject of Russia and Sevastopol to be one of Russia's three federal cities.)

In June 2014, the Verkhovna Rada scheduled early mayoral elections for ten additional cities to be held on October 26, 2014.

== Changes in the law ==
On April 8, 2014, the Ukrainian parliament passed a new law regarding the local elections in the country. The new law allows local elections to be conducted concurrently with presidential elections. It also formalized the status of election observers, officially making them a part of the electoral process, and expanding their rights and authority. The new law also provides for the creation of territorial election commissions, provisions for removing local election officials before the end of their term, and changes to how the country's central election commission leadership is appointed.

On April 10, the parliament proposed to amend the local elections law to require a runoff vote for mayoral elections in cities with populations over 500,000, such as Kyiv and Odesa, but the proposal failed a vote in parliament.

== Election locations ==
The Verkhovna Rada, the parliament of Ukraine, scheduled the elections for Kyiv's mayor and city council for 25 May 2014, which were contested concurrently with the country's presidential election.

In late February, the parliament announced early mayoral elections for 27 cities throughout Ukraine:

- Chernivtsi, Chernivtsi Oblast
- Kherson, Kherson Oblast
- Mykolaiv, Mykolaiv Oblast
- Odesa, Odesa Oblast
- Okhtyrka, Sumy Oblast
- Nizhyn, Chernihiv Oblast
- Saky, Autonomous Republic of Crimea
- Fastiv, Kyiv Oblast
- Feodosia, Autonomous Republic of Crimea
- Netishyn, Khmelnytskyi Oblast
- Lysychansk, Luhansk Oblast
- Rovenky, Luhansk Oblast
- Kaniv, Cherkasy Oblast
- Pershotravensk, Dnipropetrovsk Oblast
- Snizhne, Donetsk Oblast
- Khrystynivka, Cherkasy Oblast
- Verkhnodniprovsk, Dnipropetrovsk Oblast
- Bilopillia, Sumy Oblast
- Barvinkove, Kharkiv Oblast
- Kamianka, Cherkasy Oblast
- Zbarazh, Ternopil Oblast
- Kremenets, Ternopil Oblast
- Zboriv, Ternopil Oblast
- Rodynske, Donetsk Oblast
- Perevalsk, Luhansk Oblast
- Zhmerynka, Vinnytsia Oblast

On March 15, the Verkhovna Rada announced early elections for 228 localities throughout the country for 25 May 2014. In addition, the parliament also announced early elections for five mayors throughout the country:

- Pereiaslav-Khmelnytskyi, Kyiv Oblast
- Rozhysche, Volyn Oblast
- Piatykhatky, Dnipropetrovsk Oblast
- Monastyryska, Ternopil Oblast
- Khotyn, Chernivtsi Oblast

On March 17, the parliament announced early elections for the Cherkasy City Council.

On March 25, the deadline for announcing early elections according to Ukraine's electoral law, the Verkhovna Rada announced mayoral elections for 10 additional cities throughout the country:

- Sumy
- Vasylkiv, Kyiv Oblast
- Pryluky, Chernihiv Oblast
- Antratsyt, Luhansk Oblast
- Zhovti Vody, Dnipropetrovsk Oblast
- Romny, Sumy Oblast
- Ladyzhyn, Vinnytsia Oblast
- Bobrynets, Kirovohrad Oblast
- Baturyn, Chernihiv Oblast
- Korsun-Shevchenkivskyi, Cherkasy Oblast

== Results ==
Vitali Klitschko won the mayoral election in Kyiv with almost 57% of the votes, while his party the Ukrainian Democratic Alliance for Reform won 73 of the 120 seats in the Kyiv City Council.

In Odesa Gennadiy Trukhanov defeated Eduard Gurvits with 43.39% against 32,02% in the mayoral election.

In Mykolaiv Acting Mayor Yuriy Hranaturov kept this post with 28,29%. Hranaturov was an independent candidate, but former Party of Regions member until a few months for the election.

In Kherson Acting Mayor and Batkivshchyna member Volodymyr Mykolayenko won the mayoral elections in with 35.93%.

In Sumy (also) Acting Mayor and (also) Batkivshchyna member Oleksandr Lysenko won the mayoral elections in with 41,07%.

The Central Election Commission of Ukraine ordered a re-count in Cherkasy by a new local Election Commission on 4 June 2014 because of "systematic and gross violations of the law".

Communist Party of Ukraine candidate Valentin Demyanchuk won the mayoral election in Piatykhatky, Dnipropetrovsk Oblast with 27% of the vote.
