= Oleksiy Kostusyev =

Ukrainian politician (born 1954)

- Олексій Костусєв
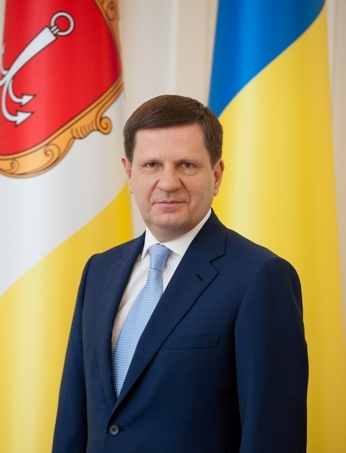
- Kostusyev in 2012

Mayor of Odessa
- In office 6 November 2010 – 4 November 2013
- Preceded by: Eduard Hurvits
- Succeeded by: Oleh Bryndak (acting)

People's Deputy of Ukraine
- In office 12 May 1998 – 21 May 2010

Personal details
- Born: 29 June 1954 (age 72) Nevelsk, Russian SFSR, Soviet Union (now Sakhalin Oblast, Russia)
- Children: Oleksiy Goncharenko

Oleksiy Oleksiiovych Kostusyev (Ukrainian: Олексій Олексійович Костусєв; 29 June 1954) is a Ukrainian politician and former mayor of Odesa from 2010 to 2013. Kostusyev is the father of fellow Ukrainian politician Oleksiy Honcharenko. Kostusyev divorced Oleksiy's mother when Oleksiy was three years old.

Kostusyev previously served as the head of the Anti-Monopoly Committee of Ukraine, the nation's premier competition regulator.

== Early life and education ==
Oleksiy Oleksiiovych Kostusyev was born on 29 June 1954 to Oleksiy Oleksiyovych (1928–1983), a captain 1st rank and sailor-border guard, and Violla Alekseevna (born 1932), a doctor.

In 1971–1975, Kostusyev studied at the Odesa National Economics University majoring in economics. From August 1975 to January 1991, Kostusyev studied and worked at the Odesa National Maritime University, including as a postgraduate student, assistant, senior teacher, associate professor, and head of the department of social flight. In 2004, he defended his doctoral dissertation on "Methodological principles of forming an effective competitive environment in the economy of Ukraine" (Методологічні засади формування ефективного конкурентного середовища в економіці України).

From 1976 to 1977, Kostusyev also served in the Soviet Armed Forces.

== Political career ==
From 1990 to 1994, Kostusyev was a member of the Odesa City Council, where he was chairman of the Odesa city privatization committee. During this time, he successfully petitioned the council to grant official status to the Russian language, which eventually passed and made it co-equal with Ukrainian in city affairs. From January 1991 to January 1993, Kostusyev also served as deputy chairman for economic affairs in the executive committee of the Kyivskyi District of Odesa.

During the 1994 Ukrainian parliamentary election, Kostusyev ran for the Verkhovna Rada in the Odesa Oblast constituency No. 294, but failed after winning second place in the second round.

=== Deputy in Verkhovna Rada ===
From March 1998 to December 2001, Kostusyev was No.20 on the electoral list of the 3rd Ukrainian Verkhovna Rada for the Socialist Party – Peasant Party. At the time of the 1998 Ukrainian parliamentary election, he was the President of the Charitable Foundation. B. Derevyanka, which is based in Odesa. During his time in office, Kostusyev changed his party registration: from May 1998 to December 1999, he was a member of the Socialist Party, and then afterwards a member of Labour Ukraine. During his post from July 1998 to February 2000, Kostusyev was the Chairman of the Subcommittee on Energy and Energy Saving, within the Committee on Fuel and Energy Complex, Nuclear Policy and Nuclear Safety. Then afterwards from February 2000 to December 2001, he was the Chairman of the Committee on Economic Policy, National Economic Management, Property, and Investments. On 14 December 2001, Kostusyev resigned from his post.

In June 2001, Kostusyev was appointed as Chairman of the Antimonopoly Committee of Ukraine (AMCU), which he headed for seven years. During this time, the committee established a system of repayment for unpaid heat and water bills, recovering more than 3 billion hryvnias. In 2003, the committee ordered Odesa's city executive committee to revise water supply tariffs, resolving the issue of double payment for water losses in in-house networks. The committee also fined two companies with 100 million hryvnias for inflating gasoline prices, five companies with 17 million for inflating sugar prices, and lowered money transfer fees for Western Union for 10 countries with large Ukrainian populations. In April 2010, the Verkhovna Rada re-appointed Kostusyev as committee chairman.

From 2004 to 2005, he was the chairman of the Soyuz party. Then in 2006, Viktor Yanukovych, the leader of the Party of Regions, encouraged Kostusyev and other members of the Soyuz party to join the party and concentrate politicians opposed to the Orange Revolution.

From April to October 2006, Kostusyev was No. 29 on the electoral list of the 5th Ukrainian Verkhovna Rada for the Party of Regions. At the time of the 2006 Ukrainian parliamentary election, he was the Chairman of the Anti-Monopoly Committee. During his 4-month tenure as lawmaker, Kostusyev was a member of the Committee on Budget (July–October 2006). On 5 October 2006, he resigned from his post.

=== Mayor of Odesa ===
During the 2010 Ukrainian local elections, Kostusyev ran for mayor of Odesa as a candidate for the Party of Regions. On 31 October 2010, he was elected as mayor of Odesa after beating incumbent Eduard Hurvits by more than 20%.

After Kostusyev became mayor, the local government ended a contract with the company "Remondis Ukraine", which previously worked on removing household waste from city streets.

In February 2011, the Odesa City Council adopted a resolution to award a salary bonus of 8,000 hryvnias for Kostusyev, which is a 105% raise and is 3,000 hryvnias more than what his predecessor Eduard Hurvits received. Kostusyev justified this raise because of he is a first-rank civil servant, his years of service, doctorate, and having the title of Honored Economist of Ukraine.

On 9 March 2011, during the 179th anniversary of Taras Shevchenko's birth, Kostusyev was asked to recite some of Shevchenko's works, but the mayor refused.

In March 2011, the Odesa City Council adopted a resolution requiring the use of a Victory Banner replica on 10 April (Liberation of Odesa) and 9 May (Victory Day). Then in April, a series of bizaare congratulatory posters commissioned by the city council appeared on the city streets, featuring a photograph of Romanian soldiers standing on the parapet of Prymorskyi Boulevard. These posters were soon removed before 10 April, and received coverage from Russia's Channel One. In response to critics, Kostusyev stated that "There's no need to look for problems where there aren't any", and added that the USSR fought against both Nazi Germany and Romania, and that Odessa was abandonned by Soviet troops, so the poster depicted historical events that needed to be remembered.

In 2012, Kostusyev developed a 10-year plan for the city involving several programs, and the Odesa City Council has a commission composed of deputies and members of the public that monitors its implementation. Overall, the plan has five main goals:

- Be comfortable to live in.
- Be a clean and green city.
- Be a unique city with rich history and culture.
- Be a city convenient for business and attractive for investors.
- Be a city where residents trust city authorities.

The plan includes developing a comprehensive network of schools and preschools in a program called "Happy Childhood". In September 2012, the first kindergarten in 20 years opened, which was the first of five total planned to be opened that year. The plan also includes an improvement of potable water without additional treatment called "Clean Water". Additionally, the plan seeks to organize competitions and festivals aimed at popularizing the Russian language and preserving Odesa's traditional cultural environment. Projects include improving Russian-language teaching materials for schools, making 6 June, the birthday of Alexander Pushkin, a city holiday, and erecting several sculptures in the city. The figures honored in the statues include Fyodor Radetsky, Isaac Babel, and Vladimir Vysotsky (near the Odesa Film Studio). There is also an existing statue of Alexander Suvorov, which underwent restoration and reopened.

==== Language policy ====
In December 2010, during an opening session of the Odesa City Council, Kostusyev as mayor requested a resolution to conduct communication in Russian, which was unanimously adopted. This effectively allowed Russian to become a co-official language within the city administration. Hanna Herman, advisor to president Viktor Yanukovych, criticized Kostusyev for conducting the records of the Odesa City Council in Russian.

In 2010, Kostusyev alongside Dmytro Tabachnyk, Volodymyr Semynozhenko, Irina Berezhna, and Vadym Kolesnichenko, opposed mandatory Ukrainian dubbing in films.

On 8 June 2011, Kostusyev participated in an interview with Echo of Moscow, where he stressed that "any citizen of Ukraine, at least a young one, should know the Ukrainian language". However, Kostusyev also defended his decision to increase bilingual schools in Odesa since it gives more choice for parents, raising controversy over his views on the status of the Russian language in Ukraine.

==== Resignation ====
On 31 October 2013, Kostusyev resigned from his post as mayor. The resignation was accepted during a city council session on 4 November, and he left the country soon afterwards. Some analysts explained that leaders of Ukraine and Party of Regions had several disagreements with Kostusyev due to his relative pro-Russian position.

In February 2014, following the Revolution of Dignity, Kostusyev commented on his resignation, explaining that "I resigned when they tried to force me through threats and pressure to commit vile acts, including destroying Ihor Markov's business. I couldn't take a living from the family of a man I was friends with, and I resigned as mayor".

=== Corruption investigation ===
On 11 October 2023, the National Anti-Corruption Bureau of Ukraine placed Kostusyev on a wanted list regarding the seizure of property at the Odesa International Airport. According to the investigation, two well-known Odesa businessmen organized a scheme in 2011 to seize property at the airport. They did this by registering an LLC to establish a joint venture with the Odesa City Council, distributing 75% and 25% respectively. The goal was to acquire ownership of the airport worth 118 million hryvnias with Kostusyev as mayor securing consent from the city council for the investment plans. In addition, the prosecution also accused Kostusyev of committing forgery when he gave the controlled company the right to form a joint venture with the city council without competition.

On 11 December 2023, the High Anti-Corruption Court of Ukraine sentenced Kostusyev in absentia to imprisonment in a pre-trial detention center on account of the airport case. All members of the criminal group are accused of large-scale misappropriation of property under Part 5 of Article 191 of the Criminal Code of Ukraine. In addition, two businessmen are also suspected of creating a criminal group under Part 3 of Article 27 of the Criminal Code of Ukraine, and Kostusyev accused of official forgery under Part 2 of Article 366 of the Criminal Code of Ukraine.

== Other endeavors ==
Since 1993, Kostusyev has been the head of the Assoc. privatization bodies of Ukraine. He was also the founder and leader of the Odesa Civil Forum. In 1998, Kostusyev became the president of the charity Boris Derevyanko Foundation, which hosts a yearly drawing competition for children called the "Colours of Odesa".

Since December 2000, he has been a member of a national council for coordinating multi-level governance across national, regional, and local governing bodies. Kostusyev also participated in a national council for adapting Ukrainian legislation to EU legislation since August 2000. Since 2003, Kostusyev has been a member of an inter-departmental commission on information policy and information security.

In 2004, Kostusyev was elected chairman of the Interstate Council on Antitrust Policy of the Commonwealth of Independent States, becoming the first Ukrainian in this position.

== Honorary awards ==
- Civil servant of the 1st rank (September 2001)
- Honored Economist of Ukraine (November 2002)
- Order of Merit III (January 2001)
- Order of Merit ІІ (May 2004)
- Honorary Diploma of the Cabinet of Ministers of Ukraine (June 2004)
- Order of the Holy Apostolic Grand Duke Vladimir III (April 2001)
- Order of the Holy Apostolic Grand Duke Vladimir II (June 2006)

== Personal life ==
Kostusyev is married to Irina Vasylivna (born 1965), an engineer. They have two children: Oleksiy Goncharenko (born 1980), a lawmaker in the Verkhovna Rada in the VIII and IX convocations, and Viola (born 1988).

In 2005, with the blessing of His Holiness Patriarch Alexy II and Metropolitan Vladimir of Kiev and All Ukraine, A. Kostusev brought to Ukraine a portion of the relics of one of the most revered Orthodox saints, Seraphim of Sarov. The relic traveled to several cities, including Kharkiv, Donetsk, Dnipro, Simferopol, and Odesa, with more than 1.5 million pilgrims having venerated the relics. The relics were subsequently transferred to the Kyiv Pechersk Lavra.

In 2010, Kostusev declared an income of more than ₴1.7 million, of which one million was listed as "material assistance". The mayor later stated that he had entered in the column "material assistance" — an inheritance from a deceased friend. Subsequently, on 31 January 2011, Kostusev initiated a meeting of the Odesa City Council session where they decided that Stepan Bandera and Roman Shukhevych were not heroes of Ukraine.

Political offices
Preceded by Oleksandr Zavada	Director of Anti-Monopoly Committee; 2001–2008	Succeeded by Oleksandr Melnychenko (acting)
Preceded by Oleksandr Melnychenko (acting)	Director of Anti-Monopoly Committee; 2010	Succeeded by Vasyl Tsushko
Preceded by Eduard Gurwits	Mayor of Odesa; 2010–2013	Succeeded by Oleh Bryndak (acting)
