= Antimonopoly Committee of Ukraine =

Competition regulator of Ukraine

- Антимонопольний комітет
- Anti-Monopoly Committee emblem

- Anti-Monopoly Committee flag

Agency overview
- Formed: November 26, 1993
- Jurisdiction: Ukraine government
- Headquarters: 45, metrop. Vasyl Lypkivskyi street, Kyiv, Ukraine, 03035
- Annual budget: UAH 66.0 million
- Agency executive: Pavlo Kyrylenko, Chairman of Committee
- Parent agency: President of Ukraine
- Child agency: Commission for promoting court settlement of disputes between investors and executive authorities
- Website: Official website

The Antimonopoly Committee of Ukraine (AMK) (Ukrainian: Антимонопольний комітет України, romanized: Antymonopolnyi komitet Ukrainy) is the supreme competition regulator in Ukraine. It is a state authority with special status, aimed at providing the state protection to competition in the field of entrepreneurial activity.

== Overview ==
The Antimonopoly Committee of Ukraine carries out its activities on the grounds of the legislative acts concerning economic competition protection, such as the Laws of Ukraine “On economic competition protection”, “On the Antimonopoly Committee of Ukraine”, and “On protection from unfair competition”.

The committee consists of the chairman and 10 commissioners, out of which there are two first deputies and three other deputies. The activities of the Antimonopoly Committee of Ukraine are under the control of the president of Ukraine; The committee is accountable to the Supreme Council of Ukraine. The president in consent with the Supreme Council of Ukraine designates and dismisses from the appointment the chairman of the Antimonopoly Committee of Ukraine. First deputies and deputies of the chairman of the Antimonopoly Committee of Ukraine are to be designated and dismissed from their appointments by the president of Ukraine on the proposal of the prime minister. The proposal is made on the grounds of the suggestions of the chairman of the Antimonopoly Committee of Ukraine.

In every region of Ukraine, including the cities of Kyiv and Sevastopol, territorial offices of the Antimonopoly Committee of Ukraine are to be created. The above-mentioned offices are legal entities which carry out the tasks of the Antimonopoly Committee on the regional level.

Within the framework of its procuration the committee supervises the activities of enterprises of all types of ownership, state and local authorities, activities of foreign entrepreneurs in Ukraine as well. The committee is entitled to make decisions concerning abatement of the competition legislation breach, which are obligatory for enterprises and state authorities, to allow or prohibit concerted actions in the market, to impose fines or apply other sanctions with respect to the breakers of the rules of fair competition. In 2020, the Anti-Monopoly Committee demanded that its powers be expanded to give the agency the ability to have a say in the appeal of public procurement.

== Composition ==
=== Market Studies Department ===
- Division for Infrastructure, Housing, and Utilities
  - Office of Transportation Markets
  - Office of Communication, Housing, and Utilities Markets
- Division for Energy Markets
  - Office of Oil Products Market
  - Office of Gas and Energy
- Division for Financial and Non-Production Markets
  - Office of Financial Markets
  - Office of Non-Production Markets
  - Office of Medical Services and Retail Markets
- Division for Industrial Markets
  - Office of Agro-Industrial Markets
  - Office of Industrial Markets

=== Investigations Department ===
  - Office of Investigations of Monopoly Abuse and Restrictive Practices
  - Office of Investigations of horizontally coordinated actions
  - Office of Investigation of Unfair Competition
  - Office of Investigations of certain types of anti-competitive coordinated actions

=== Department of Operations and Support ===
- Division of Human Resources and coordination of territorial offices
- Division of Strategic Analysis, Planning, and Methodology
- Division of the Committee Affairs
- Division of Procurement, Administration, and IT Support
- Division of Control over Concentration and Coordinated Actions
- Division on issues of Decision Appeals in Government Procurement
- Office of Accounting and Financial Planning
- Office of International Cooperation
- Office of public relations and interaction with mass media and access to public information
- Safety sector
- Control-Revision Sector
- Sector of control over the executions of orders of higher authorities
- Regional offices

== Chairmen ==
- 1992 - 2001—Oleksandr Zavada
- 2001 - 2008—Oleksiy Kostusyev
- 2008 - 2010—Oleksandr Melnychenko (acting)
- 2010 - 2010—Oleksiy Kostusyev
- 2010–2014—Vasyl Tsushko
- 2014 - 2015—Mykola Barash (acting)
- 2015–2020—Yuriy Terentyev
- 2020 – 2023—Olha Pishchanska
- 2023 – present—Pavlo Kyrylenko
