= Boris Pelikan =

Ukrainian politician (1861–1931)

Boris Aleksandrovich Pelikan (Russian: Борис Александрович Пеликан; 1861–1931) was the Mayor of Odesa in the Russian Empire from 1913 to 1917.

== Biography ==
Pelikan was born sometime in 1861. He first became active in politics in 1905 as part of the monarchist movement during the Russian Revolution of 1905, and afterwards quickly rose to leadership roles in Odesa. In early 1906, he became the Chairman of the Odesa branch of the Russian Assembly, and on 4 February 1905 was a co-founder of the local branch for the Union of the Russian People (SRN), serving as its deputy chairman. He was a participant in the congresses for the Union of the Russian People, where he advocated for creating a unified nationalist organization and was elected to commissions on monarchist unification. In 1908, he accused A.I. Konovnitsyn, who was one of the other co-founders of the Union of the Russian People, of embezzlement to which an official audit found no violations. As a result, he was expelled from the SRN for slander, and so he briefly stepped back from politics.

Thereafter, he served as a co-founder of the charitable society "Brotherly Aid", which aimed to support monarchists and the poor. In 1912, he attempted to return to power by meeting with Russian Interior Minister Alexander Alexandrovich Makarov to propose a plan for the government to control elections by strengthening right-wing partials, taking control of zemstvo, and appealing to the Orthodox Jews against what he called "liberal Jewish intelligentsia". However, his proposals were not adopted by the ministry. On 19 May 1913, after strong support from Pelikan's supporters, he was elected as Mayor of Odesa in the only case in which a monarchist had become head of a majority city in the Russian Empire. During the election, the liberals attempted to overturn these results, however the Odesa Judicial Chamber and the Senate found no violations (in June 1917, a Senate case was reopened following the revolutions). He was eventually elected to the Council of Monarchist Congresses, and upon the outbreak of World War I, as mayor, helped form the First Serbian Volunteer Division for which he was awarded the Order of St. Sava.

Following the 1917 Russian Revolution, he was investigated by the provisional government's extraordinary commission on charges of electoral fraud from 1913, and he was arrested and imprisoned in Odesa. He was freed after the October Revolution, when the Bolsheviks seized power, and he fled Russia to Serbia. In exile, he began a figure in the monarchist émigré movement, where he supported legitimist positions including supporting some romanov claimants. He died in March 1931 in Belgrade.
