= Odesa City Council =

City council in Ukraine

Odesa City Council Одеська міська рада

Type
- Type: Unicameral

Leadership
- Chairman (Mayor): Gennadiy Trukhanov, Trust the Deeds since 27 May, 2014
- Secretary: Igor Koval since 2 December, 2020

Structure
- Seats: 64
- Political groups: Trust the Deeds (19); Servant of the People (8); European Solidarity (10); Independent (18); Vacant (9)
- Length of term: 5 years

Elections
- Last election: 25 October 2020
- Next election: 2025 (May be postponed due to martial law in Ukraine)

Meeting place
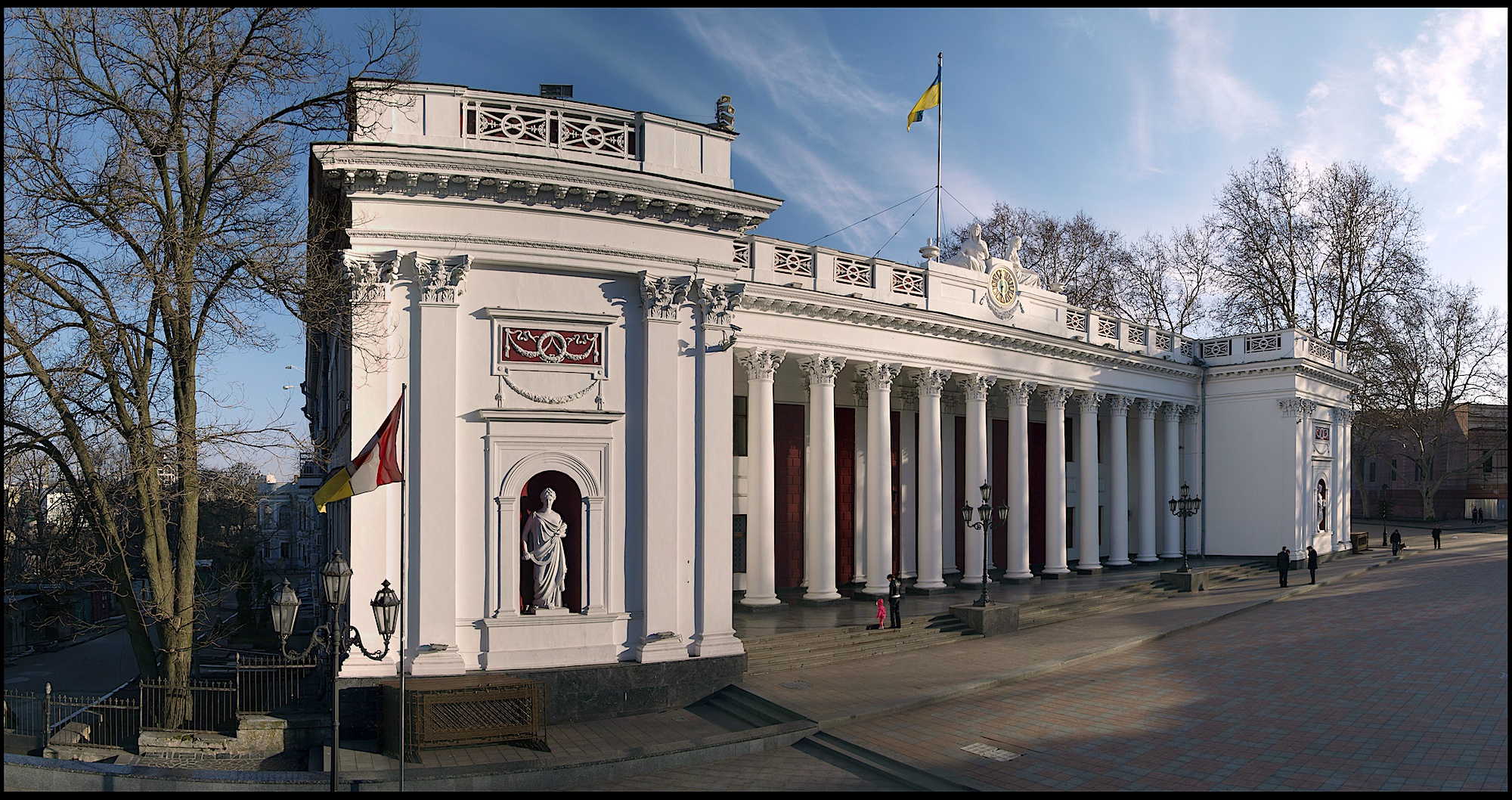
- 1 Birzhova Square, Odesa, Ukraine; 46°29′08″N 30°44′38″E

Website
- omr.gov.ua

Odesa City Council (Ukrainian: Одеська міська рада) is the municipal council governing the Ukrainian city of Odesa. The council has 64 representatives and is elected every 5 years.

== History ==
=== 2015 elections ===
During the 2015 Ukrainian local elections on 25 October, 2015, the results for the city council were as follows:

- Trust the Deeds: 27 seats
- European Solidarity: 12 seats
- Opposition Bloc: 12 seats
- Serhii Kivalov Bloc: 6 seats
- Self Reliance: 5 seats
- Independents: 2 seats

=== 2020 elections ===
During the 2020 Ukrainian local elections on 25 October, 2020, the results for the city council were as follows:

- Trust the Deeds: 20 seats
- Opposition Platform — For Life: 18 seats
- Servant of the People: 10 seats
- European Solidarity: 10 seats
- Party of Shariy: 6 seats
