= Gennadiy Trukhanov =

Ukrainian politician (born 1965)

- Геннадій Труханов
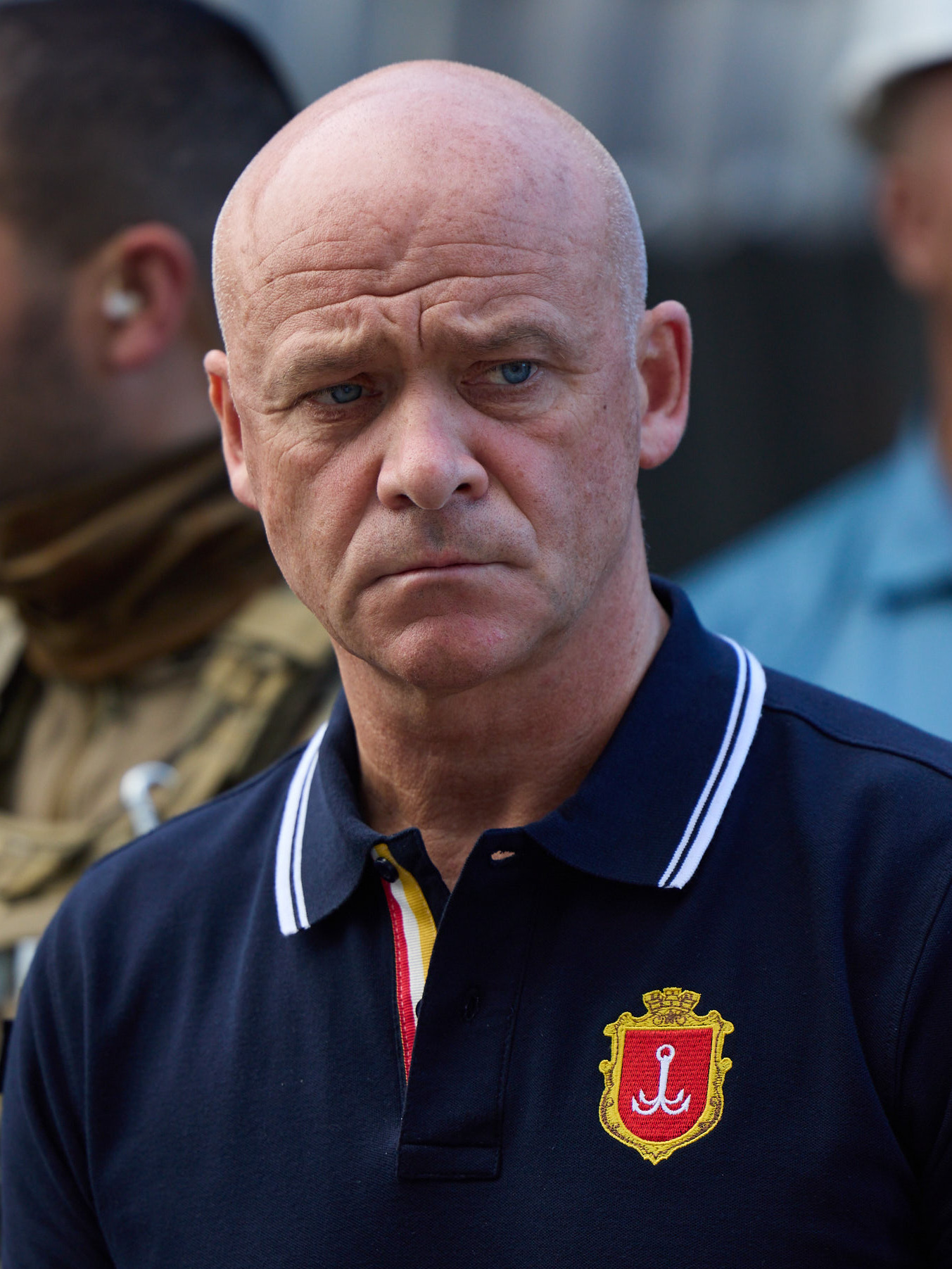
- Trukhanov in 2022

Mayor of Odesa
- In office 27 May 2014 – 14 October 2025
- Preceded by: Oleg Bryndak (Acting)
- Succeeded by: Serhiy Lysak (as head of the Odesa city military administration)

Personal details
- Born: 17 January 1965 (age 61) Odesa, Ukrainian SSR, Soviet Union
- Party: Trust the Deeds

Gennadiy Leonidovich Trukhanov (Note: As transliterated from Russian: Геннадий Леонидович Труханов. Also known as Hennadii Leonidovych Trukhanov, Ukrainian: Геннадій Леонідович Труханов.) (born 17 January 1965) is a Ukrainian former politician. He was the mayor of Odesa from 2014 until 2025, when President of Ukraine Volodymyr Zelenskyy revoked his Ukrainian citizenship.

== Early life and education ==
Gennadiy Trukhanov was born on 17 January 1965 in Odesa, which was then in the Ukrainian Soviet Socialist Republic, a part of the Soviet Union. In 1986, he graduated from the Frunze Artillery School in Odesa. After graduation, he was given the rank of lieutenant. He was an engineer who repaired and maintained automobile equipment.

From 1986 until 1992, he served in the North Caucasus Military District. He retired from Soviet Armed Forces in 1992 with the rank of captain. From 1992 to 1993, Trukhanov served as the head of the security service at the small research and production enterprise "Minimax". He then became director of the security company Kapitan & Co., a position he held till 1996.

In 2001, he took on the role of advisor to the General Director for Security of the Enterprise with Foreign Investments LLC "Lukoil-Ukraine", where he worked until 2002. The following year, he served as the assistant to the Security Representative of the President of Lukoil JSC in Ukraine. From 2004 to 2007, Trukhanov was an advisor and assistant consultant in the Verkhovna Rada (Ukrainian parliament). His career continued with a position as advisor to the Director for Relations with Government Authorities and the Public at the private enterprise "Ukrtranscontainer" from 2007 to 2008. He then served as the Chief Specialist of the Regional Relations Division of the Department of Veterans Affairs of the State Committee of Ukraine for Veterans Affairs from 2008 to 2011. From March to November 2012, he was the Deputy General Director for Customer Relations at Brooklyn-Kyiv LLC.

From 2002 to 2006 he studied at the Kyiv National University of Internal Affairs, where he qualified as a lawyer, and in 2008, he defended his PhD thesis at Odesa I. I. Mechnykov National University. In 2013, he graduated from the Odesa Regional Institute of Public Administration of the National Academy of Public Administration under the President of Ukraine.

== Political career ==
In 2005, Gennadiy Trukhanov became a deputy of the Odesa City Council. From 2006 to 2010, he also held the position of Chairman of the Permanent Deputy Commission of the Odesa City Council on Youth and Sports issues. In 2010, he became the head of the deputy majority in the Odesa City Council.

On 12 December 2012, he was elected to the Ukrainian parliament as a representative of the Party of Regions.

=== Mayor of Odesa ===
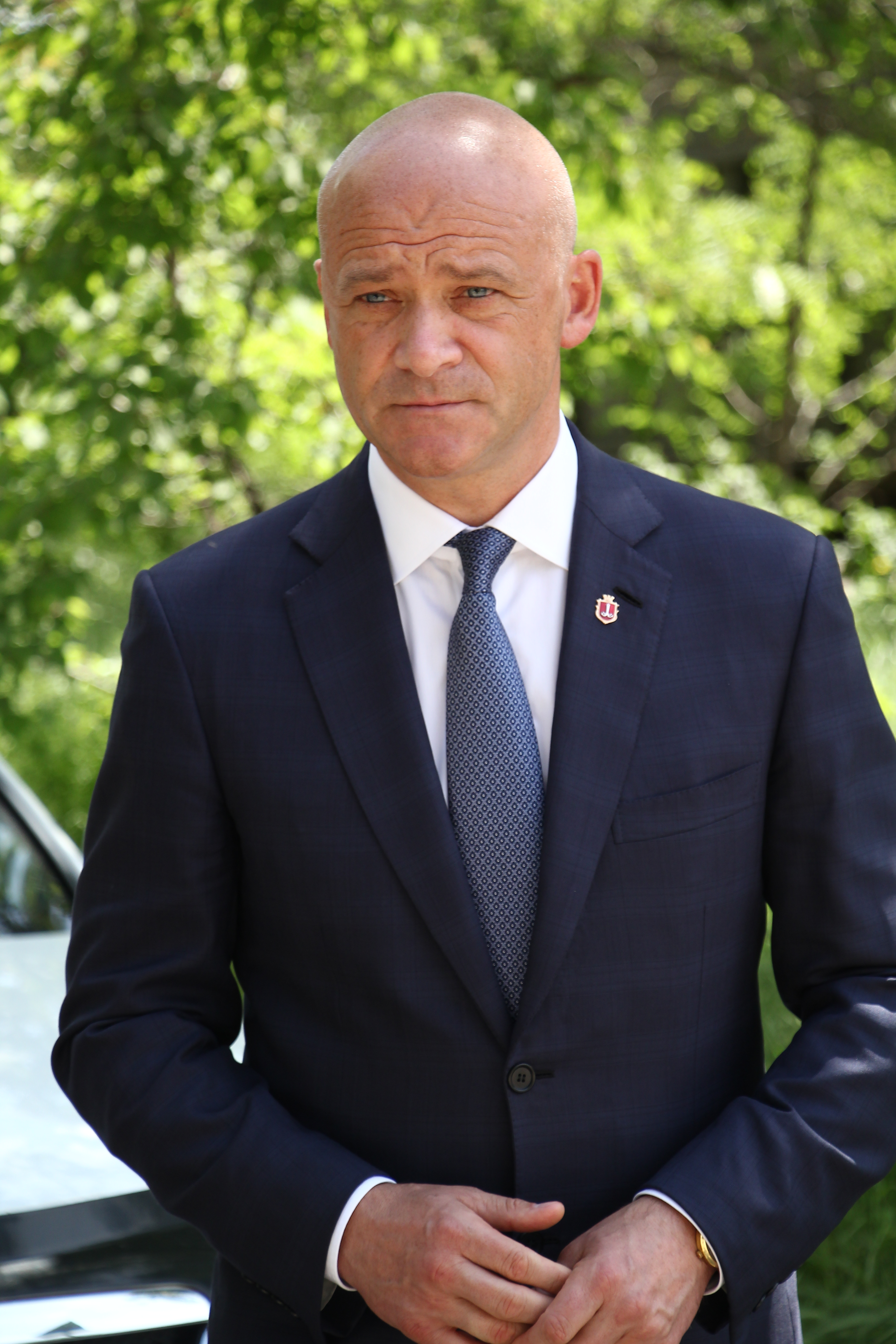
Trukhanov in 2015

Trukhanov was elected as the mayor of Odesa three times, securing the position in 2014, 2015, and 2020. Amid rising unrest in Ukraine in the aftermath of the 2014 Ukrainian revolution and the violent 2014 Odesa clashes, he was elected mayor of the city on 25 May 2014. In the 2015 mayoral election of Odesa Trukhanov was reelected in the first round with 52.9% of the vote.

In 2018, Trukhanov opened the Center for Integrated Social Services, where city residents can receive social services, certificates, or consultations.

Trukhanov led the Ukrainian Muay Thai Boxing Federation. In 2018, he initiated the creation of the High School Students' Parliament, representing the interests of students and implementing charitable, environmental, national-patriotic, intellectual, and creative projects. That same year, he helped implement the Odesa School Basketball League project, involving 80 teams from 50 schools.

Trukhanov supported the restoration of several architectural monuments, including the Potemkin Stairs, the Russov House, the Falz-Fein House, the Skarzhynsky income house and others. Existing and new parks were also modernised and built, including the Istanbul Park—a joint project of Trukhanov and Istanbul Mayor Kadir Topbas—and the Greek Park, supported by the Greek diaspora.

For the July 2019 Ukrainian parliamentary election, Trukhanov was given a top-ten spot in the party list of Opposition Bloc. In the event, the party only won 3.23% of the vote, failing to get the 5% needed to gain seats in parliament.

In the 2020 Odesa local election Trukhanov was again a candidate for mayor of Odesa (nominated by Trust Deeds). Trukhanov defeated Mykola Skoryk of Opposition Platform – For Life in the second round of the mayoral election on 15 November 2020, 54.28% of the voters voted for him.

After the full-scale Russian invasion of Ukraine began, Trukhanov created a working group of historians with diverse perspectives on historical facts. The Odesa city government negotiated with the head of the UNESCO World Heritage Center, Lazare Eloundou Assomo, to form a working group including members of Italy's Ministry of Culture, researchers from the Polytechnic University of Turin, members of the UNESCO nomination committee, and Odesa historians, cultural experts, and architects. This collaboration led to the Historic Centre of Odesa receiving World Heritage status.

In May 2025, Trukhanov, together with members of parliament, represented Ukraine at the Parliamentary Forum on Security in Madrid, discussing the challenges cities face during wartime.

On 14 October 2025, Trukhanov was effectively removed from his post of mayor of Odesa after being stripped of his Ukrainian citizenship by a decree of Ukrainian president Volodymyr Zelenskyy. The following day President Zelenskyy created the Odesa city military administration to govern the city. Appointed head of the Odesa military administration was Serhiy Lysak.

== Corruption and alleged criminal past ==
In 2016, the leaked Panama Papers claimed that Trukhanov, according to the Italian State Police Deputy Commissioner, trained members of a Ukrainian criminal gang in "hand-to-hand combat and sniper shooting with high precision weapons".

As part of an investigation, Trukhanov was detained upon his arrival in Ukraine, at Ukraine's Boryspil International Airport on 14 February 2018 suspected of embezzlement of property through abuse of power. He was later released on bail. In July 2019, the Odesa District Court found Mayor Gennadiy Trukhanov and other defendants not guilty.

He has been named as part of a Ukrainian crime syndicate who laundered money through London by buying multi-million pound properties in the city. In October 2022 he was charged in an ongoing corruption investigation concerning $18.5 million in municipal losses, and on 4 May 2023 he was detained on charges of embezzling $2.5 million in city funds. He was released the next day after paying $350,000 bail.

=== Charges of official negligence ===
On 28 October 2025, the National Police of Ukraine handed Trukhanov and eight other officials a notice of suspicion in a case of negligence that resulted in the deaths of nine people. On 21 January 2026, the Pechersky Court of Kyiv replaced Trukhanov's house arrest with a personal commitment. The court also ordered the removal of Trukhanov's electronic bracelet.

== Russian citizenship scandal ==
In 2016, the leaked Panama Papers said that Trukhanov held Russian citizenship, despite Ukrainian law banning dual citizenship. Trukhanov denied the allegation. The Panama Papers also show that he has "a substantial business empire in Ukraine through companies registered in the British Virgin Islands", with a suburb of Moscow listed as his place of residence. On 9 April 2016, Eduard Hurvits, ex-mayor of Odesa, affirmed that Trukhanov possesses three foreign passports: two Russian and one Greek. Trukhanov in 2017, through a Russian court, annulled his Russian passport.

A petition to revoke Trukhanov's Ukrainian citizenship was posted on Ukrainian president Volodymyr Zelenskyy's website on 13 October 2025. It gained more than 28,000 signatures. On 14 October, Trukhanov was stripped of Ukrainian citizenship through a decree signed by President Zelenskyy. A Russian foreign travel passport that the Security Service of Ukraine (SBU) said belonged to Trukhanov was released. Trukhanov said that these documents were falsified and denied involvement with Russia and vowed to take legal action against the Ukrainian government. The passport indicates it was issued in 2015, with an expiration date of 15 December 2025. Losing Ukrainian citizenship effectively removed Trukhanov from office as mayor of Odesa. The following day, President Zelenskyy decreed that for the time being Odesa will be governed by the newly created Odesa city military administration. The authenticity of the passport was doubted by The Insider. Its lead investigative journalist Christo Grozev called the passport "demonstrably fake" adding that it was likely to have originated from Russian active measures.
