= 2015 Ukrainian local elections =

Local elections in Ukraine

- 25 October 2015; 15 November 2015 (second round); Nov. 2015–Jan. 2016 and 27 March 2016 (repeat elections) (Note: Repeat elections in 82 locations throughout Ukraine have been scheduled for 29 November 20 December, 27 December 3 January, 10 January, and 17 January. And early mayoral elections in Kryvyi Rih on 27 March 2016.)

158,399 deputies / 10,051 mayors

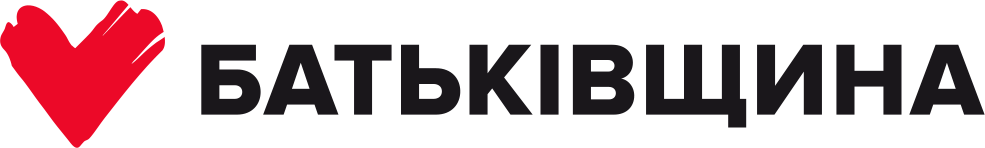

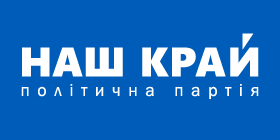

	First party	Second party	Third party
Party	Petro Poroshenko Bloc	Batkivshchyna	Our Land
Seats won	8,764 / 609	8,004 / 369	4,478 / 157
Percentage	5.61% / 6.11%	5.12% / 3.70%	2.87% / 1.57%
	Fourth party	Fifth party
Party	Opposition Bloc	Radical Party
Seats won	4,026 / 80	2,476 / 48
Percentage	2.58% / 0.80%	1.58% / 0.48%
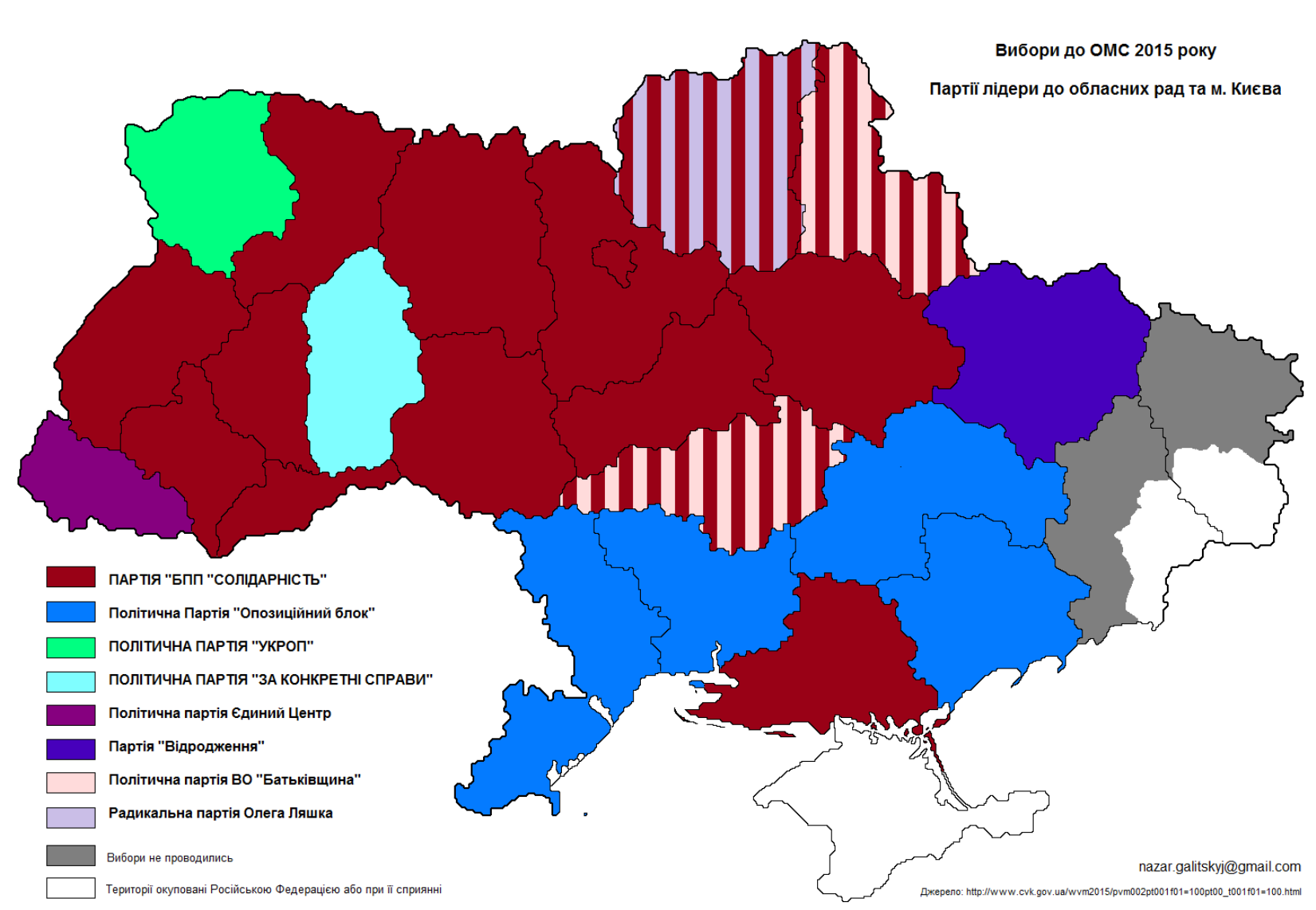
- Results of the 2015 Ukrainian local elections by oblast.

On 25 October 2015 local elections took place in Ukraine. The elections were conducted a little over a year since the 2014 snap local elections, which were only held throughout parts of the country. A second round of voting for the election of mayors in cities with more than 90,000 residents where no candidate gained more than 50% of the votes were held on 15 November 2015.

Because of the ongoing conflict in East Ukraine and the February 2014 annexation of Crimea by Russia, local elections were not conducted throughout all of the administrative subdivisions of Ukraine.

The highest number of seats were won by the Petro Poroshenko Bloc "Solidarity", All-Ukrainian Union "Fatherland", Our Land, Opposition Bloc and the Radical Party. The Petro Poroshenko Bloc did well in the western regions, central Ukraine, and the Kherson Oblast of the south. The Opposition Bloc gained most of the votes of the south and east (except Kharkiv Oblast). In the west, Svoboda improved its performance compared with previous year's parliamentary election.

A total of 132 political parties took part in the elections. The political parties contested for the 1,600 regional council seats in 22 regional parliaments, more than 10,700 local councils and mayoral seats. The voter turnout was 46.62% of the population. During the second round, the voter turnout dropped to 34.08%.

== Background ==
Late January 2014 the Constitutional Court of Ukraine made a decision declaring that regardless of under which conditions the previous elections were conducted, regularly scheduled local elections must occur in October 2015.

The Central Election Commission of Ukraine asked the government to allocate ₴1.2 billion (approx. 100 million USD) towards financing the election (on 9 July 2014)

The campaign for the elections started on 5 September 2015. But since the start of the summer political advertising had begun to increase rapidly. This was marred with a sharp rise of handouts by potential candidates. Local issues were ignored by parties, who focused on national issues. According to Depo.ua and the Committee of Voters of Ukraine, political parties spend at least $82 million on campaigning. They claim that during the last two months of the campaign political parties rented 75 percent of Ukraine's 20,000 billboards.

More than 350,000 candidates (representing 132 political parties or as an independent candidate) were electable for 168,450 positions of mayors of cities, villages and settlements and for deputies of village, settlement, city, city district, district and 1,600 regional council seats in 22 regional councils. Candidates did not have to live in a constituency where they were sought office.

=== Elections in Crimea and Donbas ===
Because of the March 2014 unilateral annexation of Crimea by Russia, the elections could not be held throughout Crimea.

With the ongoing Russian aggression against Ukraine in Donbas, elections were not held in regional councils and some parts of Donetsk and Luhansk oblasts.

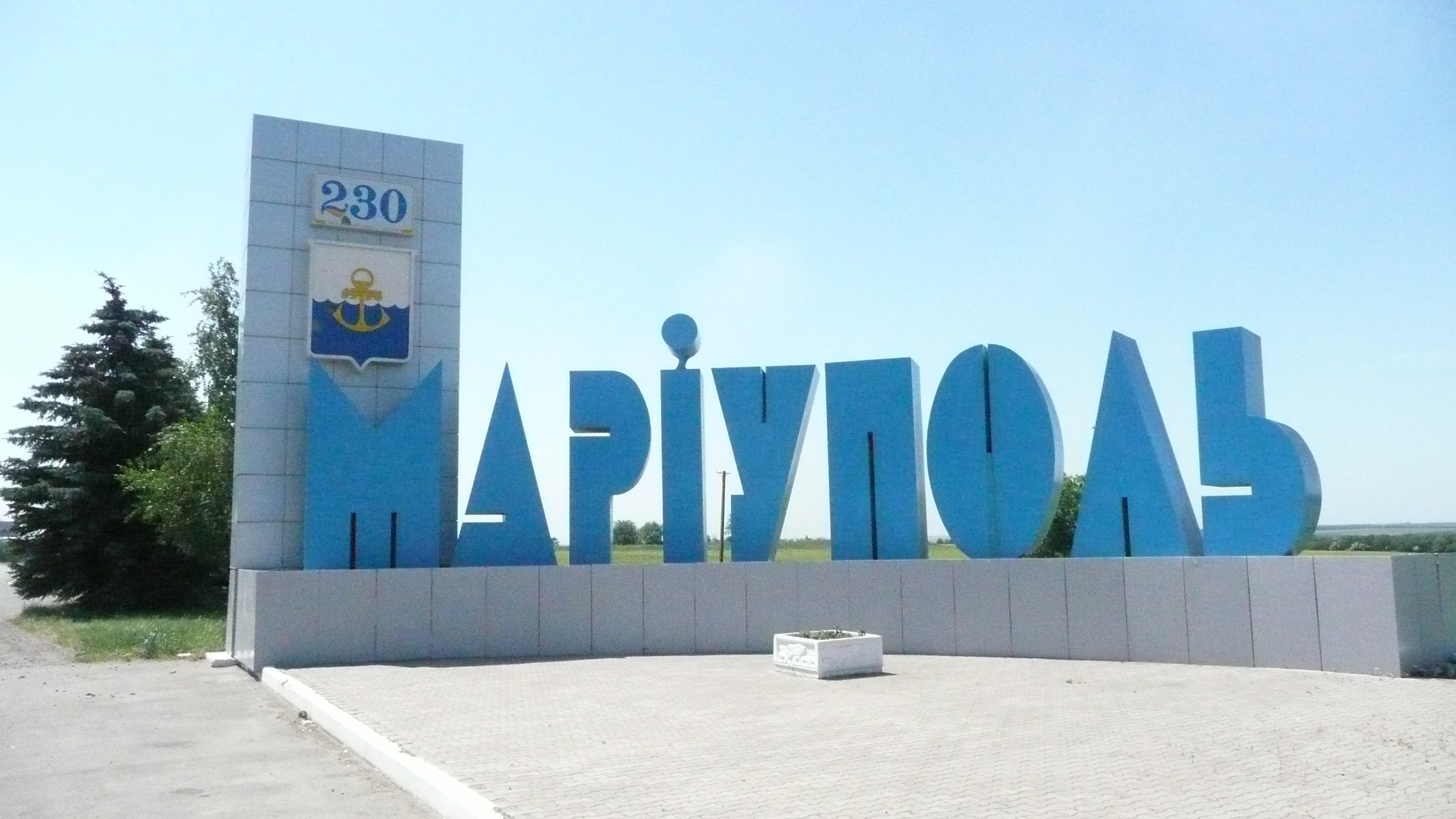
Mariupol entry sign written in Ukrainian

On 25 October 2015, the elections were not held in certain government-held towns (in south-east Ukraine) close to the frontline because (it was believed in August 2015) there "voting may be dangerous to people's lives". These towns include Avdiivka, Marinka, Artemivsk and Kostiantynivka. While in other towns near the frontline, like Mariupol, the elections were decided to be held.

== Changes in the law ==
Parties registered 365 days before the election and who had not changed their name 180 days before the election were allowed to participate in the elections. On 14 July 2015, the Ukrainian parliament passed a new law regarding the local elections in the country. This law upgraded the election threshold from 3% to 5% (in order to get any seats in the council a party has to score 5% of the total vote of the election). It also introduced three electoral systems for (these) local elections:

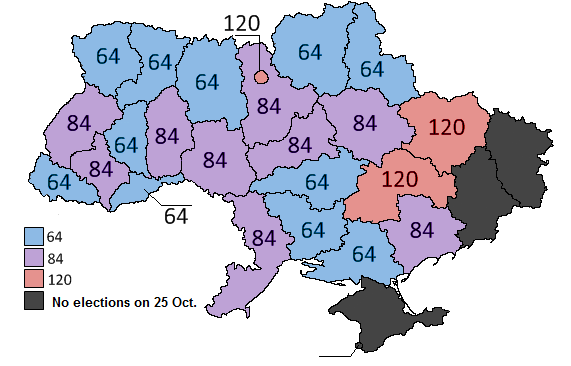
The number of deputies elected to regional councils varies by population; the lowest is 64, while the highest is 120.

1. Mayors and deputies of settlement and village councils directly elected under a majoritarian system; in a first-past-the-post system.
2. In cities with fewer than 90,000 voters Mayors are elected under a majoritarian system; in a first-past-the-post system. Region, district, city, and city district councils are elected in multi-member constituencies meaning that for the elections for the city council or district council their territory is split into constituencies. In these constituencies the parties nominated their candidates in closed party lists. Independent candidates can not take part in the elections in places bigger than a village or settlement. If a party passed the 5% election threshold the number of candidates from that party represented in a council will be established in accordance with the number of votes for a deputy in a certain constituency. Ballots have a check box for each party, rather than for individual candidates. Political parties in Ukraine can only register with the Ministry of Justice if they can "demonstrate a base of support in two-thirds of Ukraine's Oblasts" (Ukraine's 24 primary administrative units).
3. If in a city with more than 90,000 voters (at the time of the elections this was 35 cities) the highest scoring mayoral candidate does not score over 50% of the votes + 1 vote a second round of the election will be held no later than 3 weeks after the election (in these elections that meant all second round elections on 15 November 2015).

A proposition of the minimum number of deputies in a local council was to be 10 in places were the number of voters does not go above 500. The maximum number of Deputies in a council is 80 in places with more than 1.5 million voters. However, the proposition was not passed and the composition of local councils was preserved according to the law originally adopted on 14 July 2015. According to the article 16 the composition of local council is defined by the number of voters which is set at a minimum 12 deputies for up to 1,000 voters and a maximum 120 deputies for over 2 million voters. The composition of the Supreme Council of Autonomous Republic of Crimea is defined by the Constitution of Autonomous Republic of Crimea.

A year after election voters can achieve a recall election if the collect as many signatures as voters.

On the party list at least 30% have to be of the opposite sex as the other candidates. However, there are no legal sanctions if a party does not comply.

Refugees of the war in Donbas and people who moved out of Crimea after the 2014 Russian invasion of Crimea can not vote in the election if they are not registered as voters in the places they fled to.

The new law also implemented election of starosta post which was introduced with the 2015 administrative reform. With the creation of new territorial communities, which started in the summer of 2015, voters are able to elect new leadership.

== Results ==
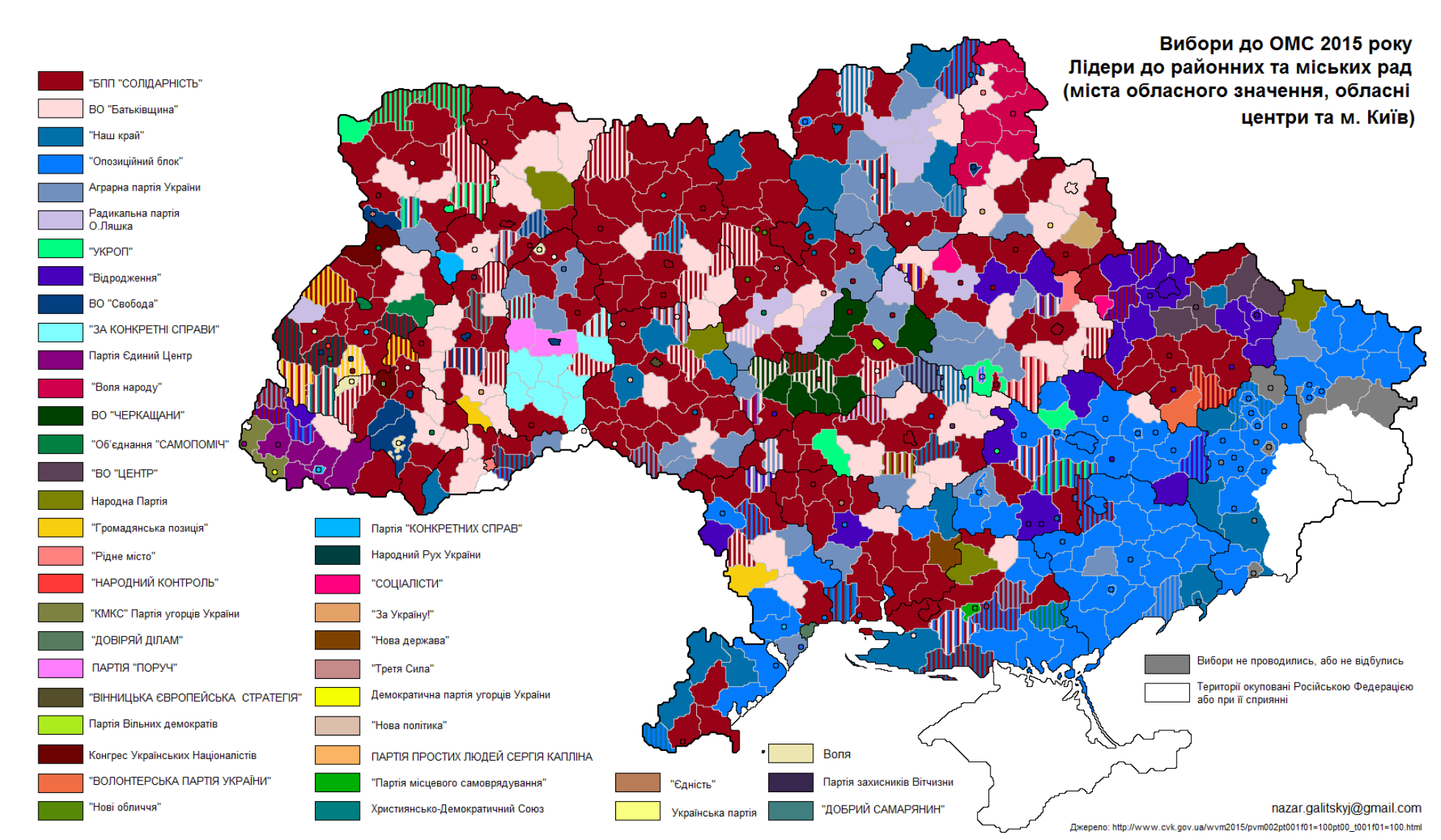
Results of the 2015 local election by raions (districts).

=== Election summary ===
In the election Petro Poroshenko Bloc "Solidarity", Fatherland and Our Land won the largest number of seats, followed by Opposition Bloc and Radical Party.

Petro Poroshenko Bloc did well in West and central Ukraine and Kherson Oblast. Fellow coalition partners in the second Yatsenyuk Government Self Reliance performed unconvincingly, with about 10 percent of the votes nationwide. (Coalition member People's Front did not take part in the elections, at the time Fatherland was also a member of the coalition.) Former coalition member Radical Party trailed behind Petro Poroshenko Bloc and Fatherland.

Only Petro Poroshenko Bloc, Fatherland, Self Reliance and Radical Party won votes throughout the country.

In Southern and Eastern Ukraine Opposition Bloc gained most votes, but in Kharkiv Oblast, Revival gained most votes.

In Western Ukraine Svoboda improved its performance compared with the 2014 Ukrainian parliamentary election.

In 29 cities a second round of mayoral elections was held on 15 November 2015.

==== Number of elected deputies per administrative division ====
Lvl	Territories		Populated places		Total
1	Oblasts	1698/1700	Kyiv	120/120	1818/1820
2	Raions	16147/16167	Cities R/S	5195/5200	21342/21367
3	Cities D/S, Settlements, Villages			108328/108529	108328/108529
Total					131488/131716

==== Number of elected heads of local councils in populated places ====
Lvl	Heads of local councils of	Total
1	Kyiv	1
2	Cities R/S	143/145
3	Cities D/S, Settlements, Villages	7350/7366
Total		7494/7512

=== Mayor (selected cities) ===
==== Kyiv ====
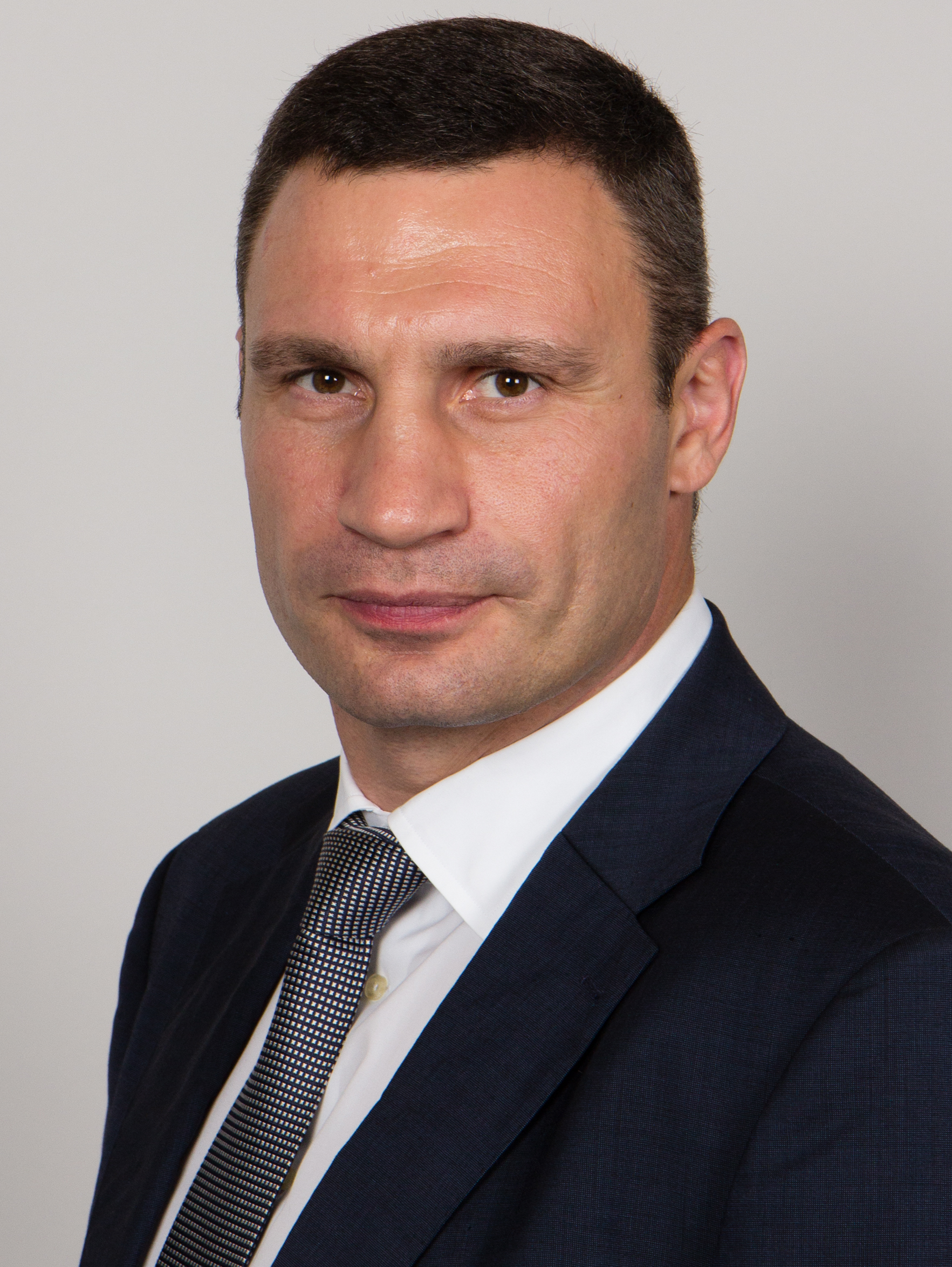
Vitali Klitschko

In Kyiv incumbent Mayor Vitali Klitschko and Boryslav Bereza competed in a second round of the mayoral election after Klitschko scored 40.5% of the vote and Bereza 8.8% in the first round. Klitschko won this second round with 66.5%; Bereza gained 33.51% of the votes.

Former mayor Oleksandr Omelchenko came third with 8.4%, followed by Volodymyr Bondarenko with 7.86% and Serhiy Husovsky with 7.7%.

The voter turnout in the first round of the election was 41.87%. In the second round of the election the turnout was 28.35%.

==== Kharkiv ====
In Kharkiv incumbent Mayor Hennadiy Kernes was re-elected in the first round of the election with 65.8% of the votes; with a voter turnout of 44.4%. Taras Sytenko came second with 12.31%, followed by Yuriy Sapronov with 5.08%. Voter turnout was 42.41%.

==== Dnipropetrovsk ====
Also in Dnipropetrovsk a second round of the mayoral election was held after Borys Filatov scored 37.94% and Oleksandr Vilkul 35.78% in the first round of the election. Zahid Krasnov finished third with 12.42%. In the second round Filatov was elected Mayor with 53.76% of the votes.

==== Odesa ====
In Odesa incumbent Mayor Gennadiy Trukhanov defeated Oleksandr Borovyk with 52.9% against 25.7% in the first round of the mayoral election. Former Mayor Eduard Gurwits came in third with 8.5% of the vote.

==== Zaporizhzhia ====
In the mayoral election of Zaporizhzhia Volodymyr Buriak or Mykola Frolov gained most votes in the first round of the election. Buriak gained 22.9% and Frolov 18.9% of the vote. In the second round 58.48% of the votes supported Buriak as Mayor.

Hence, incumbent Oleksandr Sin was not reelected after gaining (in the first round of the election) 9% of the vote.

=== Voter turnout ===
Turnout of the elections was 46.62% nationwide. The highest participation was in Western Ukraine (around 50%), lowest was in the Donbas region (slightly above 30%). The turnout was typical of rates across Europe.

In the second round of the mayoral election the turnout was 34.08%.

== Conduct ==
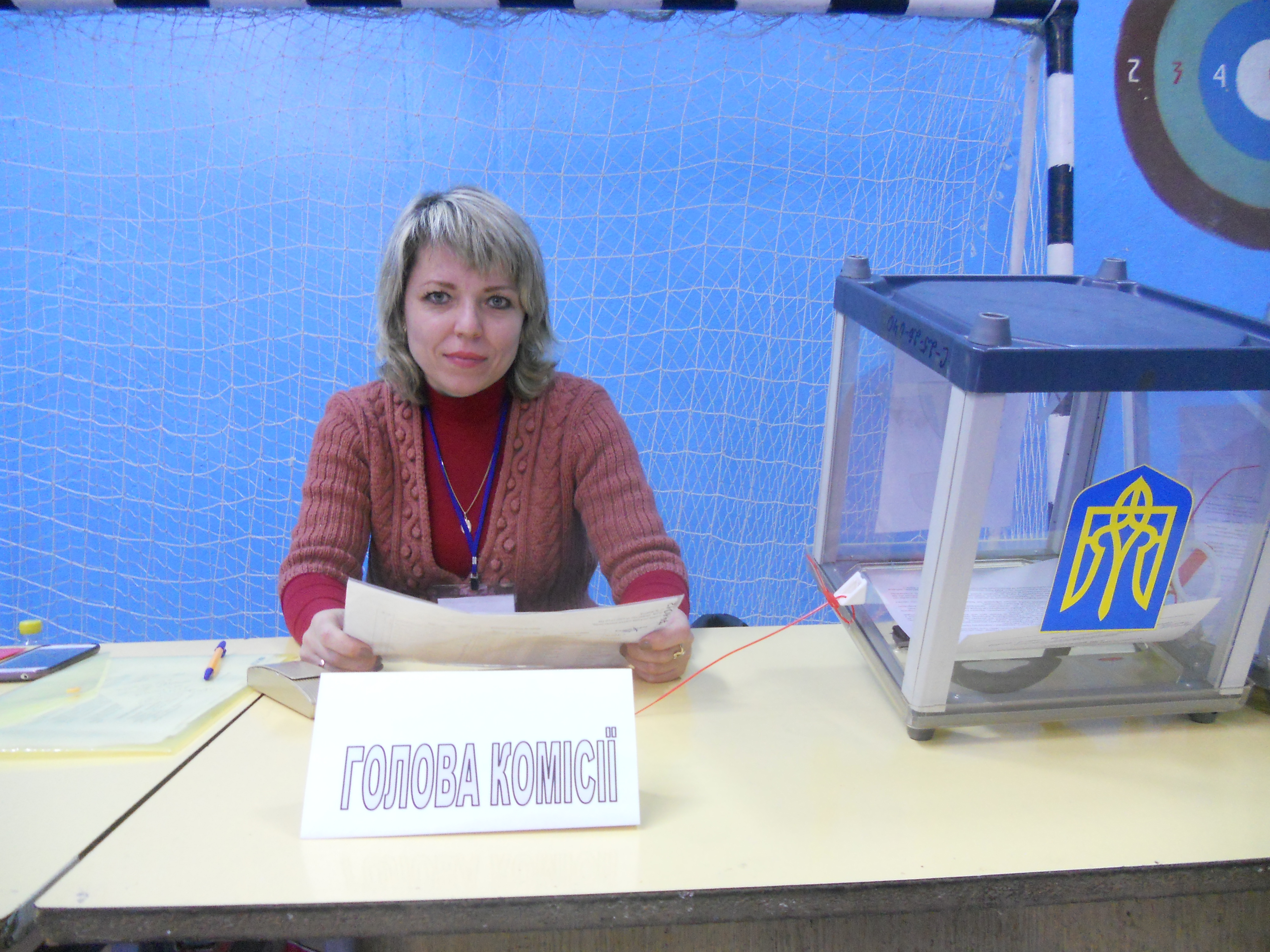
Chairperson of a local electoral commission in Chernihiv on 15 November 2015.

1.554 international observers to the elections were registered by the Central Election Commission of Ukraine.

Council of Europe observers were positive about the electoral process.

The OSCE observer mission was also positive about the electoral process, but it argued that the electoral legislation needed improvement.

The European Network of Election Monitoring Organizations observer mission qualified 15 November second round of mayoral elections as "generally held in line with international standards".

=== Absence of elections in areas of the Donbas ===
No elections took place on 25 October 2015 in Mariupol, Krasnoarmiisk and Svatove because there the majority of elections commission's members refused to accept the election ballots because of faulty ballots. In Mariupol, allegations were made by pro-Euromaidan parties that the printing house owned by Rinat Akhmetov had manipulated the ballots to help Opposition Bloc (whose mayoral candidate Vadym Boychenko worked in a company owned by Akhmetov).

On 6 November 2015, the local election committee set the date for local elections in Svatove for the next 27 December.

On 10 November, the Ukrainian parliament set the date for local elections in Krasnoarmiisk and Mariupol for the following 29 November. In Mariupol Vadym Boychenko won this (mayoral) election (with a 36.49% voter turnout). The ENEMO-mission in Krasnoarmiisk and Mariupol was mildly positive about the elections.

=== Mayoral re-elections in Kryvy Rih ===
On 15 November Opposition Bloc Yuriy Vilkul was declared winner of the second round of the mayoral elections in Kryvyi Rih. But runner-up Yuriy Myloboh of Self Reliance filed complaints about the violations of the electoral process. The Verkhovna Rada (on 23 December 2015) set early elections of the mayor of Kryvyi Rih on 27 March 2016. According to NGO's OPORA and Committee of Voters of Ukraine these re-elections were marked by large-scale bribery, the use of administrative resources and other violations. Vilkul won the re-election with 74.18% of the vote; followed by Semen Semenchenko for Self Reliance with 10.92%. Voter turnout on 27 March 2016 was 55.77%.
