= Rouslan Bodelan =

Ukrainian politician (1942–2025)

- Руслан Боделан
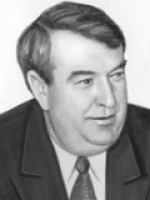
- Bodelan in 1990

3rd Mayor of Odesa
- In office August 1998 – 5 April 2005
- Preceded by: Eduard Hurvits
- Succeeded by: Eduard Hurvits

Member of the Verkhovna Rada
- In office 11 May 1994 – 6 February 1997

1st Governor of Odesa Oblast
- In office 11 July 1995 – 5 May 1998
- President: Leonid Kuchma
- Prime Minister: Yevhen Marchuk; Pavlo Lazarenko; Valeriy Pustovoitenko
- Preceded by: position created
- Succeeded by: Serhiy Hrynevetskyi

Member of the Verkhovna Rada
- In office 14 December 1992 – 10 May 1994

Chairman of the Odesa Regional executive committee
- In office 28 January 1991 – March 1992
- Preceded by: Anatoliy Butenko
- Succeeded by: position abolished

Personal details
- Born: 4 April 1942 Berezivka, Transnistria Governorate, Kingdom of Romania
- Died: 26 June 2025 (aged 83)
- Party: Independent

Rouslan Borysovych Bodelan (Ukrainian: Руслан Борисович Боделан, Russian: Руслан Борисович Боделан; 4 April 1942 – 26 June 2025) was a Ukrainian politician.

== Life and career ==
=== Soviet times ===
Bodelan started his career in 1959 as a sports coach and teacher in a secondary school. In 1961, he began his work at the "Odessilbud" construction company (within its Construction and Field Assembly Department #14) in Balta.

Beginning in 1964, Bodelan was active in politics, as a member and functionary in Komsomol, Communist Party of the Soviet Union and other Soviet organizations. In 1965, he became a First Secretary (Head) of Kiliia Raion Komsomol Organization. His top position in the CPSU was the First Secretary of Odesa Regional Committee, which he occupied in April 1990.

=== Career in independent Ukraine ===
On 3 April 1990, Bodelan was elected as a member of the Odesa Oblast Soviet (council). He was later elected as Chairman of this council and occupied this position up to April 1998. Simultaneously, Bodelan was head of Odesa Oblast State Administration (i.e. governor) in July 1995 – May 1998, member of the Verkhovna Rada (parliament) of Ukraine in 1994–1998, a member of Maritime Policy Commission under President of Ukraine in 1995–1998, and head of the Commonwealth of Danube States' Executive Group in 1996–1997.

In August 1998, Bodelan was elected mayor of Odesa. He was re-elected as mayor in 2002, but the election results were challenged in the courts. In 2005, an Odesa court ruled the elections void and proclaimed Eduard Gurvits the legal Mayor of Odesa.

While mayor, Bodelan allegedly took active part in a wide-range electoral fraud in favor of pro-government candidates during the 2004 presidential election. After the Orange Revolution he fled to Russia. An investigation of his mayoral activities was opened soon after; Bodelan was charged with abuse of office.

=== Immigration and return ===
Bodelan was placed under an Interpol search warrant, but Russian authorities refused to extradite him. He was granted Russian citizenship in 2006 (which automatically revokes his Ukrainian citizenship) and a position of deputy director of the Saint Petersburg Sea Port. Bodelan refused to return to Ukraine voluntarily, claiming he was afraid of political prosecution by supporters of former president Viktor Yushchenko. On 9 April 2010, Bodelan returned to Odesa.

=== Death ===
Bodelan died on 26 June 2025, at the age of 83.

== Awards ==
Bodelan was awarded a number of Soviet and Ukrainian decorations and medals, including Order of the Red Banner of Labour, "Decoration of Honour" Order, Order of Merits III grade, order of St. Volodymyr II grade.

== See also ==
- List of mayors of Odesa, Ukraine

Preceded by Eduard Gurwits	Mayor of Odesa; 1998–2005	Succeeded by Eduard Gurwits
