= Robert H. Bremner =

American professor of history (1917–2002)

Robert Hamlett Bremner
- Born: May 26, 1917; Brunswick, Ohio
- Died: 2002
- Occupation: Historian
- Years active: 1950s - 1990s
- Spouse: Catherine
- Children: Two daughters
- Parent(s): George L. Bremner and Sue Hamlett Bremner

Academic background
- Education: Baldwin Wallace College BA (1938); Ohio State University MA (1939), PhD (1943)
- Alma mater: Ohio State University

Academic work
- Discipline: History
- Sub-discipline: Philanthropy, social history
- Main interests: social thought, social welfare, philanthropy, and poverty
- Notable works: American Philanthropy (1960)

Robert Hamlett Bremner (1917–2002) was professor emeritus of history at the Ohio State University in Columbus, Ohio where he taught from 1946 until he retired in 1980. He is the author of American Philanthropy (1960) which was republished in a revised edition in 1988, The Public Good: Philanthropy and Welfare in the Civil War Period in 1980, and Giving: Charity and Philanthropy in History in 1996.

== Education ==
His BA was from Baldwin Wallace College in 1938. He earned his MA in 1939 and his PhD in 1943 from Ohio State University.

== Early career ==
He worked with the Department of War in World War II and was stationed in Europe and in Washington, D.C.

== Career ==
His American Philanthropy published in 1960 is considered to be a classic. He published The Public Good: Philanthropy and Welfare in the Civil War Period in 1980, The Discovery of Poverty in the United States in 1992, and Giving: Charity and Philanthropy in History in 1996. His archives are held at Ohio State University.

== Academic career ==
At Ohio State University, he taught from 1946 until his retirement in 1980 as emeritus Professor of History.

== Appointments ==
He served on the President's Science Advisory Committee.
