= List of mayors of Odesa =

Throughout Odesa, Ukraine's history, the office of Novorossiya Governor and Odesa mayor was closely aligned and often was held by the same leader.

As of 15 October 2025, Odesa had been placed under a city military administration headed by Serhiy Lysak.

== List of mayors ==
Mayors of Odesa, Ukraine
Mayor	Term	Governor General of Novorossiia	Term	Notes
Zheleztsov, Andrey (Андрей Железцов)	1796–1797	Zubov, Platon Prince (Платон Александрович Зубов)	1792/1794/1795 - 1796	Novorossiya Governor office created
		Berdyaev, Nikolai (Николай Михайлович Бердяев)	1796–1797	
Portnov, Larion F. (Ларион Федорович Портнов)	1797–1800	Kahovsky, Mikhail (Михаил Васильевич Каховский)	1797–1800	
Kafedzhi, Ivan (Kafadzhi) (Иван Кафеджи [Кафаджи])	1800–1803	Mikhelson, Ivan (Иван Иванович Михельсон)	1800–1803	
		Bekleshev, Alexander (Александр Андреевич Беклешев)	1803–1804	
Richelieu (Ришелье)	1803–1814	Richelieu	1805–1814	Office of Governor General and Mayor combined during Richelieu's tenure.
Amvrosy, Ivan Amvrosievich (Иван Амвросиевич Амвросий)	1806–1809			
Androsov, Ivan (Иван Андросов)	1809–1812			
Androsov, Semen (Семен Андросов)	1812–1815			
Kolbe, Thomas				Temporary appointment
Langeron (Александр Фёдорович Ланжерон)	January 1, 1816 - 1820	Langeron	January 1, 1816 - 1822	
Protasov, Yakov (Яков Протасов)	1815–1818			
Inglezi, Dmitriy Spiridonovich (Дмитрий Спиридонович Инглези)	1818–1821			
Tregubov, Nikolai Yakovlevich (Николай Яковлевич Трегубов)	May 1820 - June 1822	Inzov, Ivan Nikitovich (Иван Никитович Инзов)	July 1822 – May 23, 1823	
Guryev, Alexander Dmitrievich (Александр Дмитриевич Гурьев)	1822-1825	Vorontsov, Mikhail Semenovich (Михаил Семенович Воронцов)	1823–1854	
Luchich, Philip Lukyanovich (Филипп Лукьянович Лучич)	1824-1827 1830-1833 1839-1842	Krasovskiy, Afanasy Ivanovich (Афанасий Иванович Красовский)	1826	
Neydgardt, Pavel Ivanovich (Павел Иванович Нейдгардт)	1825–1826			
Pahlen, Fyodor Petrovich (Федор Петрович Пален)	1826-1828 1826,1830-1832	Fyodor Petrovich Pahlen (Федор Петрович Пален)	1826–1828 1826, 1830-1832	
Avchinnikov, Ivan Vasilievich (Иван Васильевич Авчинников)	1827-1830			
Bogdanovskiy, A–ndrey Vasilyevich (Андрей Васильевич Богдановский)	1828-1831			
Levshin, Aleksey Irakliyevich (Алексей Ираклиевич Левшин)	1831-1837			
Novikov, Ilya (Илья Новиков)	1833-1836			
Rostovtsev, Pavel (Павел Ростовцев)	1836-1839			
Tolstoy, Alexander Petrovich (Александр Петрович Толстой)	1837-1840			
Akhlestyshev, Dmitriy Dmitrievich (Дмитрий Дмитриевич Ахлестышев)	1840-1848			
Papudov, Konstantin Fotevich (Константин Фотьевич Папудов)	1842-1845			
Novikov, Yakov Ilyich (Яков Ильич Новиков)	1845-1848			
Kortatsii, James (Джеймс Кортации)	1848-1857	Fedorov, Pavel Ivanovich (Павел Иванович Федоров)	1848-1854	
Kaznacheev, Alexander Ivanovich (Александр Иванович Казначеев)	1848-1854			
Kruzenshtern, Nikolai Ivanovich (Николай Иванович Крузенштерн)	1854-1856	Annenkov, Nikolai Nikolayevich (see: General Nicholas Annenkov) (Николай Николаевич Анненков)	1854-1855	
Alopeus, Fedor Davydovich (Федор Давыдович Алопеус)	1856-1857	Stroganov, Alexander Grigoriyevich	1855-1862/1863	Stroganov was governor general of Bessarabia also.
Gari, Yakov Yegorovich (Яков Егорович Гари)	1857-1860			
Mestmakher, Pavel Fedorovich (Павел Федорович Местмахер)	1857-1861			
Yakhnenko, Semen Stepanovich (Семен Степанович Яхненко)	1860-1863			
Antonovich, Platon Alexandrovich (Платон Александрович Антонович)	1861-1863	Kotzebue, Pavel Evstafevich (Павел Евстафьевич Коцебу)	December 12, 1863 - 1874	
Pashkov, Aleksey (Алексей Пашков)	1863			
Velio, Ivan Osipovich (Иван Осипович Велио)	1863-1865			
Vorontsov, Seymon Mikhaylovich (Семен Михайлович Воронцов)	1863-1867			
Shidlovsky, Mikhail Nikolayevich (Михаил Николаевич Шидловский)	1865-1868			
Nikolay Novoselsky (Николай Александрович Новосельский)	1867-1878			
Bukharin, Nikolai Ivanovich (Николай Иванович Бухарин)	1868-1876			
		Temporary governor general		
Levashev, Vladimir Vasilyevich (Владимир Васильевич Левашев)	1876-1878	Totleben, Eduard Ivanovich	1879	
Marazli, Grigory Grigorevich (Григорий Григорьевич Маразли)	1880 – 1895			
Heintz, Alexander Constantinovich (Александр Константинович Гейнц)	1878-1880	Totleben, Edward Ivanovich (Эдуард Иванович Тотлебен)	1879-1880	
Knop, Karl Germanovich (Карл Германович Кноп)	1880	Drenteln, Alexander Romanovich (Александр Романович Дрентельн)	1880-1881	
Gudim-Levkovich, Sergey Nikolayev (Сергей Николаев Гудим-Левкович)	1880-1881	Dondukov-Korsakov, Alexander Mikhaylovich (Александр Михайлович Дондуков-Корсаков)	1881-1882	
Tukholka, Lev Fedorovich (Лев Фёдорович Тухолка)	1881-1882			
Kossagovskiy, Pavel Pavlovich (Павел Павлович Коссаговский)	1882-1885	Gurko, Joseph Vladimirovich (Иосиф Владимирович Гурко)	1882-1883	
Zelenoy, Pavel Alekseyevich (Павел Алексеевич Зеленой)	1885-1898	Roop, Christopher Khristoforovich (Христофор Христофорович Рооп)	1883-1885 1885-1890	Office of the governor general abolished in 1890.
Kryzhanovskiy, Peter Adamovich (Петр Адамович Крыжановский)	1897, 1905			
Shuvalov, Pavel Pavlovich (Павел Павлович Шувалов)	1898-1903			
Zelenoy, Pavel Alexeevich (Павел Алексеевич Зеленой)	1897-1905			
Arsenev, Dmitriy Gavrilovich (Дмитрий Гаврилович Арсеньев)	1903			
Dmitriy Borisovich Neydgardt, (Дмитрий Борисович Нейдгардт)	1903-1905			
Semen Petrovich Yaroshenko, (Семен Петрович Ярошенко)	1905			
Vasiliy Yakovlevich Protopopov (Василий Яковлевич Протопопов)	1905-1909			
Apollon Gavrilovich Grigoryev, (Аполлон Гаврилович Григорьев)	1905-1907	Konstantin Adamovich Karangozov, (Константин Адамович Карангозов)	1905-1906	
Vasiliy Dementevich Novitskiy, (Василий Дементьевич Новицкий)	1907	Pavel Glagolev (Павел Глаголев)	1906-1907	
Ivan Nikolayevich Tolmachev, (Иван Николаевич Толмачев)	1907-1911 1907-1914			
Nikolai Ivanovich Moiseev, (Николай Иванович Моисеев)	1909-1913			
, Ivan Vasilyevich Sosnovskiy (Иван Васильевич Сосновский)	1911-1917			
Boris Aleksandrovich Pelican (Пеликан, Борис Александрович)	1913-1917	Mikhaylo Ivanovych Ebelov, (Михаил Иванович Эбелов)	1914-1917	
Mykola Antoninovych Knyazhevych, (Николай Антонинович Княжевич)	1917			
Mykhailo Vasylyovych Braykevyich (Михаил Васильевич Брайкевич)	1917, 1918			
Vasyl Ivanovych Sukhomlin, (Василий Иванович Сухомлин)	1917			
Ivan Lypa (Иван Львович Липа)	1917			
Vikentiy Mechislavovych Bohutskiy (Викентий Мечиславович Богуцкий)	1917-1918			
Volodymyr Andriyovych Mustafin (Владимир Андреевич Мустафин)	1918	Volodymyr Andriyovych Mustafin, (Владимир Андреевич Мустафин)	1918	
Oleksandr Serhiyovych Sannikov, h (Александр Сергеевич Санников)	1918	Eduard von Belts (Эдуард фон-Бельц)	1918	
Mykola Mykolayovych Bogdanovych (Николай Николаевич Богданович)	1918	Heorhiy Ottonovych Raukh (Георгий Оттонович Раух)	1918	
Yaroshevych, A.A. (А.А. Ярошевич)	1918			
Markov, V. A. (В.А. Марков)	1918-1919	Oleksiy Mykolayovych Grishin-Almazov, (Алексей Николаевич Гришин-Алмазов)	1918-1919	
Sofiya Ivanovna Sokolovskaya (Софья Ивановна Соколовская)	1919	Aleksey Vladimirovich Schwarz, (Алексей Владимирович Шварц)	1919	
Borys Fyodorovich Shtengel, (Борис Федорович Штенгель)	1919			
Vladimir Arsenyevich Kolobov, (Владимир Арсеньевич Колобов)	1919-1920			
Viktor Nikolayevich Sokira-Yakhontov, (Виктор Николаевич Сокира-Яхонтов)	1920			
Ivan Yevdokymovych Klymenko (Иван Евдокимович Клименко)	1920			
Pavel Andreyevich Kin (Павел Андреевич Кин)	1920-1921			
Yakiv Naumovych Drobnis (Яков Наумович Дробнис)	1921			
Vasily Kuzmich Averin, h (Василий Кузьмич Аверин)	1921-1923			
Andrey Vasileyvich Ivanov, (Андрей Васильевич Иванов)	1923-1925			
Kudrin, I.N. (И.Н. Кудрин)	1925			
Aleksey Lukich Trilisskiy, (Алексей Лукич Трилисский)	1925-1927			
Alekseyenko, G.P. (Г.П. Алексеенко)	1927-1931			
Yakymovich, I.K. (И.К. Якимович)	1931-1933			
Chebukin, P.V. (П.В. Чебукин)	1933-1934			
Sorokin, P.D. (П.Д. Сорокин)	1934			
Korchagin, I.P. (И.П. Корчагин)	1934-1939			
Chernitsa, I.K. (И.К. Черница)	1939-1941			
Herman Pyntya (Герман Пынтя)	1941-1944			
Davydenko, V.P. (В.П. Давыденко)	1945-1947			
Karpov, O.N. (О.Н. Карпов)	1947-1950			
Aleksandr Danilovych Stepanenko (Александр Данилович Степаненко)	1950-1955			
Gregory Feofanovich Ladvischenko, (Григорий Феофанович Ладвищенко)	1955-1960			
Aleksandr Panteleymonovich Kovalenko, (Александр Пантелеймонович Коваленко)	1960-1962			
Pavel Tsyurupa (Павел Андреевич Цюрупа)	1962-1964			
Valentyn Symonenko	1983-1994			
Leonid Cherneha	1991 - 1994			
Eduard Hurvits	1994 - 1998			
Rouslan Bodelan	1998 - 2005			
Eduard Hurvits	2005 - 2010			
Oleksiy Kostusyev	2010 - 2013			
Oleh Bryndak	2013 - 2014 (acting)			
Hennadii Trukhanov	2014 - 2025			

On 15 October 2025, Ukrainian president Volodymyr Zelenskyy decreed that Odesa had been placed under a city military administration headed by Serhiy Lysak after Mayor Hennadii Trukhanov was removed from office due to him having a Russian passport.

== See also ==
- Timeline of Odesa
