= Eduard Hurvits =

Ukrainian politician

- Едуард Гурвіц
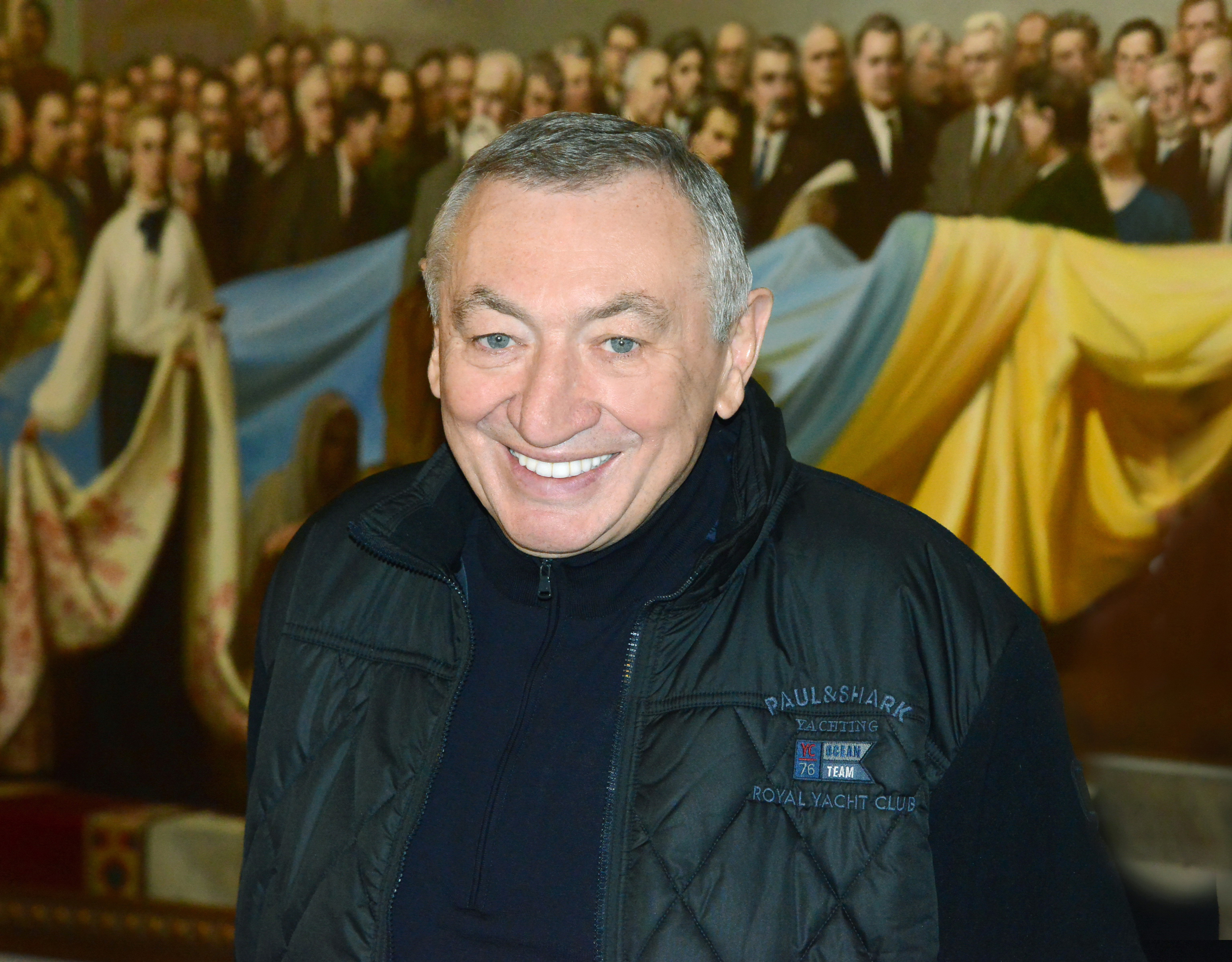
- Hurvits in 2016

Mayor of Odesa
- In office July 1994 – 26 May 1998
- Preceded by: Leonid Cherneha
- Succeeded by: Rouslan Bodelan
- In office 5 April 2005 – 6 November 2010
- Preceded by: Rouslan Bodelan
- Succeeded by: Oleksiy Kostusyev

People's Deputy of Ukraine
- In office 27 March 1994 – 26 March 2006
- Preceded by: Yuriy Romanov (Odesa Oblast, No. 294); Constituency established (Odesa Oblast, No. 136)
- Succeeded by: Constituency abolished (Odesa Oblast, No. 294); Serhii Kivalov (Odesa Oblast, No. 136)
- Constituency: Odesa Oblast, No. 294 (1994–1998); Odesa Oblast, No. 136 (1998–2002); NUNS, No. 46 (2002–2006)
- In office 28 October 2012 – 26 October 2014
- Constituency: Ukrainian Democratic Alliance for Reform, No. 17

Personal details
- Born: 30 January 1948 (age 78) Mohyliv-Podilskyi, Ukrainian SSR, Soviet Union (now Ukraine)
- Party: YeS (since 2014)
- Other political affiliations: Rukh (1994–2002); NUNS (2002–2010); Front for Change (2010); UDAR (2012–2014)

Military service
- Allegiance: Soviet Union
- Branch/service: Soviet Army
- Years of service: 1971–1972
- Rank: Private
- Unit: Strategic Rocket Forces

Eduard Yosypovych Hurvits (Ukrainian: Едуард Йосипович Гурвіц; Yiddish: עדואָרד יאָסיפּאָוויטש גוּרוויץ, romanized: Eduard Iosipovitsh Gurvitz; born 30 January 1948) is a Ukrainian politician who served as the 71st mayor of Odesa on two occasions; first from July 1994 to 26 May 1998, and then from 5 April 2005 to 6 November 2010. He also served as a People's Deputy of Ukraine on two occasions, from 27 March 1994 to 26 March 2006 and from 28 October 2012 to 26 October 2014.

Born into a Jewish family in western Ukraine, Hurvits served in the Soviet Army for one year before becoming a construction foreman in the southwestern Soviet Union. A participant in Odesan politics since 1990, Hurvits became both mayor of Odesa and a People's Deputy of Ukraine as a member of the People's Movement of Ukraine. As mayor, Hurvits clashed frequently with President Leonid Kuchma, and was removed following his re-election in 1998.

Remaining in the Verkhovna Rada (Ukraine's parliament), Hurvits became an early supporter of Viktor Yushchenko and the Orange Revolution, and was re-elected as mayor in April 2005. Hurvits' second term, however, ended in an unsuccessful attempt at re-election, with the failed attempt to host UEFA Euro 2012 in the city being a key reason for Gurvits' removal. Hurvits subsequently re-entered the Verkhovna Rada as a member of the Ukrainian Democratic Alliance for Reform in 2012, serving until the Revolution of Dignity.

== Biography ==
Eduard Yosypovych Hurvits was born on 30 January 1948 in Mohyliv-Podilskyi, in the Vinnytsia Oblast of the Ukrainian SSR, Soviet Union. He attended the Leningrad Engineering and Construction Institute and graduated as an Engineer of Communications. Hurvits was drafted into the Soviet Army in 1971, where he served as a private in the Strategic Rocket Forces. After leaving the army in 1972, he worked as a master construction foreman in Moldova and Odesa. In 1987, he created and headed one of the first Soviet manufacturing co-operatives, the Experimental and Creative Studio 'Ekopolis'. In May 1990 he was elected head of Odesa's Zhovtnevy district council, and in 1991 became the head of the Zhovtnevy district executive committee. In April 1994, Hurvits was elected as a People's Deputy of Ukraine to the Verkhovna Rada (Ukraine's parliament) from the 294th electoral district, and in July 1994, was elected Mayor of Odesa.

In March 1998, Hurvits was re-elected as mayor, by a margin of 70,000 votes. Due to pressure by then-President of Ukraine Leonid Kuchma, the Kropyvnytskyi Regional Court of Appeal declared the elections void. The same court barred Gurvits from participating in further election. It is speculated that these events were influenced by Gurvits' support of former Prime Minister Pavlo Lazarenko.

In 1999, he supported the renaming of Griboyedov Lane into Roman Shukhevych Street, saying:

We renamed Griboyedov Lane into Shukhevych Street — an enemy of the KGB who fought with KGB agents in Western Ukraine. And now our SBU is at the corner of Shukhevych and Jewish [streets].

Hurvits survived two assassination attempts and two of his close associates - Ihor Svoboda and Serhiy Varlamov - were kidnapped. (The body of Varlamov was recovered in 2005). Also in 1998, Hurvits was re-elected to the Verkhovna Rada, this time from the 136th electoral district.

In 2002, Hurvits participated in new mayoral elections, but lost to Rouslan Bodelan. Later, in 2005, the Prymorskyi district court of Odesa declared the elections invalid and proclaimed Gurvits as Mayor of Odesa. During the 2006 elections, Hurvits was formally elected Mayor of Odesa. He supported the pro-President Viktor Yushchenko political bloc, Eduard Hurvits's Bloc Our Odesa, during simultaneous elections in the Odesa City Council.

After the failure of Odesa to become one of the host city's for UEFA Euro 2012, President of the Ukrainian Association of Football Hryhoriy Surkis stated (in mid-December 2009) that "The Odesa mayor promised a lot and did little". Hurvits in 2010 was running for election for the party Front for Change. But lost these elections with 30.8 percent of the votes.

Hurvits returned to national politics as number 16 on the party list of Ukrainian Democratic Alliance for Reform for the 2012 Ukrainian parliamentary election. He was elected into the Verkhovna Rada. In the 2014 Ukrainian parliamentary election, Hurvits tried to again win a seat, placed at No. 96 of the electoral list of the Petro Poroshenko Bloc. However, the Petro Poroshenko Bloc won no more than 63 seats, and thus Hurvits did not return to the Verkhovna Rada.

In the 2015 Mayoral election of Odesa, Hurvits came in third with 8.5% of the vote.

In the 2020 Odesa local election, Hurvits was again candidate for Mayor of Odesa, nominated by the Eduard Hurvits Bloc, but was unsuccessful.

== Personal life ==
Hurvits is divorced. He has two children: a daughter, Yevgenia, born in 1975, who lives in Kyiv and a son, Stanislav, born in 1983, who lives in Haifa, Israel. He also has two grandchildren: Mariia, born in 1996, and Mykhailo, born in 1999, who are living together with their parents in Kyiv.

== See also ==
- List of mayors of Odesa, Ukraine

Preceded by Leonid A. Chernega	Mayor of Odesa; 1994–1998	Succeeded by Rouslan Bodelan
Preceded by Rouslan Bodelan	Mayor of Odesa; 2005–2010	Succeeded by Oleksiy Kostusyev
