= Civil–military administrations (Ukraine) =

Temporary local government units in Ukraine

Civil–military administrations Військово-цивільні адміністрації
- Logo of the Anti-Terrorist Center of the Security Service of Ukraine The administrations are concentrated in the Anti-Terrorist Operation Zone, shaded in pink and yellow.
- Location: Ukraine
- Found in: Donetsk, Luhansk oblasts
- Created by: Verkhovna Rada law No.141-VIII; Adopted on 26 February 2015
- Number: 14 (as of 3 March 2015)
- Additional status: Local government unit

Civil–military administrations (Ukrainian: Військово-цивільні адміністрації, romanized: Viiskovo-tsyvilni administratsii) are temporary local government units in Ukraine. They are concentrated in the Donetsk and Luhansk oblasts of eastern Ukraine, due to the ongoing War in Donbas. They are created under the aegis of the Anti-Terrorist Center of the Security Service of Ukraine. Since 15 October 2025 Odesa is also placed under a city military administration.

== Legal sphere ==
Judicially, the status of civil–military administrations was created by the Verkhovna Rada law "On the civil-military administrations" dated 3 February 2015, and signed into law by President Petro Poroshenko on 26 February 2015.

The law outlines their organization, jurisdiction, and order of activities for providing civil security, creating conditions for the normalization of life, enforcement of the rule of law, participation in combating sabotage manifestations and acts of terrorism, and the prevention a humanitarian disaster in territories where an anti-terrorist operation is being conducted.

The law stipulates that it will expire a year from the date of its publication, although its authority can be prolonged by the parliament based on a proposal of the President of Ukraine. In addition, the law will automatically expire in the case that martial law is introduced in the country or in specific territories, or if a state of war is declared.

== Designation ==
Civil–military administrations are created by the president in territories where a locally elected government (such as that of a municipality, council, or rural council) cannot exercise, or withdrew from the implementation of their constitutionally guaranteed powers.

These administrations will continue to exercise their authority until the day that the newly elected respective local government units are inaugurated into office. In the case that a civil–military administration is formed on the basis of that of an oblast or raion state administration, the administrations will continue to exercise their authority as long as the anti-terrorist operation is being conducted.

== Locations ==
On 3 March 2015, the Governor of Donetsk Oblast Oleksandr Kikhtenko announced the creation of three civil–military administrations on the territory of Donetsk Oblast. A further three civil–military administrations were also proposed by the governor: On 3 March 2015, President Poroshenko announced the creation of the following civil–military administrations:

On 15 October 2025 on Ukrainian president Volodymyr Zelenskyy decreed that Odesa had been placed under a city military administration. The same day President Zelenskyy appointed Serhiy Lysak as the head of the Odesa city military administration.

1st-level administrative divisions	2nd-level administrative divisions	Other populated settlements
Donetsk Oblast	Volnovakha Raion	
Donetsk Oblast	Marinka Raion	Krasnohorivka, city of district significance
Donetsk Oblast	Avdiivka, city of regional significance	
Donetsk Oblast	Vuhledar, city of regional significance	
Luhansk Oblast	Novoaidar Raion	Krymske village
Luhansk Oblast	Novoaidar Raion	Trokhizbenka, Kriakivka, Lobacheve, Lopaskyne, Orikhove-Donetske villages
Luhansk Oblast	Popasna Raion	Novotoshkivske urban-type settlement and Zholobok village
Luhansk Oblast	Popasna Raion	Novozvanivka and Troitske villages
Luhansk Oblast	Stanytsia-Luhanska Raion	
