= Oleksandr Boyko =

Ukrainian entrepreneur

- Олександр Леонідович Бойко
- Born: 1965 (age 60–61); Odesa, Ukrainian SSR
- Occupations: entrepreneur, owner of Automagistral-Pivden

Oleksandr Leonidovych Boyko (born 1965, Odesa, Ukrainian SSR) is a Ukrainian entrepreneur and the founder and owner of Automagistral-Pivden, the largest construction company in Ukraine. His activities have frequently been the subject of journalistic investigations, involving corruption schemes, cartel collusion, corporate raiding and misuse of budget funds. Boyko was mentioned in the Panama Papers data leak. He also has close ties to Yuriy Holyk, the coordinator of Ukraine’s Great Construction program, and is linked to the former father-in-law of Russian oligarch Roman Abramovich.

== Early life ==
Oleksandr Leonidovych Boyko was born in 1965 in Odesa, Ukraine. He graduated from the Odesa State Agrarian University.

== Career ==
He began earning his first income in the early 1990s, focusing on freight transport and construction. In 1996, he founded a closed joint-stock company called Astoria, which has since been liquidated.

By the late 2000s, Boyko's business activities had shifted towards road construction.

In 2005, he founded the company Dorozhnyk-97, and in 2006, he established Automagistral-Pivden. Boyko's group significantly expanded its business through major infrastructure projects for UEFA Euro 2012. As of 2021, these companies were listed among Ukraine's top 100 largest private companies.

During the Presidency of Volodymyr Zelenskyy, Automagistral-Pivden became the leading private contractor for the national Great Construction program.

In March 2021, the Antimonopoly Committee of Ukraine granted Boyko permission to consolidate over 50% of the shares in Automagistral-Pivden.

As of 2025, Automagistral-Pivden is responsible for approximately 22.5% of all construction work in Ukraine, making it a key player in the country’s road construction sector. It is considered the largest construction company in Ukraine as of 2025.

== Political activity ==
According to the Chesno movement, in 2006 Boyko ran for the Verkhovna Rada as part of the electoral bloc Za Soyuz, but was not elected.

== Ties to Yuriy Holyk ==
Oleksandr Boyko has close ties with Yuriy Holyk, the coordinator of the Great Construction program and a former adviser to the head of the Dnipropetrovsk Regional State Administration. According to Forbes, Holyk was responsible for coordinating Automagistral-Pivden with government agencies in his capacity as a contractor representative. It is believed that Boyko and Holyk first met in 2015, when Holyk was an adviser to the head of the Dnipropetrovsk RSA, Valentyn Reznichenko. Holyk has stated that Automagistral-Pivden is one of the few road companies that strives for quality construction. Investigative reports indicate that Holyk influenced the allocation of government contracts within the program, allegedly enabling Automagistral-Pivden to secure large contracts with limited competition. Journalists note that Holyk gave Automagistral-Pivden a "green light" in the Dnipropetrovsk Oblast, granting the company a privileged position for public contracts.

== Controversies ==
The activities of Oleksandr Boyko and his companies have repeatedly been the subject of journalistic investigations. In April 2021, journalists from the investigative program Schemes: Corruption in Detail captured Boyko at the Kyiv restaurant "Adriatic" during a lockdown, in the company of Yuriy Aristov, chairman of the Verkhovna Rada Committee on Budget and a representative of the ruling Servant of the People party. This incident raised suspicions of possible lobbying for the interests of Boyko's company, Automagistral-Pivden.

According to the investigative outlet Nashi Groshi, Automagistral-Pivden is one of the leaders of the so-called "cartel" of road construction companies in Ukraine. Other members of this cartel include Rostdorstroy, Onur Construction International, Tekhno Stroy Tsentr, and Dorozhne Budivnytstvo "Altkom". Together, these companies reportedly control approximately 65-80% of the road construction market and related infrastructure projects in Ukraine, amounting to tens of billions of hryvnias annually.

In 2020, journalists discovered that Automagistral-Pivden and other companies united in the National Association of Road Builders of Ukraine (NARBU) won over 75% of tenders announced by Ukravtodor under new procurement rules. These rules were reportedly lobbied for by Oleksandr Kubrakov, head of Ukravtodor, and his former adviser Yuriy Holyk.

In September 2022, Automagistral-Pivden was accused of attempting a raider takeover of a construction site in Hostomel, Kyiv Oblast. The company began construction work on land used by another enterprise, LLC "Vitruvia", without the required permits. The works were reportedly conducted in the interests of the local Hostomel administration to build a modular town.

In 2024, law enforcement authorities were investigating around 30 criminal cases related to the suspected embezzlement of funds intended for the construction of fortifications. The total damage was estimated at ₴20.1 billion (Ukrainian hryvnias). Automagistral-Pivden was among the contractors that received money for these projects.

== Ties to Roman Abramovich's former father-in-law ==
According to media reports, Oleksandr Boyko has business ties with Aleksandr Zhukov, former father-in-law of Russian oligarch Roman Abramovich. Zhukov is alleged to be the shadow “curator” of Hennadii Trukhanov, the mayor of Odesa, as well as the real controller of Automagistral-Pivden, which is owned by Boiko.

== Scandal over the Kryvyi Rih Water Pipeline Project ==
In 2025, Oleksandr Boyko's company, Automagistral-Pivden, became involved in a scandal related to the construction of the main water pipeline Inhulets — Southern Reservoir for supplying water to Kryvyi Rih. The contract was awarded without an open tender. The total cost of the project amounted to approximately 7.7 billion hryvnias, of which, according to a journalistic investigation by RBC-Ukraine, over 3 billion hryvnias may have been overpaid due to excessive technical solutions, inflated construction and logistics costs. Experts specifically pointed to the construction of an unnecessary pumping station, an excessive number of pipelines, and inefficient organization of material supplies. Media reports also indicated that the project was supervised by Yuriy Holyk, a former advisor to the head of the Dnipropetrovsk Regional State Administration and one of the coordinators of the Great Construction program. The National Police of Ukraine opened a criminal investigation into possible abuses and money laundering.
