= Heorhii Birkadze =

Ukrainian politician

Advisor to the Office of the President of Ukraine
- In office 2021–present

Head of Brovary District State Administration
- In office 2020–2021
- President: Volodymyr Zelenskyy

Personal details
- Born: 30 September 1980 (age 46) Kareli, Georgian SSR
- Citizenship: Ukraine
- Education: Kyiv National University of Construction and Architecture
- Occupation: politician, entrepreneur

Heorhii Avtandilovych Birkadze (Ukrainian: Георгій Автанділович Біркадзе; Georgian: გიორგი ბირკაძე; born September 30, 1980 in Kareli, Georgian SSR) is a Ukrainian politician of Georgian descent. He is a former head of the Brovary Raion State Administration (2020–2021) and currently serves as an advisor to the Office of the President of Ukraine. He is considered a close associate of Yuriy Holyk, the coordinator of the Great Construction program. Birkadze has been repeatedly implicated in corruption scandals and journalistic investigations over suspicions of "covering up" illegal sand mining in the Brovary Raion and leaking confidential information from the National Anti-Corruption Bureau of Ukraine to Yuriy Holyk. He has also been accused of receiving bribes of $100,000 per month to protect illegal activities.

== Early life ==
Heorhii Avtandilovych Birkadze was born on 30 September 1980. He is of Georgian heritage and obtained his higher education at the Kyiv National University of Construction and Architecture.

== Business ==
Birkadze began his career in the construction business, developing companies and managing projects. In 2011, he founded and headed the Stroy Garant Invest group of companies, specializing in the design and construction of engineering networks in Kyiv and the Kyiv Oblast. Companies from this group repeatedly secured contracts for sewerage repairs at major sites in Kyiv.

Birkadze also led BRK Holding Group LLC, which provided construction services.

Between 2017 and 2021, four companies linked to Birkadze (Nateko Energo Montage, Stroy Garant Group, BRK Thermotechnology, and BRK Hydrosystems) secured contracts totaling UAH 942.65 million. These and other contract executions repeatedly drew the attention of law enforcement agencies. In particular, in 2020, the National Police of Ukraine investigated suspicions that de facto owners of Nateko were involved in corrupt dealings with the Ministry of Youth and Sports of Ukraine to inflate the actual scope and cost of reconstruction work on a sports hall at the Olympic NSC Koncha-Zaspa. The total value of these works exceeded UAH 156 million.

== Political career ==
In 2020, Birkadze was appointed head of the Brovary Raion State Administration of Kyiv Oblast, with journalistic investigations alleging his involvement in protecting the sand mining mafia in the Brovary Raion. In March 2021, he was dismissed from the position.

In early 2022, he co-hosted the program Presumption of Guilt on the Dom TV channel.

Collaboration with public institutions

After his tenure in district administration, Birkadze continued his involvement in public administration and advisory activity, including cooperation with government structures on issues related to local development, infrastructure and policy implementation.

He has publicly commented on political processes, governance reforms and the work of state institutions, including the Office of the President of Ukraine. In media interviews and public appearances, he has expressed support for institutional strengthening and the role of central executive bodies in coordinating reforms and reconstruction efforts.

== Investigations ==
=== Suspicions of covering up illegal sand mining ===
During his tenure as head of the Brovary Raion State Administration (2020–2021), Heorhii Birkadze repeatedly appeared in journalistic investigations related to illegal sand mining in Kyiv Oblast. In particular, an investigation by the information portal My Kyiv Region suggested that his appointment could have been lobbied for the organization and cover-up of the "sand mafia" in the Brovary Raion. Journalists also noted that Birkadze might have received monthly "kickbacks" of up to 100,000 USD for protecting this business.

After Birkadze was dismissed as head of the Brovary RSA in March 2021, he was succeeded by Pavlo Proskochylo, whom the media called Birkadze's godfather. Proskochylo later came under law enforcement scrutiny in a case involving a bribe for a permit to leave the country for a volunteer.

=== Ties with the police-prosecutor clan of Vitaly Yarema ===
According to journalists, Heorhii Birkadze has ties with representatives of police and prosecutor structures, particularly with former Prosecutor General of Ukraine Vitaly Yarema. Yarema previously had a long career in law enforcement, including positions in the department for combating organized crime and as head of the Main Directorate of the Ministry of Internal Affairs of Ukraine in Kyiv.

Reports suggest that Birkadze might have represented the interests of this clan in matters related to construction in Kyiv. In particular, it is noted that he could have been an intermediary in resolving issues related to the allocation of land plots and obtaining construction permits, using his connections in government bodies and law enforcement structures.

== Ties to Yuriy Holyk ==
Heorhii Birkadze maintains close ties with Yuriy Holyk, the coordinator of the government's Great Construction program. These ties have been the subject of journalistic investigations, which have uncovered instances of confidential information being transferred from the National Anti-Corruption Bureau of Ukraine (NABU) to Holyk, joint involvement in tenders for the Great Construction program, and the National Military Memorial Cemetery.

=== Alleged leaks from Anti-Corruption Bureau ===
In 2024, Birkadze became the subject of a journalistic investigation for allegedly transferring confidential information from National Anti-Corruption Bureau of Ukraine to Holyk.

According to Bihus.Info, messages found on Yuriy Holyk's phone suggest that Birkadze, then an adviser at the Presidential Office, was sending him leaked National Anti-Corruption Bureau of Ukraine information. Screenshots of their correspondence appear to show Birkadze communicating with a senior NABU official.

In May 2024, the Specialized Anti-Corruption Prosecutor's Office and the National Police of Ukraine conducted searches at the homes of both Birkadze and NABU detective Valerii Poliuga as part of the investigation into the information leak. During the search of Birkadze's apartment, investigators seized an iPad Pro reportedly belonging to his daughter. The device was sent for forensic examination at the Kyiv Scientific Research Institute of Forensic Examinations.

=== Participation in Great Construction tenders ===
Investigations have also shown that companies linked to Birkadze participated in tenders for construction projects under the Great Construction program, which was coordinated by Holyk. In particular, the company SK Stroiinvest, which received over ₴4 billion in contracts, is under joint criminal investigation by NABU regarding Birkadze and Holyk. This has raised concerns of potential conflicts of interest and abuse of office.

=== Participation in the National Military Memorial Cemetery tender ===
In August 2024, Ukraine held a tender for the first phase of the National Military Memorial Cemetery, valued at ₴1.75 billion. The winning bidder was the newly formed consortium Building UA, which was created the day before submitting its bid.

One member of the consortium was Evroelitbud, based in Odesa, co-owned by Nataliya Poberezhets, who also owns the company Budvizhn (formerly BRK Transaliance), previously controlled by Sviatoslav Puzniak, a former head of a company founded by Birkadze. Other consortium members included a construction firm from Dnipro and a road construction company from Brovary.

According to journalists, Holyk's phone contained images of the memorial project, indicating his familiarity with its preparation. On 6 April 2024, prior to the tender, Birkadze traveled abroad with the chief architect of the memorial and the director of the National Military Memorial Cemetery institution, using a vehicle registered to his wife.

These facts have led to criticism from the media and suspicions of potential abuse of office by Birkadze and Holyk. Glavcom reported that companies connected to Birkadze were present in the project. Business-Censor points out the ties between the winning companies and the business partners of Birkadze The Human Rights Center ZMINA emphasizes the trips abroad taken by the participants of the tender's winning companies before the tender was held.

== Incidents ==
=== Controversial statement about "stolen" funds ===
In 2024, Heorhii Birkadze was involved in a scandal during a broadcast of the United News telethon. He was invited to comment on the second tranche of macro-financial aid to Ukraine from the EU and the allocation of funds for fortification works. During the discussion, Birkadze made a slip of the tongue, stating:

If we look at the reconstruction, today we stole… oops, we invested 37 billion in fortifications.

— Heorhii Birkadze
