= Automagistral-Pivden =

Ukrainian road construction company

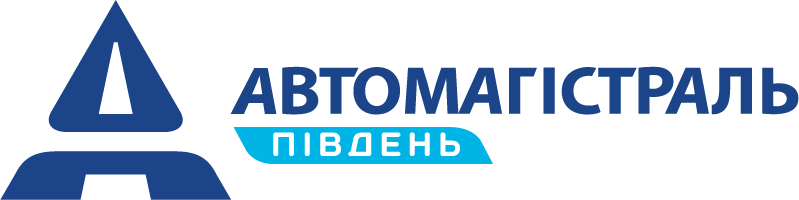
- Native name: Автомагістраль-Південь
- Company type: Limited liability company
- Industry: Road construction
- Founded: 2004
- Founder: Oleksandr Boyko
- Headquarters: Odesa, Ukraine
- Area served: Ukraine
- Key people: Oleksandr Boyko, Yuriy Boyko, Mykola Tymofieiev, Yuriy Holyk
- Products: Roads
- Services: Construction, reconstruction, road repair
- Owner: Oleksandr Boyko
- Website: www.amp.ua
- Footnotes / references One of the largest contractors in the «Great Construction» program

Automagistral-Pivden is the largest Ukrainian road construction company, founded in 2004 by entrepreneur Oleksandr Boiko.

The company specializes in the construction and reconstruction of national highways, bridges, airports, and hydraulic engineering structures, and was one of the main contractors of the "Great Construction" (Велике будівництво) state program.

== History ==
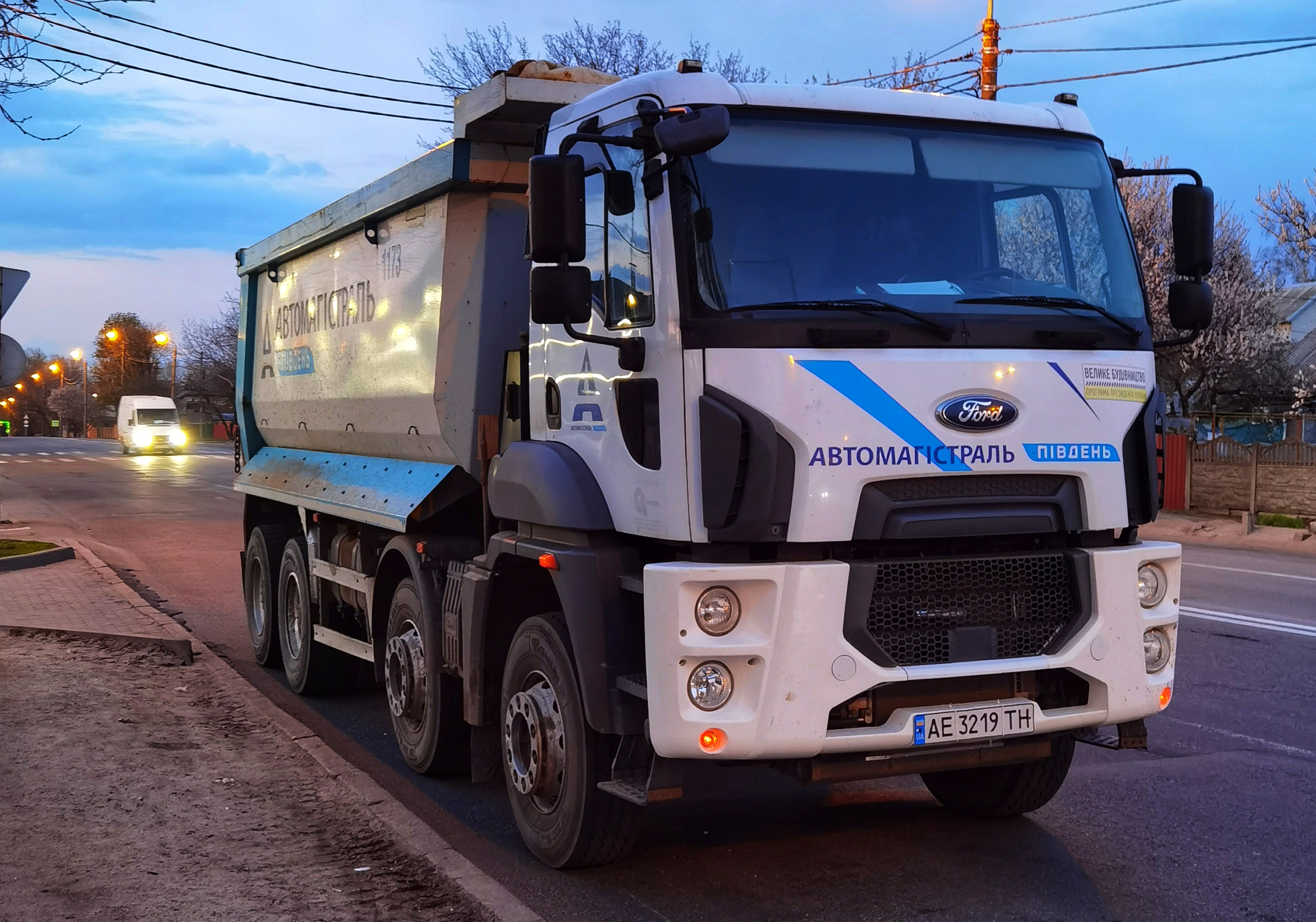
Automagistral-Pivden truck

Since 2004, Automagistral-Pivden has built and repaired more than 3,000 km (1,900 mi) of roads and restored over 40 million square meters of road surface, implementing around 300 projects. In 2021, the company was engaged in road construction and repair at 80 sites across 12 regions of Ukraine, covering more than 835 km (519 mi) of highways.

Under the presidency of Volodymyr Zelenskyy, Automagistral-Pivden became a leading private contractor in the "Great Construction" program, carrying out around 22.5% of all national construction projects, which makes it one of the system-forming companies in Ukraine’s road-building sector.

In 2024, Automagistral-Pivden ranked first in the construction sector according to Opendatabot, with a market share of 26.7%. The company’s turnover reached ₴13.2 billion, a year-on-year increase of over 60%, while tax payments to budgets at all levels amounted to ₴1.54 billion.

During the ongoing war, the company implemented several energy infrastructure protection projects, restored over 30 bridges, and re-established key logistics routes between western and eastern Ukraine. Notably, it rebuilt the bridge over the Irpin River on the Kyiv–Chop highway and the bridge over the Trubizh River on the Kyiv–Kharkiv route. In 2024, Automagistral-Pivden launched a new main water pipeline for Kryvyi Rih and constructed fortification lines in the Pokrovsk direction.

=== Role of Yurii Holyk ===
According to Forbes Ukraine, Oleksandr Boiko met Yurii Holyk—former public coordinator of the "Great Construction" program and advisor to the Dnipropetrovsk regional administration—in 2015. Holyk has described Automagistral-Pivden as "one of the few road companies striving for quality." However, journalists have suggested that Holyk’s activities may have helped the company secure large state contracts.

=== Cartel collusion ===
According to the investigative outlet Nashi Groshi, Automagistral-Pivden is one of the leaders of the so-called "cartel" of road construction companies in Ukraine. Other members of this cartel include Rostdorstroy, Onur Construction International, Tekhno Stroy Tsentr, and Dorozhne Budivnytstvo "Altkom". Together, these companies reportedly control approximately 65-80% of the road construction market and related infrastructure projects in Ukraine, amounting to tens of billions of hryvnias annually.

== Operations ==
The company’s main activities include the design, construction, and reconstruction of highways. Before the full-scale invasion, Automagistral-Pivden held over 20% of the market in road construction, repair, and maintenance. During the war, it expanded into energy infrastructure protection, fortifications, and hydraulic construction. The company employed 7,500 people before the invasion and 3,300 as of 2024.

=== Major projects ===
Largest projects in Ukraine and Europe:

- M-30 "Unity Road" (Stryi–Izvaryne)
- N-31 "Dnipro–Tsarychanka–Kobeliaky–Reshetylivka",
- Southern Bypass of Dnipro
- Truskavets Bypass
- H-12 "Sumy–Poltava"
- Stepana Bandery Avenue (Kyiv)
- Kyiv–Boryspil Expressway
- M-14 "Odesa–Melitopol–Novoazovsk"
- Dniester Hydroelectric Power Plant (HPP) infrastructure

=== Aviation infrastructure ===
In 2018, the company began constructing a new runway at Odesa International Airport (2,800 m), which was commissioned in 2021, allowing reception of wide-body aircraft such as Boeing 767 and Airbus A330. Automagistral-Pivden also reconstructed and widened the Kherson Airport runway to 45 m and completed the Satu Mare Airport runway renovation in Romania in 2024.

=== International projects ===
In 2019, the company began reconstruction of the M3 highway "Chișinău–Giurgiulești" in Moldova on sections with a total length of 85 km (53 mi), financed by the European Bank for Reconstruction and Development (EBRD). The first part was completed in 2022, the second in 2023, and the project included the repair of 11 bridges and related infrastructure. To implement the project, "Avtomagistral-Pivden" established a production base in the city of Vulcănești, which houses an asphalt concrete plant and a soil-mixing facility.

In 2023, the company began construction of an 8.5-kilometre (5.3 mi) bypass around the city of Vulcănești, which is part of the M3 route "Chișinău–Comrat–Giurgiulești–border with Romania".

In 2023–2024, "Avtomagistral-Pivden" carried out the reconstruction of the runway at Satu Mare Airport in Romania, and in 2025 completed the repair of a 21-kilometre (13 mi) section of road in Transylvania that connects the towns of Odorheiu Secuiesc and Cristuru Secuiesc and serves as an important tourist route.

In May 2025, "Avtomagistral-Pivden," together with the Romanian company Precon Transilvania, signed a contract for the construction of the first section of the Arad–Oradea motorway, with a total value of €460 million. The contract provides for the construction of the first 33.7-kilometre (20.9 mi) section of the road within the strategic European corridor Via Carpathia (which will connect the Baltic, Black, and Mediterranean seas), the construction of 32 infrastructure facilities (bridges, overpasses, interchanges), a 727-metre (2,385 ft) overpass over a railway, and the installation of parking areas with electric charging stations.

In August 2025, the company signed a contract for the reconstruction of the R34 road in Moldova on a 43-kilometre (27 mi) section between the cities of Cantemir and Cahul, financed by the EBRD, which provides for widening the road, complete pavement reconstruction, construction of six bridges, and other infrastructure.

=== Fortification construction ===
In late 2024, Automagistral-Pivden began constructing defensive lines along the Donetsk border, involving modular metal fortifications, trenches, and command posts. The company deployed over 150 units of equipment and 500 workers. By mid-2025, more than 350 reinforced concrete structures and 13 km of covered communication tunnels were completed. Two employees were killed and several injured during these operations.

=== Financial performance ===
Automagistral-Pivden has consistently won large Ukravtodor tenders within the "Great Construction" program. In 2020, together with other members of the National Association of Road Builders of Ukraine, it won over 75% of tenders under new rules reportedly lobbied by then Ukravtodor head Oleksandr Kubrakov and Yurii Holyk. That year, the company secured ₴30.3 billion in contracts, accounting for 31% of all road tenders.

== Criticism ==
In 2022, Stopkor reported a conflict over the construction works of Avtomahistral-Pivden in Hostomel, which representatives of another company (Vitruvia LLC) described as an attempt at a raider seizure of the site. In response, Avtomahistral-Pivden stated that the works were carried out on behalf of the local military administration as part of a project to build a modular town for internally displaced persons.

=== Construction of the water pipeline for Kryvyi Rih ===
In June 2023, three days after the destruction of the Kakhovka Hydroelectric Power Plant, Avtomahistral-Pivden began the construction of a new main water pipeline "Inhulets — Southern Reservoir" to supply water to Kryvyi Rih. The pipeline, over 26 km (16 mi) long, connects the Southern Reservoir with the Inhulets River and is capable of providing water to about 600,000 people. The first line of the pipeline was commissioned in August 2023, and the full completion of works took place in May 2024. In May 2024, Avtomahistral-Pivden completed the pipeline, ensuring the delivery of 400,000 cubic meters of water to the Southern Reservoir.

The journalists from Nashi Hroshi, having analyzed the contracts and prices published in the Prozorro system, concluded that the materials specified in the contracts were purchased at the level of average market prices. Media outlets and state institutions noted that the documentation of all three sections underwent an audit commissioned by the USAID agency, which confirmed that the cost estimates matched market prices, and each section involved consulting engineers and representatives of independent technical supervision.

Representatives of Avtomahistral-Pivden denied the accusations. In a column published in Ekonomichna Pravda, the company’s deputy director stated that the Recovery Agency had engaged a consulting engineer who determined the approximate project cost and held a tender in which several of the largest Ukrainian companies participated, and Avtomahistral-Pivden’s offer was the lowest. The contract provided for a fixed "turnkey" price with all risks borne by the contractor, and the approved rates were based on the customer’s market monitoring data. The company also emphasized that the facility was put into operation in less than a year (with a standard design and construction period of up to five years), the works were carried out in two shifts without weekends, and part of the works was financed with the company’s own funds due to delays in state financing.

== See also ==
- Great Construction
- Ukravtodor
