= Volodymyr Orlov =

Ukrainian politician, civil servant and scientist-economist

- Володимир Орлов
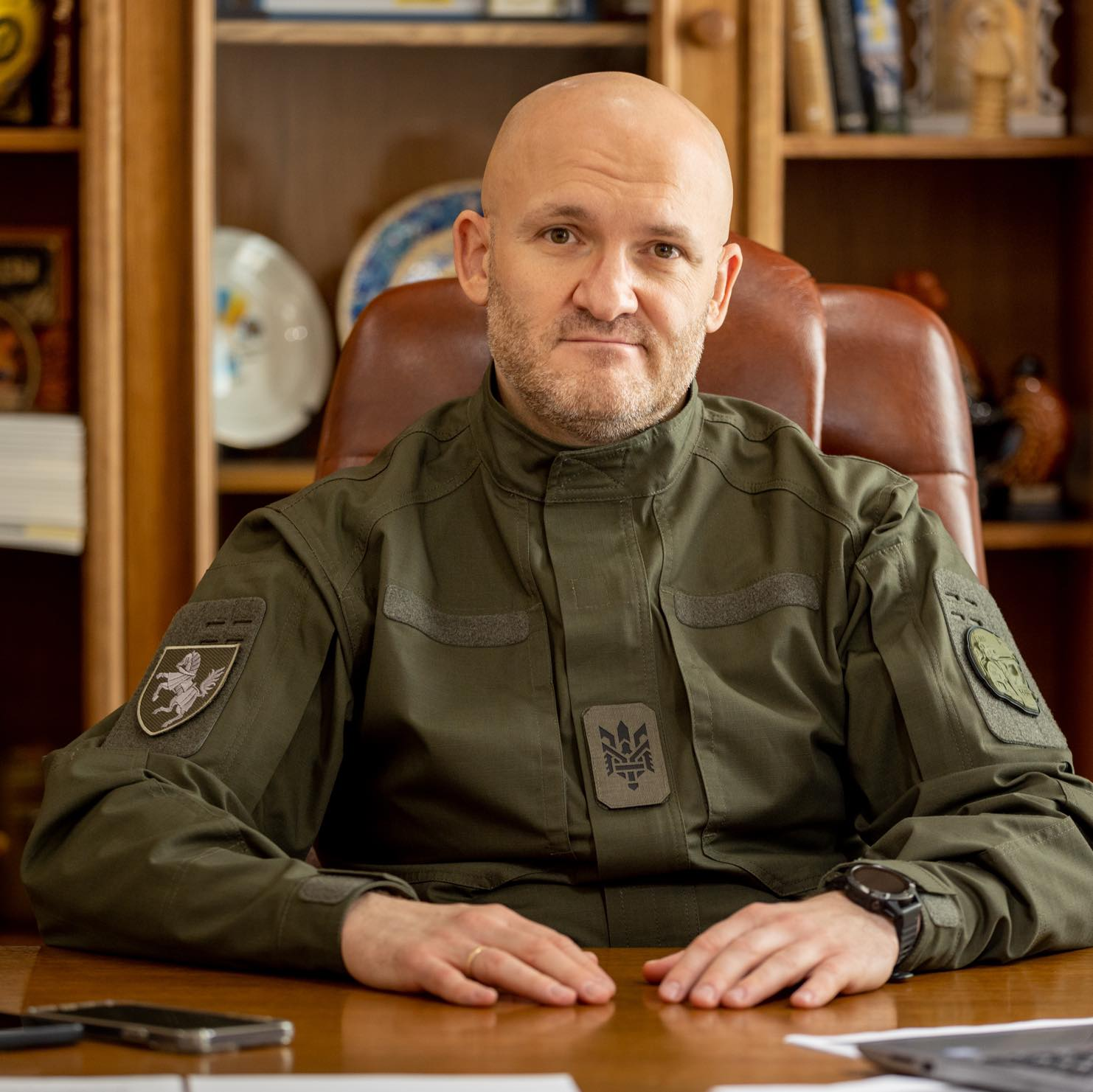

Governor of Dnipropetrovsk Oblast (acting)
- In office 24 January 2023 – 7 February 2023
- President: Volodymyr Zelenskyy
- Preceded by: Valentyn Reznichenko
- Succeeded by: Serhiy Lysak

Personal details
- Born: Volodymyr Volodymyrovych Orlov; 6 January 1980 (age 46) Donetsk, Ukrainian SSR, Soviet Union

Volodymyr Volodymyrovych Orlov (Ukrainian: Володимир Володимирович Орлов; born 6 January 1980) is a Ukrainian politician, civil servant and scientist-economist, who served as the acting Governor of Dnipropetrovsk Oblast in 2023. He is a Doctor of Economics, Honored Economist of Ukraine.

== Biography ==
Volodymyr Orlov was born in Dontesk on 6 January 1980.

Orlov has three full higher education. In 2002, he graduated from Donetsk National University of Economics and Trade named after Mikhail Tugan-Baranovsky, specialty "Management of the Organization", and in 2006, at the Donetsk Law Institute of Luhansk State University of Internal Jurisprudence. He began his work in October 2002 with the position of senior controller-revision of the control department in the field of ATP of the SCRSU Control and Audit Office in Donetsk region.

In November 2002 he was admitted to the post of ordinary inspector of the cargo department of the Donbas Regional Customs. In this customs authority, he went to the head of the customs clearance department.

In January 2010 he received the position of Head of the Customs Clearance Department of Berdyansk Customs. In May 2010, he was transferred to the Crimean customs to the post of deputy chief of the customs post "Krasnopepeksk" - the head of the customs clearance department.

From July 2010 to December 2012 he headed the Sumy Customs. From December 2012 to April 2013, he was the head of the Luhansk Customs.

In 2014, he graduated from the National University "Yaroslav the Wise Law Academy of Ukraine" with a degree in Law and received a master's degree in law.

In April 2014, he became the Deputy Head of the Department of Human Rights Activities and Combating Corruption and Crime in the Field of Transport of the Prosecutor's Office of Kyiv. And in July 2014 - Head of Department, Deputy Head of the Main Directorate of the Prosecutor General's Office of Ukraine.

In 2018, he passed a qualification exam in accordance with the Law of Ukraine "On Advocacy and Advocacy" and received a certificate of the right to take law.

From December 2019 to January 2021, he headed the Southeastern Interregional Territorial Administration of the ARMA in Dnipro.

Since January 2021, Orlov is the first deputy chairman of the Dnipropetrovsk Regional State Administration - Head of the Regional Military Administration.

On 23 January 2023, Orlov became the acting Governor of Dnipropetrovsk Oblast.

On 7 February 2023, he was replaced by his successor Serhiy Lysak.

Volodymyr Orlov, who until recently held the position of the first deputy chairman of the Dnipropetrovsk Regional Military Administration, filed an annual declaration for 2024. The expostine, which is accused of bribery, declared UAH 14.5 million in cash.

On 14 April 2025, Orlov, who has been accused of bribery, has declared 14.5 million hryvnias.

== Family ==
He is registered and resides in Kyiv.

He is married to his wife, Lina Oleksandrivna, and as two children, daughter Yelyzabeta, and son Volodymyr, whom they all live in Kyiv.
