= Great Construction =

Ukrainian infrastructure programme

- Велике будівництво (Ukrainian)

Government program overview
- Formed: March 2020
- Jurisdiction: Ukraine
- Status: Active
- Headquarters: Kyiv, Ukraine
- Annual budget: Over ₴100 billion annually (approximation)
- Coordinator responsible: Yuriy Holyk, Program Coordinator
- Parent Government program: Cabinet of Ministers of Ukraine

The Great Construction (Ukrainian: Велике будівництво, romanized: Velyke Budivnytstvo) is a government program in Ukraine initiated by President Volodymyr Zelenskyy in March 2020, aimed at developing the country’s transport, educational, social, and sports infrastructure.

The program has received criticism due to allegations of inefficient budget use as well as corruption, which has been the subject of multiple media and official investigations.

== History ==
The program was initiated by the President of Ukraine, Volodymyr Zelenskyy, in March 2020, and its implementation began under the Ministry for Communities and Territories Development. The program involves the reconstruction and construction of schools, kindergartens, and sports infrastructure. In 2020, it was planned to complete 10 long-term construction projects. Throughout 2020, 150 km of roads leading to international border checkpoints were repaired, and 216 bridges were built or renovated.

The program was launched amid the COVID-19 pandemic in Ukraine coronavirus pandemic and, according to Volodymyr Zelenskyy, created 200,000 jobs.

The Office of the President of Ukraine and local authorities promoted themselves through the program. Advertising signs were installed at construction sites, and several Ukrainian politicians used the "Great Construction" branding on their social media profiles. The ruling party, Servant of the People, promoted itself by leveraging the Great Construction program ahead of the 2020 local elections.

== Role of Yuriy Holyk ==
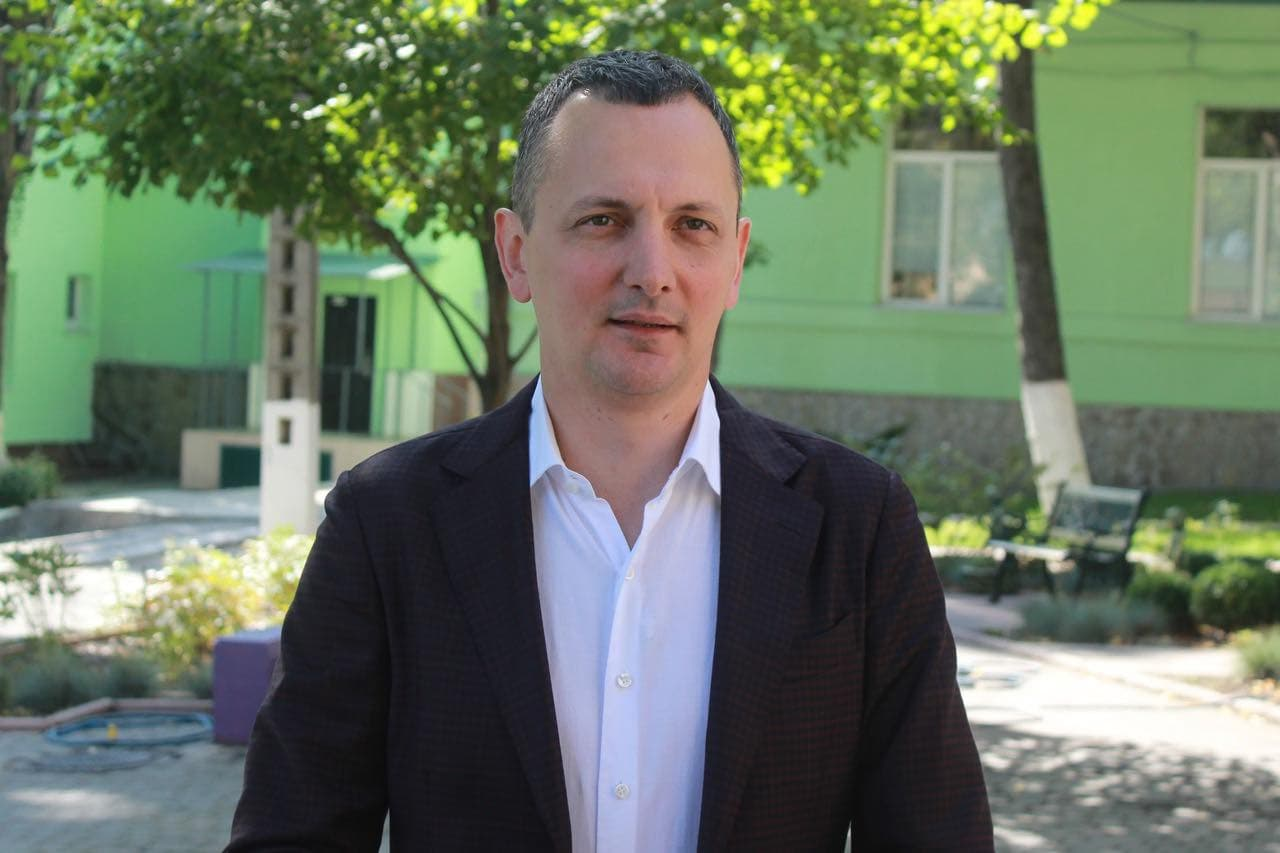
Yuriy Holyk, the coordinator of the Great Construction program

Yuriy Holyk, the coordinator of the Great Construction program, played a key role in its implementation. Holyk is a former advisor to Valentyn Reznichenko, the head of the Dnipropetrovsk Regional State Administration. He coordinated the program’s information support and participated in the allocation of contracts. However, his involvement in the project was marred by numerous corruption scandals and investigative reports.

In 2022, investigative journalists reported that Budinvest Engineering, a company co-owned by Reznichenko’s close friend, received billion-hryvnia contracts for road repairs under the program. Following these reports, the National Anti-Corruption Bureau of Ukraine (NABU) conducted searches of Holyk’s properties in connection with suspicions of corruption schemes. Investigators also discovered text messages on Holyk’s phone with a contractor who had received over 4 billion UAH in state contracts. These messages revealed coordination of actions between Holyk and the contractor, including discussions about obtaining subsidies and the progress of construction work.

== Criticism ==
The Great Construction program has faced criticism from journalists as a media-driven PR campaign for President Volodymyr Zelenskyy, due to the absence of any official government document listing the projects or the conditions for participation in the program. Additionally, many of the Great Construction projects were actually completed before the program officially started, but were reopened under the branding of the government initiative.

During 2020, approximately 4,000 km of roads were built within the framework of the Great Construction program at a cost of 120 billion UAH. However, in 2018, 3,800 km of roads were built for 40 billion UAH, meaning the construction costs have tripled. Due to this, the program has sometimes been nicknamed the Great Theft (Velyke Kradivnytstvo). In 2020, law enforcement agencies identified 429 criminal offenses related to works carried out under the Great Construction program.

Critics also point to allegations of cartel collusion, as six companies won a large share of the tenders, holding about 67% of all orders from the Ukravtodor in 2020. One of the program’s critics was Ihor Umanskyi, advisor to the head of the President’s Office and former Minister of Finance of Ukraine, who spoke about cartel misuse of funds allocated for road construction, which were originally transferred from the COVID-19 response fund.

== Assessments ==
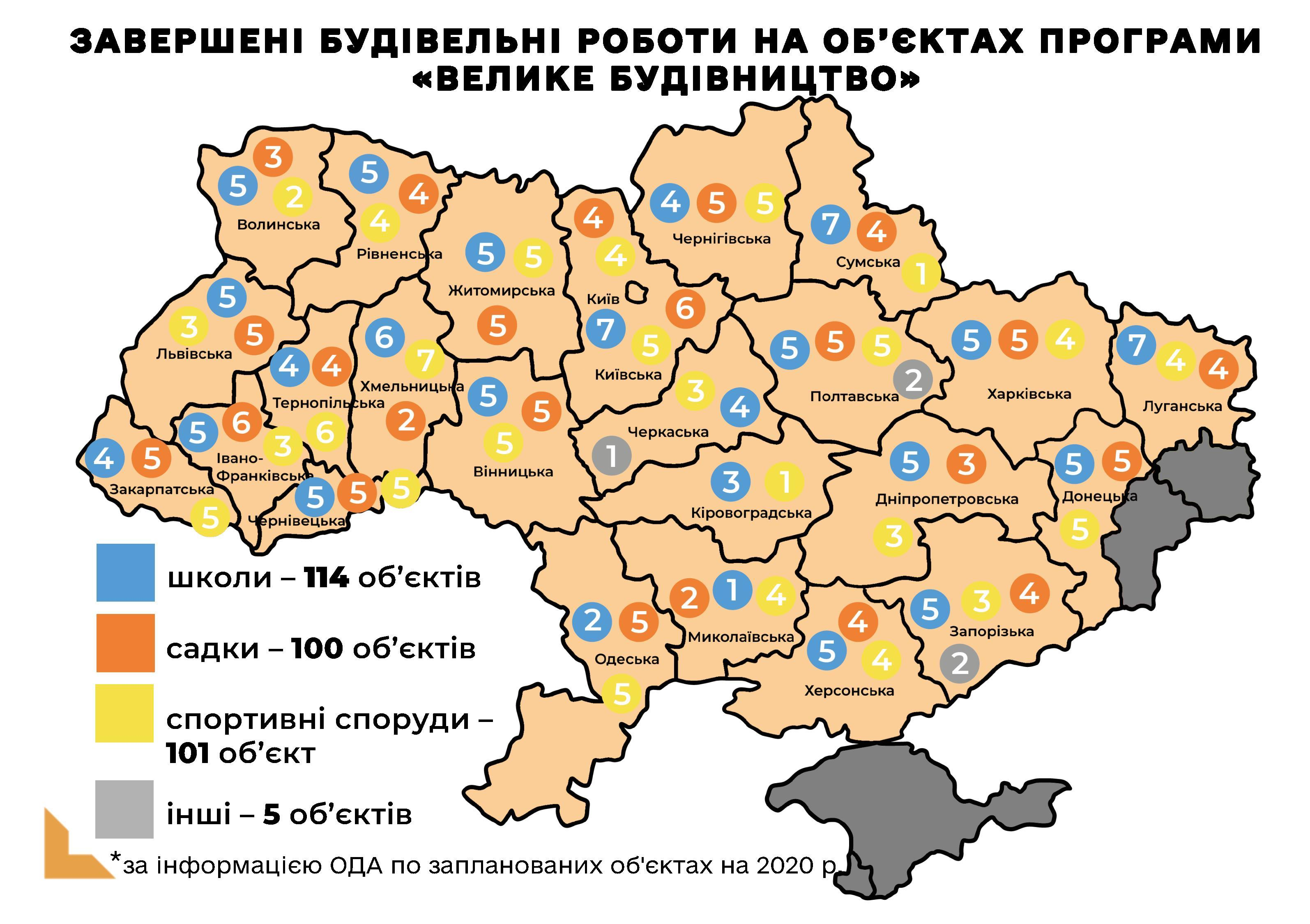
Facilities completed as part of the Great Construction program in 2020

In 2022–2023, the program came under increased scrutiny for allocating resources to infrastructure projects while the threat of a full-scale Russian invasion of Ukraine loomed larger. Experts and civil society activists argued that substantial funds could have been redirected to bolster Ukraine’s defense capabilities and that some of the Great Construction expenditures were inefficient under martial law.

According to a survey by the Razumkov Centre conducted just before the invasion, 57.1% of respondents considered funding the Armed Forces of Ukraine to be a higher priority than implementing the Great Construction program.

== Funding during the war ==
In August 2022, investigative journalists reported that despite the full-scale Russian invasion of Ukraine, the government continued to finance road projects without using the Prozorro procurement system. The largest payments were received by Budinvest Engineering, a company linked to the Dnipropetrovsk Regional State Administration and the coordinator of the Great Construction program, Yuriy Holyk.

Contractor	Payment Amount (UAH)
Budinvest Engineering	1,034,611,599
Automagistral 2016	197,096,724
Automagistral-Pivden	172,305,506
Onur Construction International	139,916,647
Techno-Bud-Center	128,055,995
Kharkiv Oblavtodor	127,072,306
Khmelnytskyi Oblavtodor	104,453,079
Rostdorstroy	100,057,504
Spets Komplekt Postach	92,556,163
SUNP Avtostrada	75,866,659
PP Avtomagistral	75,257,214

== Gallery ==
Objects of the Great Construction program

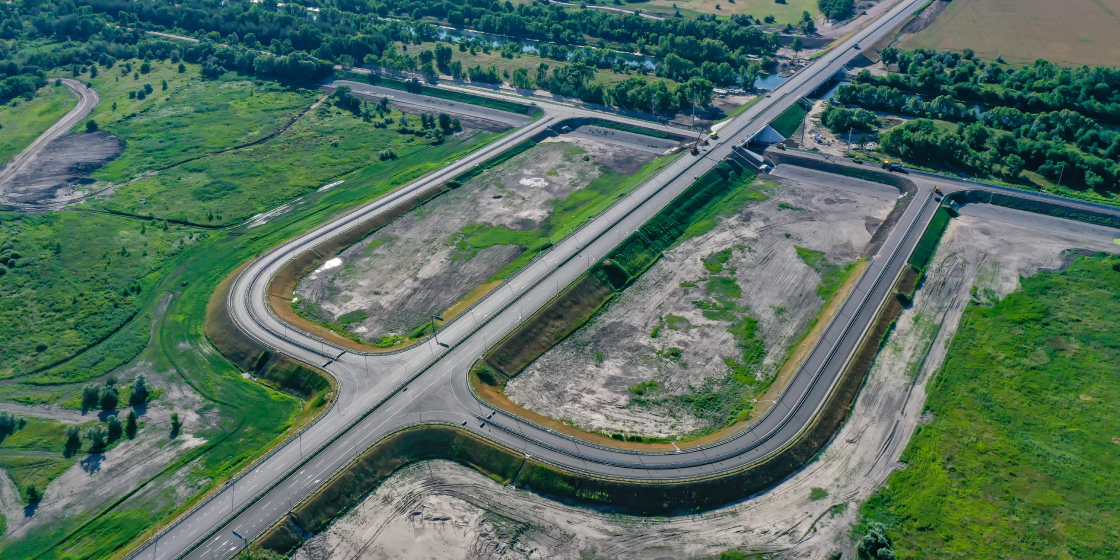
Zaporizhzhia — Mariupol highway

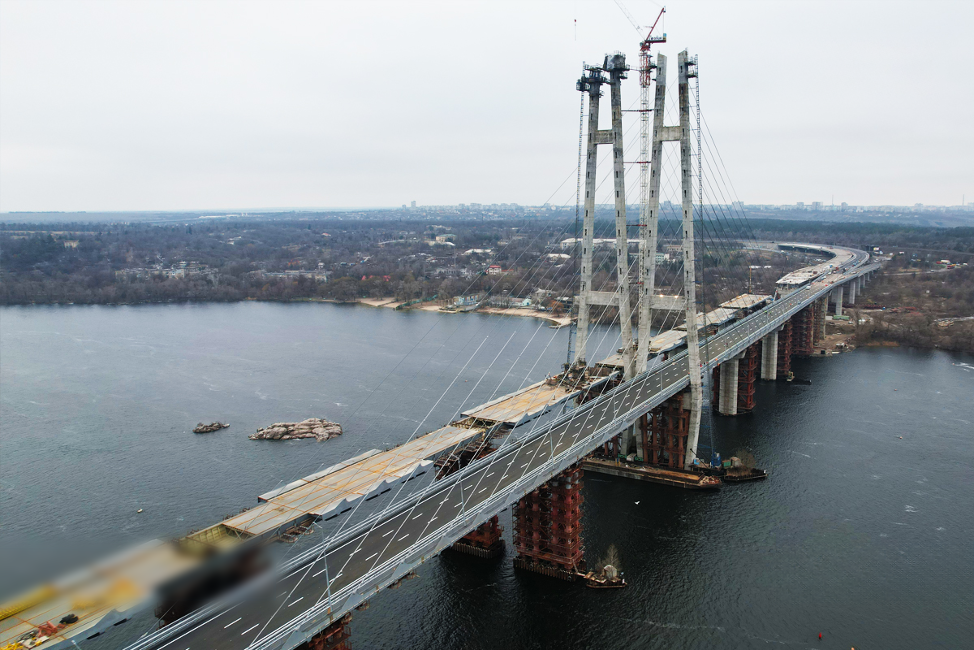
New Zaporizhzhia Dniper Bridge

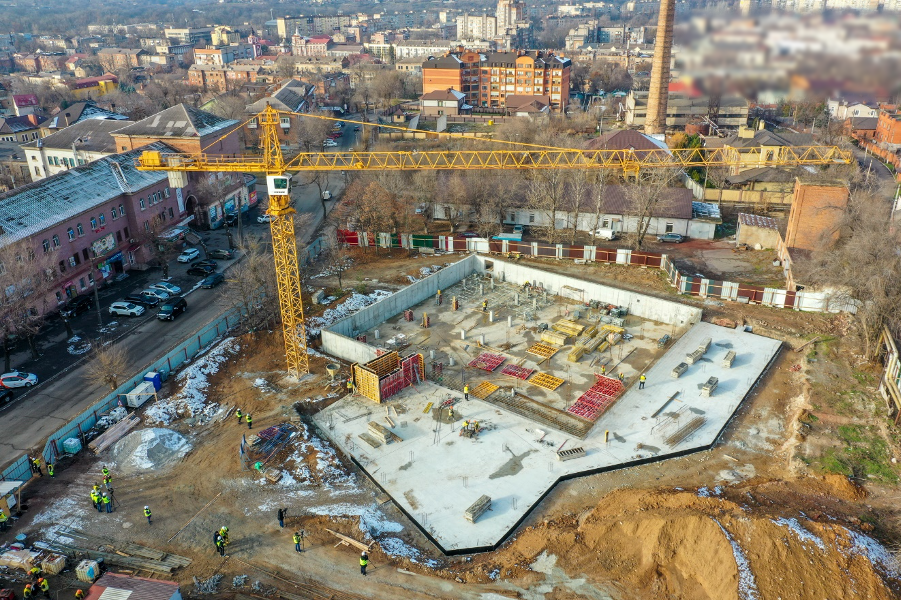
Construction of a swimming pool in Kryvyi Rih

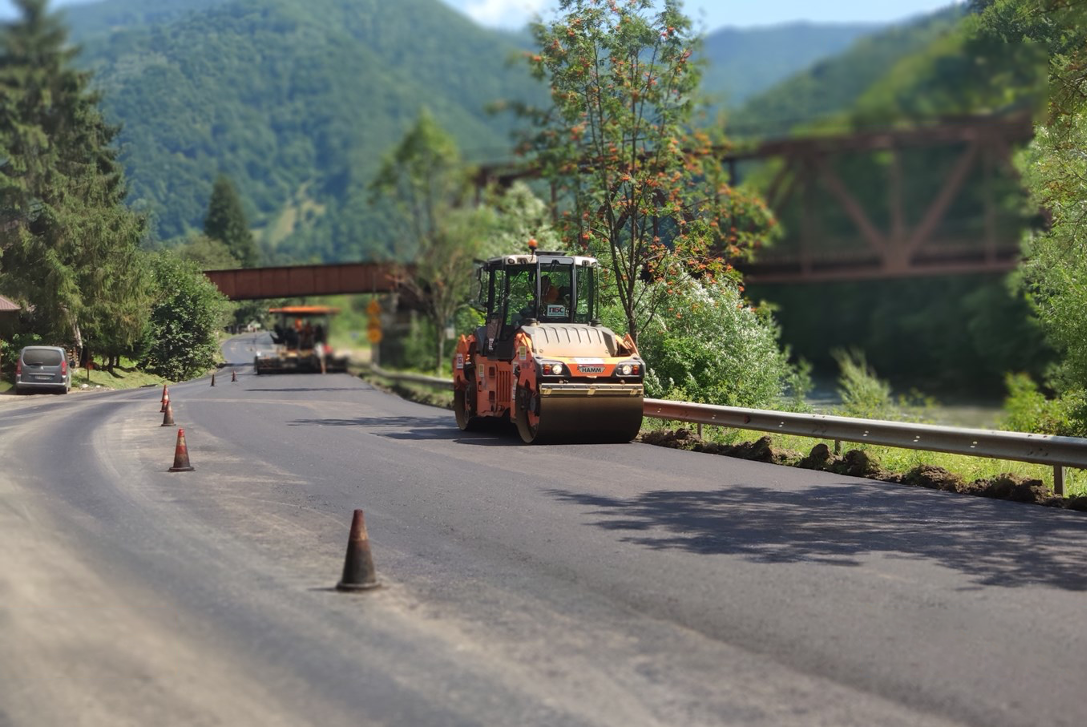
Road repair in Zakarpattia region

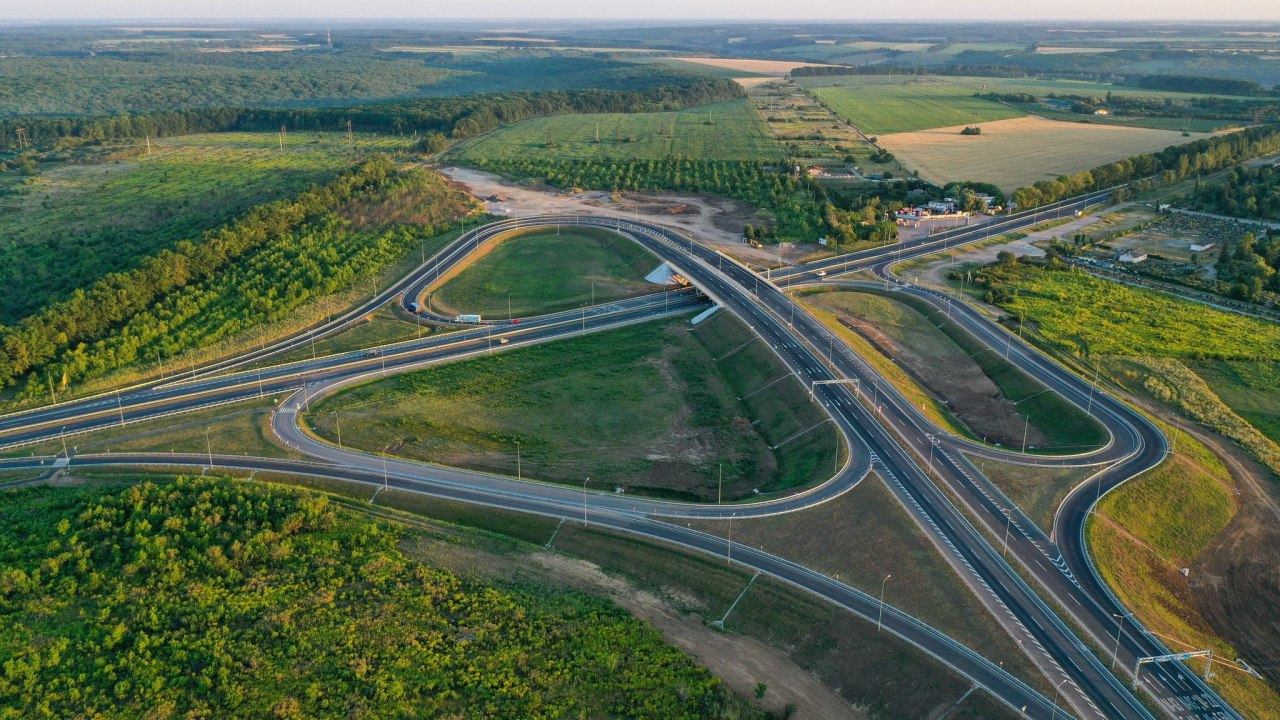
M03 route Kyiv — Kharkiv — Dovzhanskyi
