= Vladyslav Haivanenko =

Ukrainian politician and former police officer

- Владислав Гайваненко
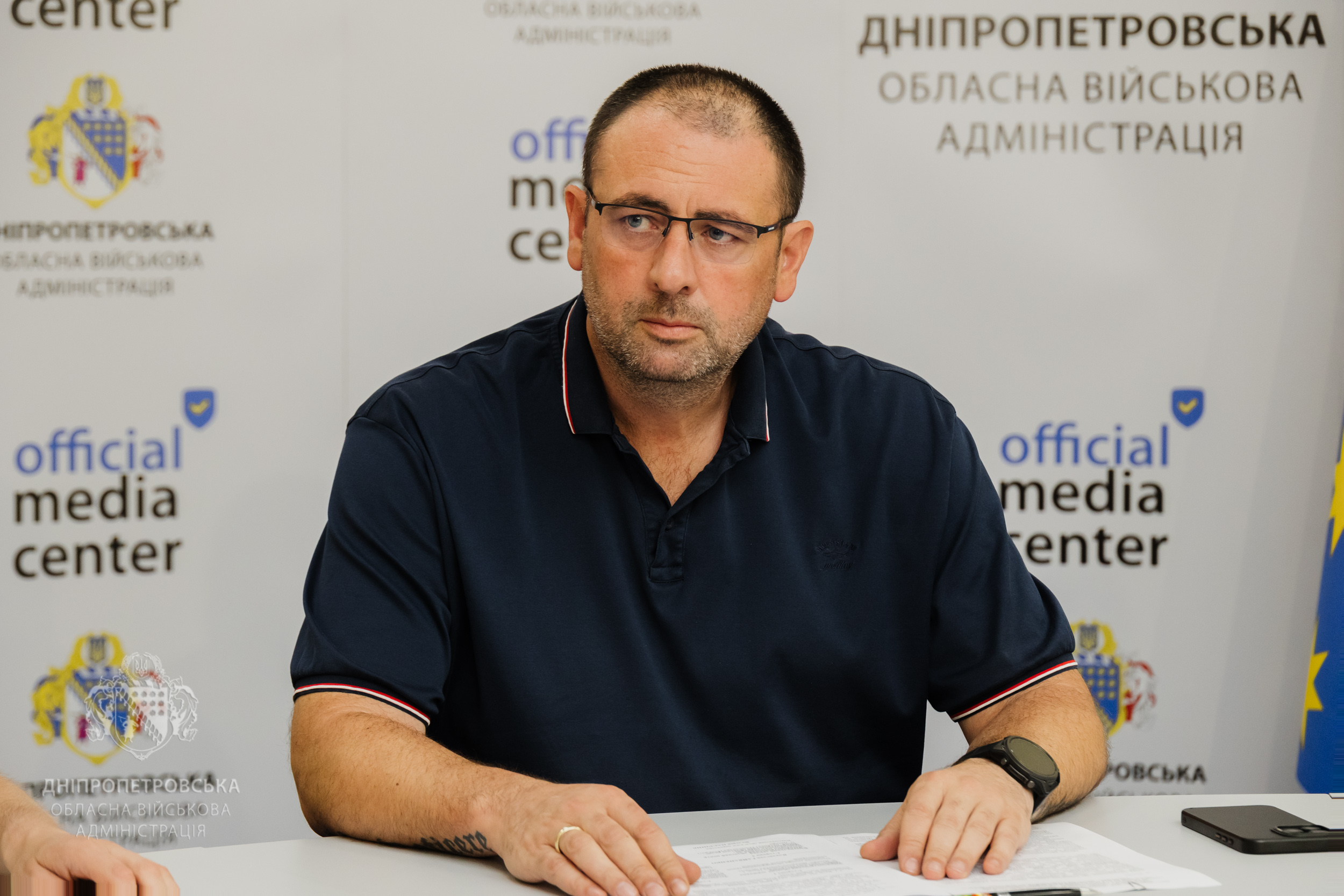
- Haivanenko in 2025

Governor of Dnipropetrovsk Oblast (acting)
- In office 15 October 2025 – 8 January 2026
- President: Volodymyr Zelenskyy
- Preceded by: Serhiy Lysak
- Succeeded by: Oleksandr Hanzha

Deputy Head of the Dnipropetrovsk Oblast State Administration
- In office February 2025 – January 2026

Personal details
- Born: Soviet Union

Vladyslav Viktorovych Haivanenko (Ukrainian: Владислав Вікторович Гайваненко) is a Ukrainian politician and former police officer who is currently the acting Governor of Dnipropetrovsk Oblast since 15 October 2025.

He had also been the deputy head of the Dnipropetrovsk Oblast State Administration.

== Biography ==
He has higher education, and has worked in law enforcement agencies.

Until 2012, he was the deputy chief of the Suvorovsky district police department of Odesa.

From 2012 to 2015, he was the head of the Kyiv district police department of Odesa. In 2015, he was dismissed from law enforcement agencies.

In 2016, he was a co-founder of the NGO "Association of Veterans of Law Enforcement Bodies of Odesa".

From 2017 to 2020, he was the founder and head of the Security Service security agency.

In February 2025, Vaivanekno became the deputy head of the Dnipropetrovsk Oblast State Administration. On 15 October, became the acting Governor of Dnipropetrovsk Oblast, and replaced Serhiy Lysak in this position.

== Personal life ==
According to Haivanenko's declaration for 2024, the registered place of residence is Odesa, and the actual place of residence is Dnipro.

He is married to his wife, Manuela, and has a daughter, Sofiya.
