= Oleksandr Bondarenko (economist) =

Ukrainian economist

- Олександр Бондаренко
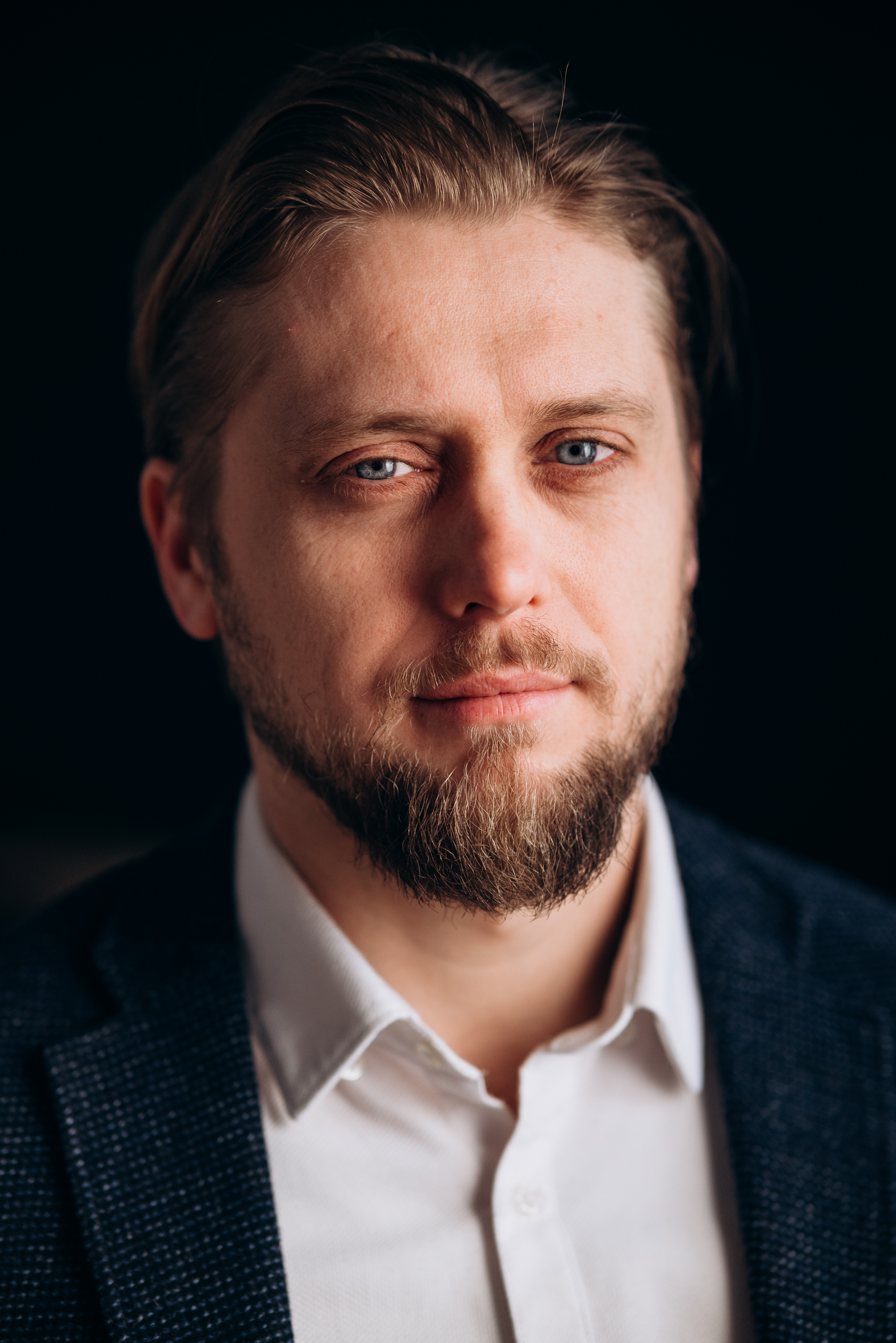
- Born: 22 January 1987 (age 38); Kharkiv
- Citizenship: Ukraine
- Occupations: Economist, Entrepreneur
- Known for: Co-founder of the Institute of Public Efficiency, Head and Founder of the Bureau of Investment Programs group of companies

Oleksandr Viktorovych Bondarenko (Ukrainian: Олександр Вікторович Бондаренко; born 22 January 1987) is a Ukrainian economist, businessman. He is a co-founder of the Institute for Public Efficiency a chairman and founder of the Bureau of Investment Programs, the management company of the NOVO Industrial Parks.

In 2019-2020, he was the head of the Governor of Dnipropetrovsk Oblast.

== Education ==
He graduated from the Kyiv-Mohyla Academy with a Bachelor's degree in Finance (with honors) in Economics and Entrepreneurship, followed by a Master's degree in Finance (with honors). He is currently completing a PhD program in Finance at his alma mater.

A graduate of the Kyiv-Mohyla Business School numerous executive programs, the DYB Ukraine program, and the IEDC Bled School of Management.

He participated an internship in Sweden as part of the Strategic Business Management (SIDA) private sector development program for top managers and public sector leaders in European emerging countries.

Bondarenko is a graduate of the Strategic Marketing Executive Program at the Kellogg School of Management at Northwestern University in Chicago, US.

He took part in the US Aid Parliamentary Internship Program in the Ukrainian Parliament under the Finance and Banking Committee and completed the Young Leaders Exchange Program of the US-Ukraine Foundation in Washington D.C., US.

In October 2019, he took advanced training courses at the Ukrainian School of Government under the general short-term program "Organization of the activities of heads of regional state administrations in the context of reforms."

In October 2020 - finished his training at UCGA (Ukrainian Academy of Corporate Governance).

A graduate of the International Program of Public Administration at the University of Singapore - Lee Kuan Yew School of Public Policy.

He was trained at the Haas Business School accelerator for food businesses in Berkeley and presented the project at the NOVO industrial parks to Silicon Valley investors.

INSEAD alumni of Strategic Board Management Program together with Ukrainian Corporate Governance Academy, 2021.

Also Oleksandr is graduating from Carlson School of Management (University of Minnesota) with an Executive MBA degree in 2025.

== Career ==
Since 2021 – Director of Bureau of Investment Programs. The organization deals with investments support, development of renewable energy and public-private partnership

2007-2008 - Assistant Chairman of the Finance and Banking Committee of the Verkhovna Rada of Ukraine (USAID Parliamentary Internship Program), Kyiv.

For 12 years he worked in a number of manufacturing companies, held leading positions. Among them are the British-Dutch concern Unilever, the Ukrainian-Bulgarian manufacturer PIRANA and the VERDANI plant.

Since 2017, co-founder and manager of several companies in the field of food and retail.

He is also a member of the Advisory Board in a number of Ukrainian companies in the Consumer Goods industry.

In 2019-2020 - Head of the Dnipropetrovsk Regional State Administration.

From December 2020 - Member of the Dnipropetrovsk Oblast Council, member of the Budget Committee.

Oleksandr Bondarenko is a regular member of the working group of the Verkhovna Rada Committee on Economic Development and Development of Industrial Parks, and a member of the working group on the opening of the Mlynyshche-Slipce border crossing point. As part of this, he is engaged in developing green energy and attracting investors to energy projects within the framework of NOVO industrial parks.

He is a regular participant in international and national conferences, including CEE Property Forum 2023, Rebuilding Ukraine Roundtable in Warsaw, Agro-Food Panel in Toronto, Investment Forum in Washington, D.C., Update in Ukraine: Rebuilding and integration, Ukraine Recovery Conference - URC2024, a program of the German Ministry of Economy, BUSINESS FRANCE forum, Europe-Poland-Ukraine conference: Cooperate Together'24, participant of Davos.Didgital-2025 panel Community and Inclusion: Building the Next WebDate/Time. Member of the European Economic Association.

=== Head of the Dnipropetrovsk Regional State Administration ===
September 13, 2019 - appointed head of the Dnipropetrovsk Regional State Administration.

On December 17, 2019, Oleksandr Bondarenko presented the program of the region's development strategy. The main areas identified were airport construction, investment attraction, environmental programs to reduce air emissions, as well as repaired roads, schools, kindergartens and hospitals, SMART projects, the Euro- and Euro-Atlantic integration program and founding of new regional territorial communities. The presentation gathered more than 600 guests - leaders of communities and cities of the region, public activists, business representatives.

On September 16, 2020, construction of a new, modern airport in Dnipro began.

On November 30, 2020, the Office for European Integration of Dnipropetrovsk Region was inaugurated on the basis of Dnipropetrovsk Regional State Administration with the participation of Deputy Prime Minister for European and Euro-Atlantic Integration of Ukraine Olha Stefanishyna and Head of the Delegation of the European Union to Ukraine Matti Maasikas.

In 2020, within the framework of the regional project Construction 100+ under the leadership of Oleksandr Bondarenko, more than 70 facilities were completed - 17 schools, 5 small group houses, 22 ambulatories, 13 reception departments, 8 hospitals were repaired and 40 km of new water pipes were built.

The largest sports arena in the region, the Olympic Reserves, has been opened, along with Minister of Youth and Sports Vadim Gutzeit. The complex can host championships in 40 sports. This is the first sports complex in Ukraine of this level, where you can hold world championships, European championships and various international competitions.

Also on the initiative of O. Bondarenko, the project Comfort Territory was successfully implemented - 11 new parks and squares in the region and the first inclusive park for children in Kryvyi Rih.

4 bridges and 320 km of roads were repaired, in particular the highways Vilne - Hvardiiske, Ivanivka - Radisne, Vasylkivka - Mykolayivka, Prosyana - Velykomykhailivka.

In 2020, on the initiative of O. Bondarenko, within the framework of the program With Respect to Soldiers in Dnipropetrovsk region, the purchase of 67 apartments for participants of the anti-terrorist operation in the east of Ukraine was financed by regional and state funds.

In the 2020 Ukrainian local elections, he ran for the seventh constituency of the Dnipropetrovsk Oblast Council. He won the constituency, becoming a deputy of the council and a member of the budget commission.

On December 10, 2020, he resigned from the position of the head of the Dnipropetrovsk Regional State Administration, and was replaced by Valentyn Reznichenko.

== Public and educational activities ==
Bondarenko is a member of the Board of the Association of Alumni of the Kyiv-Mohyla Academy. He initiated and founded the 'Inheritance of Scientific Activity' grant, awarded to the best lecturer and graduate of the Faculty of Economic Sciences at KMA. Together with his classmates from the Faculty of Economics, he established the Fund for Scientific Publications and Business Trips to support students and faculty members.

He is the founder and head of the NGO "Association for Economic Development" - a platform that develops and implements programs of regional and national economic development, analysis and scientific aspects of the economy.

Bondarenko is also a member of the Board of Trustees and a member of the Advisory Board of The Kharkiv University of Humanities' "People's Ukrainian Academy".

In November 2019, he initiated a project of complete reconstruction of the Leonid Kogan Philharmonic Hall Dnipro.

Oleksandr Bondarenko is a big supporter of the Invictus Games Ukraine national team, which are designed to provide new opportunities for servicemen and veterans who have paid a high price for their devotion to their country and its people. He organized sports parachute jumps for the participants of anti-terrorist operation and people with disabilities.

In the summer of 2024, the Investment Programs Bureau team led by Oleksandr Bondarenko implemented an educational project for entrepreneurs from Chuhuiv and Chkalovsk communities in Kharkiv Oblast and representatives of local authorities.

In July of the same year, he implemented a series of workshops on the Green Economy in cooperation with the European-Ukrainian Hub for Ukrainians in Denmark.

In October, he initiated and created a new educational platform for universities, business schools and corporate academies - ECOPRO.Academy.

== Publications ==
- Government appoints new head of Dnipropetrovsk Regional State Administration
- "President introduced new Dnipropetrovsk RSA Head Oleksandr Bondarenko". Office of the President of Ukraine. September 14, 2019.
- Oleksandr Bondarenko Slovo i Dilo
- We need plants: where to start
- What are the plants for in Ukraine
- How much will it cost to a private investor to enter the Ukrainian space industry?
- How much investments are needed to create an industrial park and when the profit is expected
- Oleksandr Bondarenko «On construction of the new airport in Dnipro»
- Investment guide around the Dnipropetrovsk region

== Awards ==
- Stipend of the Verkhovna Rada of Ukraine.
- Fellow of the Ivan Puluj Foundation.
- Fellow of the Raiffeisen Bank Aval Foundation.
- Winner of all-Ukrainian business plan competitions.
- The best student of the Faculty of Economic Sciences of KMA 2006, the Star of the Faculty.
