= Municipal Guard (Odesa) =

Military unit

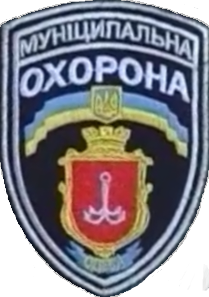

Agency overview
- Formed: 14 December 2015
- Dissolved: 30 October 2025
- Employees: 200–300

Jurisdictional structure
- Operations jurisdiction: Ukraine
- Legal jurisdiction: Odesa

Operational structure
- Agency executive: Volodymyr Vasyliovich Kolchyk, Director
- Parent agency: Odesa City Council

Website
- omr.gov.ua/ua/departments/64972

The Odesa Municipal Guard, also known as the Public Formation for the Protection of Public Order, was a municipal militia in Odesa established in 2015, originally under the name of the "Municipal Guard". The stated purpose of this agency the protection of property of the territorial community of Odesa and prevention of crime in the city. The agency is led by Kolchik Vladimir Vasilyevich. and is currently part of the Department of Public Safety established by the Odesa City Council on August 27, 2014.

According to Mayor Gennadiy Trukhanov, the enterprise received a first-level security license from the Ministry of Internal Affairs of Ukraine. By April 2017, the agency was reported to employ more than 100 people.

In July 2018, Odesa City Councillor Olga Kvasnitsky reported that the agency employed approximately 300 people.

The Municipal Guard was liquidated on 30 October 2025, in one of the first actions of Serhiy Lysak as head of Odessa's city military administration.

== History ==
=== Attempts to establish a municipal militia ===
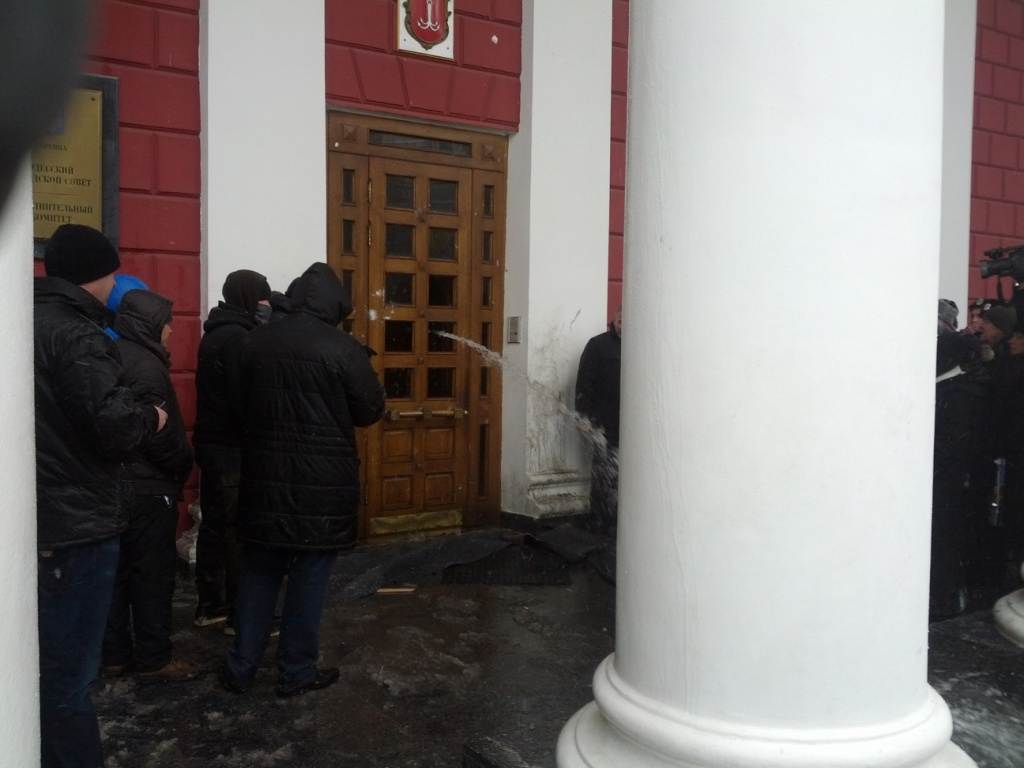
The guard of the Odesa City Council waters protesters of the All-Ukrainian association "Svoboda" on December 21, 2012

The first attempts to establish a municipal guard in Odesa began in 2007. Odesa Mayor Eduard Gurwits announced the plans for establishment of a municipal militia force to guard the law and order in the city with a personnel of 1,000 people, which is going to fight against domestic crime.

Afterwards, the leadership of the Ministry of Internal Affairs of Ukraine in the context of the opposition between the mayor of Odesa Eduard Gurwitz and the chairman of the regional council Ruslan Bodelan opposed the establishment of "illegal military formations," instead of the municipal militia in 2008 there were "Municipal Squadrons" formed which consisted of 50 people who did not play a specific role in managing the lawful order in the city.

In 2008 a working group led by Doctor of Law Mikhail Baymuratov created a draft project – the charter of the territorial bulk of Odesa, which was supposed to establish the municipal militia. However, the project was not adopted, and the status of the municipal militia was not regulated in the legislation of Ukraine. In 2012 with the goal of protecting Odesa City Council instead of the state security service there were private security firms used of Odesa Mayor Alexei Kostusev.

=== Department of the Municipal Guard ===
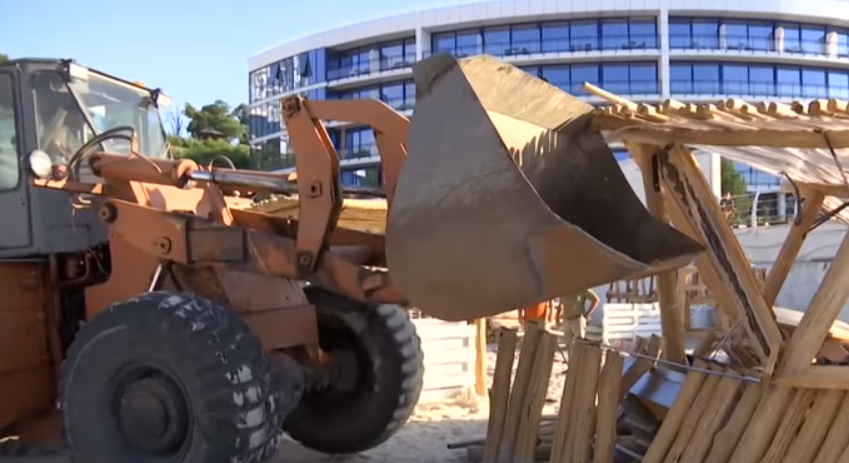
The Department of the Municipal Security with the participation of the municipal institution "Gorodskaya Strazha" dismantles pavilions on the beach

On August 27, 2014 the Department of Municipal Guard of the Odesa City Council was established.

This structure assumed the functions of a disbanded environmental militia, the city inspection for the improvement, the management of advertising and trade and of the legal department. The Department coordinated activities of private security agencies involved in "protecting public order".

Among these structures the security company "Gepard" and the public organization "Narodnaya Strazha" were related to the mayor of Odesa Gennadiy Trukhanov and the chairman of Odesa Regional State Administration Igor Palitsa.

"Gepard" and "Narodnaya Strazha" were seen in a number of incidents, including the attack on Odesa activists during protests against deforestation and the construction of a parking lot on the Health Route, former members of Rodina and Antimaidan parties were seen among the attackers.

On June 16, 2014 representatives of the security company "Gepard" fought with participants in protest actions near the Russian consulate in Odesa in the view of the shot down IL-76 in Luhansk. As a result of the conflict activists had suffered. "Gepard" also participated in an armed confrontation around the Odesa oil refinery. As the director of the Department of the Municipal Guard in April 2017 was appointed Viktor Kuznetsov, who served as the head of the traffic militia in Odesa during the presidency of Yanukovych and was noticed in a number of corruption scandals.

=== The Municipal Guard ===
On April 16, 2015 the decision was taken to establish a municipal enterprise of the Odesa City Council "The Municipal Guard". The newly established enterprise includes former members of security companies "Gepard" and "Narodnaya Strazha".

In March 2016 municipal enterprise "The Municipal Guard" received the first level license for security activities of the Ministry of Internal Affairs and received the right to carry special means (gas cartridges, rubber batons), to patrol the streets, to protect administrative buildings and ensure the security of administrative buildings and individuals. Other functions of the Municipal Guard include the promotion of the protection and maintenance of public order during mass events, as well as the control over trade, dismantling and installation of small architectural forms, implementation of rules for development, repair of buildings and sidewalks, dismantling of uniparkers, fight against illegal seizures of land, control of passage of vehicles on the Health Route.

The municipal enterprise "The Municipal Guard" took over the functions of guarding the Odesa City Council, as well as the district councils of Odesa, after which the admission of social activists and journalists to the city council was restricted. On the fact of non-admission of journalists on June 14, 2017 to the session of the Odesa City Council criminal proceedings were initiated.

On December 14, 2017 at the session of the Odesa City Council, a decision was taken to reorganize the municipal enterprise "The Municipal Guard" into the municipal institution "Municipal Watch".

The necessity for reorganization was justified by the fact that the municipal enterprise was not engaged in the activities related to making a profit, therefore it was reorganized into a municipal institution.

On April 25, 2018, the Odesa City Council decided to allocate an additional ₴26 million to increase wages to employees of the municipal enterprise "Municipal Guard", the purchase of ammunition, clothing and other needs. Director of the Department of Municipal Guard Viktor Kuznetsov justified the need to increase the number of employees of the "Municipal Guard" from 100 to 200 people.

The Municipal Guard was liquidated on 30 October 2025.

== Scandals ==
=== Attacks against activists ===
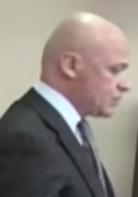
The trial of Gennadiy Trukhanov, February 2018

Journalists have repeatedly called the institution a "personal army of Trukhanov", they reported about obstruction of journalistic activities and beatings. The public activist Vladislav Balinsky reported that on April 10, 2015 during the flashmob he was forcefully withdrawn by five members of the Municipal Guard to a room in the City Council, which had no CCTV cameras, and beaten. The case is listed in the Unified Register of Pre-trial Investigations. In the summer and early autumn of 2017, the municipal guard took part several times in the dispersal of indefinite actions against Mayor Trukhanov. More than a dozen of activists were beaten, later they were taken to hospitals with fractures. No sanctions were taken for the abuse of authority, only one employee of the municipal institution was fired.

On February 15, 2018 in Kyiv, while considering the measure of restraint to the mayor of Odesa, there were clashes between unknown men in black uniforms and activists of right-wing radical organizations "Natsdruzhina" and "C14". On the same day a representative of the deputy head of Odesa published a photo of 71 employees of the Municipal Guard on Dumskaya Square, claiming that the photo was taken at 17:45, and the charge that guard were involved in the Kyiv bouts is false. He stated that another 128 employees were absent at the disposition because of the employment on duty.

=== Dismantling in the territory of the "Pavlovs’ House" Gostiny Dvor ===
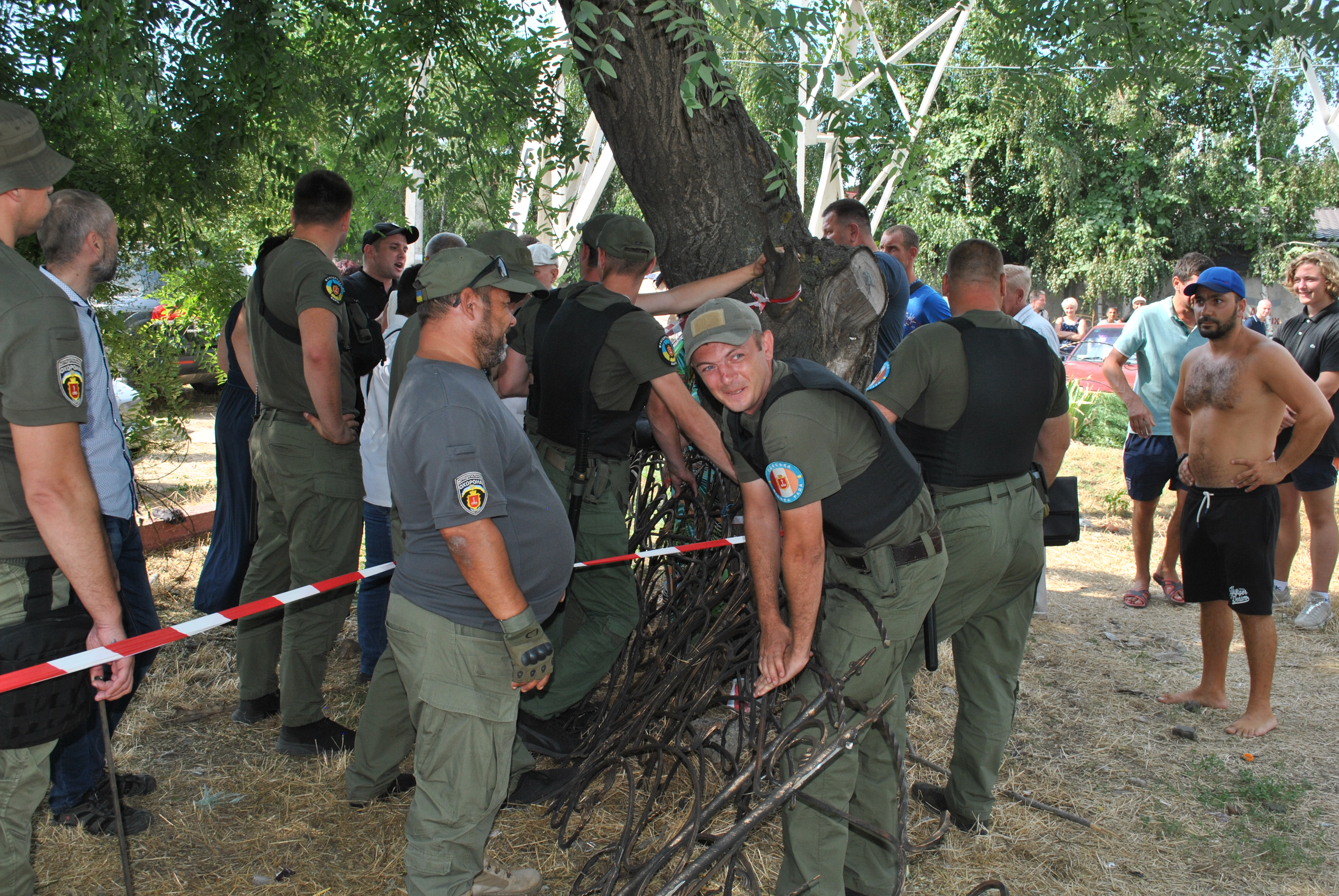
Odesa "Municipal Guard" dismantles the decorative fence on the territory of the "Pavlovs’ House" Gostiny Dvor

On July 10, 2018, the employees of the Municipal Guard dismantled the decorative fence in the territory of the guest yard "Pavlovs’ House". The actions of municipalities caused criticism from a legal viewpoint. Several vehicles of the public utility came to dismantle with about 80 people, some of them were armed with special means. Besides, a bulldozer was involved in the dismantling process. According to eyewitnesses, Yuriy Savchenko the first deputy head of the department of municipal security was among mentioned people. Neither he nor other employees of the Municipal Guard presented their IDs. Moreover, the above-mentioned individuals refused to show documents that would give them permission to carry out dismantling operations. On the other hand, the owners of the building showed documents certifying the legality of the building. Moreover, the day before the court forbade any kind of dismantling actions in the parking lot area on Veksler's lane, where the guest yard of the "Pavlovs’ House" is located.

The events of July 10 were preceded by amendments to the system of urban cadastre in Odesa. In the opinion of the attorney Stanislav Desyatnikov, not identified for that moment, an employee of LLC "Odesgeoservis" inserted deliberately false information to a tablet with geodesic tables, namely, aforementioned person erased from the map the fence of the "Pavlovs’ House". Upon the fact of the violation, the data were entered to the Unified Register of Pre-Trial Investigations with legal qualification – article 366 part 1 of the Criminal Code of Ukraine (forgery by an official).

Such type of the actions by the employees of the Department of Municipal Security and the Municipal Guard, according to the representatives of the "Pavlovs’ House", emphasize the tendency of violating one of the key rights of the Ukrainian democratic society, namely the property right.

=== Attack on journalists ===
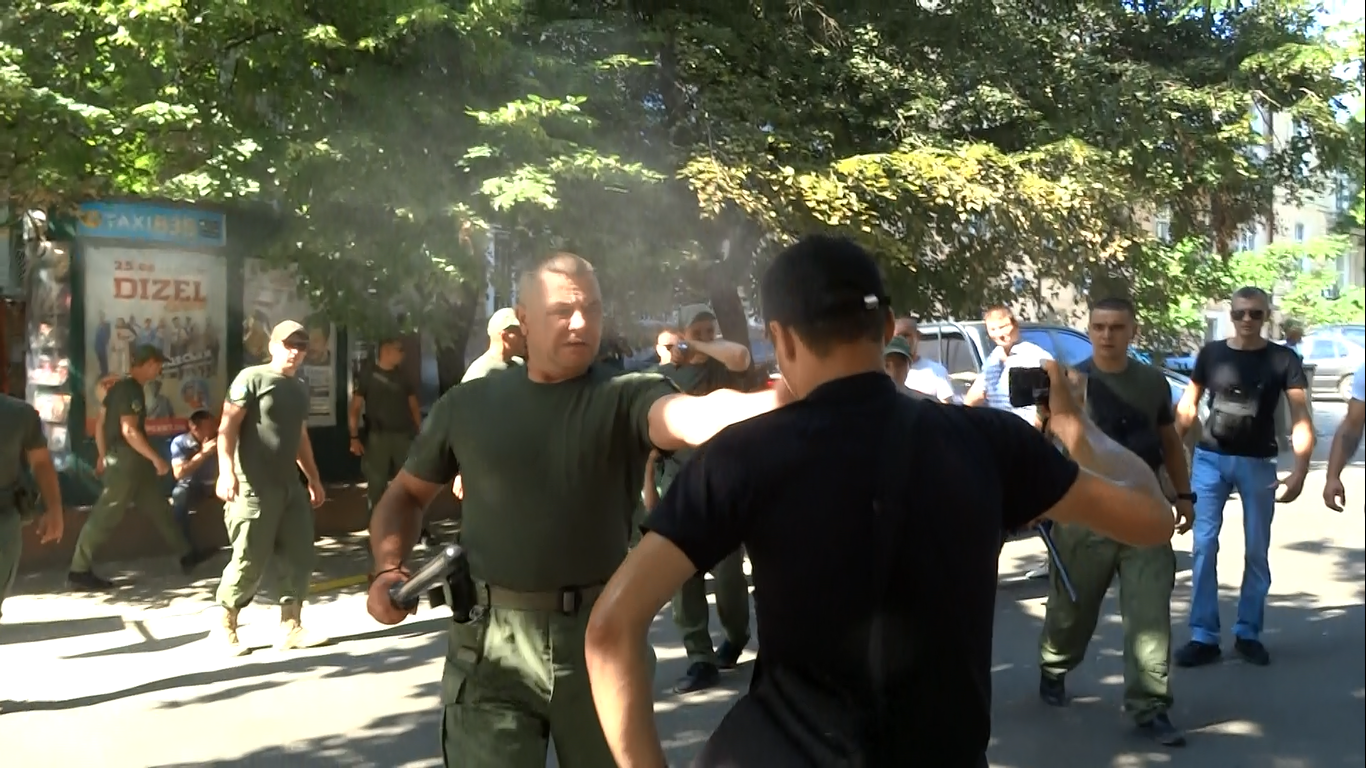
The employees of the municipal enterprise the "Municipal Guard" beat and use special means against the journalist

On July 13, 2018, members of the Municipal Guard attacked journalists who were filming the conflict between representatives of the Municipal Guard" and a law firm (Redut) in the parking lot. The reason of the conflict was the dismantling process of parking poles.

Municipal Guard members used tear gas and rubber batons to attack journalists. As a result, two journalists from the Public Priboy newspaper, Vitaly Tkachenko and Miroslav Bekchiv, as well as the journalist of the "Unsolved Crimes" newspaper Konstantin Slobodyanyuk were injured. Bekchiv was hospitalized with a traumatic brain injury, burns on the face and signs of strangulation.

Two employees of "The Municipal Guard" were given suspicion because of the attack on journalists, in relation to this incident the police initiated a criminal case under three articles of the Criminal Code of Ukraine: hooliganism, obstruction of the lawful professional activities of journalists, threat or violence against a journalist.

On July 16, 2018, the prosecutor's office petitioned the Primorsky District Court to choose the measure of restraint for the offenders.

On July 18, 2018 Primorsky District Court of Odesa appointed a house arrest for two employees of the Municipal Guard, who beat journalists. On October 9, 2018, the Odesa prosecutor's office sent indictments against two employees of the Municipal Guard.

An attack on journalists was condemned by Professor Massimo Introvigne, the former OSCE representative against racism, xenophobia and discrimination. In his opinion, the brutality of the authorities in such a minor conflict looks rather strange and is probably only "a demonstration of primitive force and power".

On September 4, 2019, members of the Municipal Guard did not admit journalists to a meeting of the Odesa City Council and tried to knock out a phone from a media employee.
