= Yuriy Holyk =

Ukrainian entrepreneur and political consultant (born 1977)

- Юрій Юрійович Голик
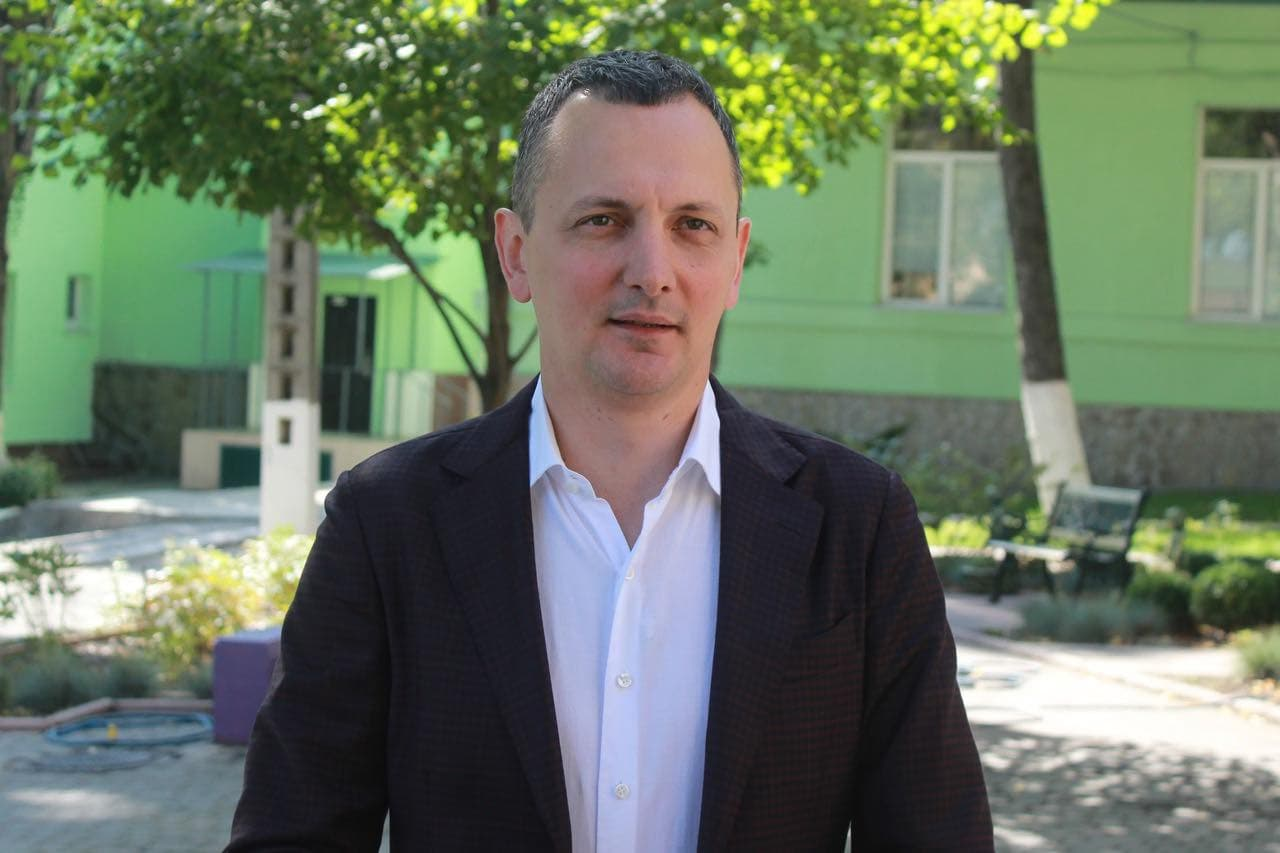
- Born: December 21, 1977 (age 48); Luhansk, Ukrainian SSR, Soviet Union
- Occupations: entrepreneur, political consultant
- Known for: Involvement in Ukraine's Great Construction program

Yuriy Yuriyovych Holyk (born December 21, 1977, in Luhansk, Ukrainian SSR) is a Ukrainian entrepreneur, political consultant, and former adviser to the head of the Dnipropetrovsk Regional State Administration. He is best known for his active involvement in the implementation of the national infrastructure program Great Construction (Velyke Budivnytstvo) and for overseeing public communications related to infrastructure projects supported by the Office of the President of Ukraine. His activities have been the subject of investigations and journalism reports.

== Early life ==
Yuriy Holyk was born on December 21, 1977, in Luhansk, Ukrainian SSR. In 1999, he earned a degree in Finance and Credit from East Ukrainian National University.

== Career ==
From 2015 to 2019, Holyk served as an advisor to Valentyn Reznichenko, the head of the Dnipropetrovsk Regional State Administration. During this period, he was actively involved in the implementation of infrastructure projects in the region.

From 2019 to 2020, he worked as an advisor to Prime Minister Oleksiy Honcharuk. In 2020, he became the coordinator of public communications for the national infrastructure program Great Construction (Ukrainian: Велике будівництво), initiated by the Office of the President of Ukraine. Holyk regularly attended government meetings related to infrastructure projects and was seen accompanying Kyrylo Tymoshenko, the deputy head of the President's Office, during regional inspections.

Since July 2019, Holyk has headed the "Regional Development" program at the Ukrainian Institute for the Future (UIF), a Kyiv-based think tank.

=== Advisor to the Head of the Dnipropetrovsk Oblast Administration ===
From 2015 to 2019, Holyk served as a freelance advisor to the heads of the Zaporizhzhia and Dnipropetrovsk regional state administrations. He was responsible for infrastructure policy, the implementation of the ProZorro and iGov systems, and other initiatives.

In June 2024, Holyk was mentioned in Ukrainian media reports concerning an investigation into the alleged misuse of funds for road works in Dnipropetrovsk Oblast. His residence was searched. When NABU and SAP announced the completion of the investigation in December 2025, they stated that five individuals had been notified of suspicion (including former regional governor Valentyn Reznichenko), Holyk was not identified among them. No formal charge or notice of suspicion has been issued against him.

==== Kindergartens ====
While serving as a freelance advisor to Valentyn Reznichenko, journalists referred to Holyk as the architect behind the modern design of preschool facilities. Kindergartens shaped like honeycombs and designed in the Scandinavian architectural style were built in the region; these facilities featured large, floor-to-ceiling windows with heating. Over the course of 4.5 years, 60 kindergartens were built and renovated; 60 environmental projects were implemented (ranging from cleaning up water bodies and flood protection to restocking lakes and rivers with fish); 55 water pipelines were constructed, providing 90% of the population with drinking water; and 100 boiler rooms were built, and Pokrov and Marganets have completely phased out gas.

== Volunteering ==
Holyk initiated the renaming of streets in Dnipropetrovsk Oblast to honor the Righteous Among the Nations, oversaw the opening of the Alley of Heroes commemorating Ukrainian defenders killed in the Russian-Ukrainian War, and organized the creation of Ukraine's first inclusive children's park near the Dnipropetrovsk Regional State Administration.

After 2014, with Holyk's support, video surveillance systems were installed in the areas of Pisky, Opytne, and Vodyane.

=== Drones ===
Following the full-scale Russian invasion of Ukraine, Holyk assembled a team of developers that in July 2024 unveiled the STING Spider relay drone, designed to resist electronic warfare, extend the signal range of other drones, such as kamikaze drones and bombers, and carry payloads of up to 2 kg. The team also developed the SpyGun reconnaissance drone, described as being nearly invisible.

== Controversies ==
In 2022, the program "Schemes: Corruption in Detail" aired an investigation into possible corruption schemes within the "Great Construction" program. In December, Holyk's home was searched, but no charges were brought against him.

In June 2024, Bihus.Info reported that Holyk could have received confidential information from NABU through Georgiy Birkadze, an adviser to the Office of the President. Journalists published screenshots of messages they alleged were sent by Birkadze and contained confidential information. Law enforcement authorities did not confirm the allegations or bring any charges in connection with the matter.

=== Allegations of tender manipulation ===
In 2024, during searches conducted by NABU, investigators seized Holyk's mobile phones. Messages exchanged with businessman Denys Ostrovskyi, the former owner of the construction company SK Stroyinvest, dating from 2021 to 2024, were subsequently revealed. Following this correspondence, in November 2021, Stroyinvest won a tender to construct a cultural center in Kaniv, Cherkasy Oblast.

== Jewish Confederation of Ukraine ==
In July 2020, Yuriy Holyk joined the Presidium of the Jewish Confederation of Ukraine.

== Awards ==
- No. 95 among the 100 most influential Ukrainians according to "Korrespondent" magazine (2019)
