= Serhiy Lysak =

Ukrainian brigadier general

Serhii Lysak
- Сергій Лисак
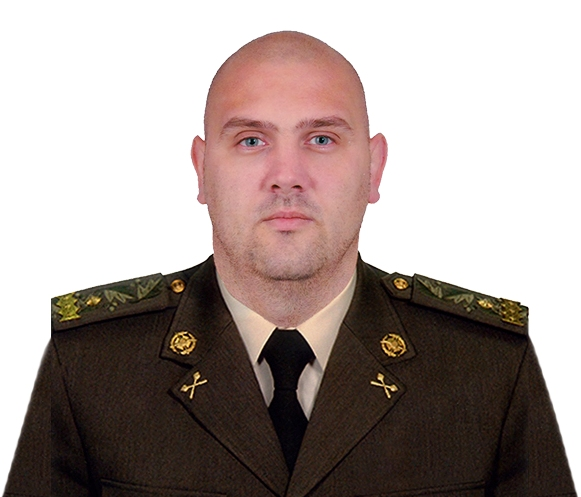
- Official portrait, 2022

Head of the Odesa City Military Administration
- Incumbent
- Assumed office 15 October 2025
- Preceded by: Gennadiy Trukhanov (as Mayor of Odesa)

Governor of Dnipropetrovsk Oblast
- In office 7 February 2023 – 15 October 2025
- Preceded by: Volodymyr Orlov (acting)
- Succeeded by: Vladyslav Haivanenko (acting)

Personal details
- Born: 21 December 1975 (age 50) Odesa, Ukrainian SSR, Soviet Union

Military service
- Allegiance: Ukraine
- Branch/service: Security Service of Ukraine
- Years of service: 2014–present
- Rank: Brigadier general
- Battles/wars: Russo-Ukrainian War; War in Donbas; Russian invasion of Ukraine; Russian occupation of Zhytomyr Oblast

Serhii Petrovych Lysak (Ukrainian: Сергій Петрович Лисак) is a Ukrainian brigadier general currently serving as head of the city military administration of Odesa since 15 October 2025.

Lysak is a former agent of the Security Service of Ukraine who was the Governor of Dnipropetrovsk Oblast from February 2023 to his appointment as head of the Odesa city military administration.

== Biography ==
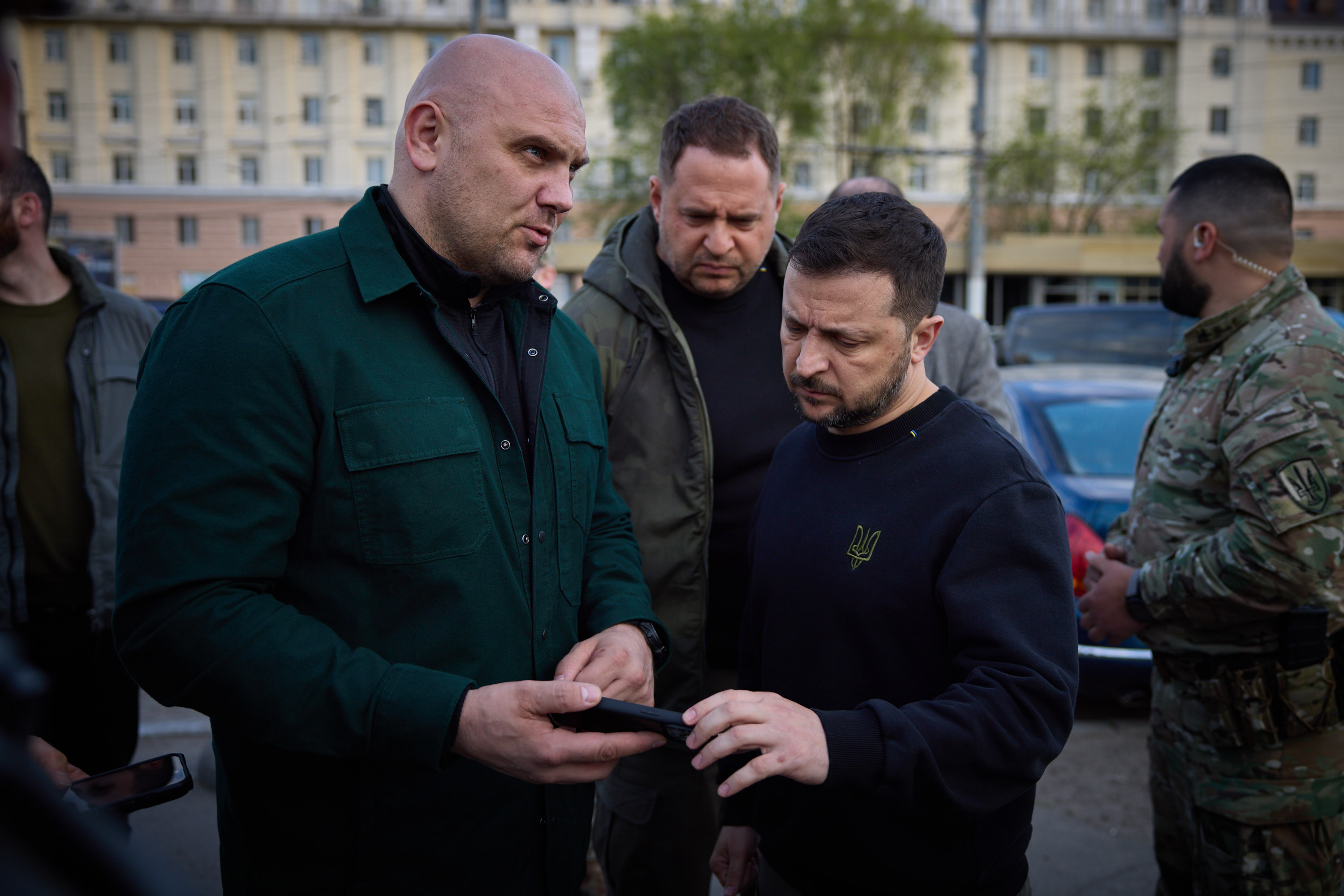
Lysak speaks with President Volodymyr Zelenskyy in Dnipro, April 2024

Lysak is a former agent of the Security Service of Ukraine and studied at the National Academy of the Security Service of Ukraine. He started his career in the early 2000s, holding operational position in the central office of the SBU. His specialization was in counterintelligence and counterterrorism. During the start of the 2010s, he served in regional SBU offices in Kyiv, Odesa, and Zhytyomyr.

Lysak participated in the War in Donbas in the years 2014 and 2015 and in 2017.

From May 2020 to July 2022, Lysak headed the Department of Security of Zhytomyr Oblast. Following the February 2022 Russian invasion of Ukraine he fought against the Russian occupation of the region. On 25 March 2022 President Volodymyr Zelenskyy by decree promoted Lysak to the rank of brigadier general. In July 2022 he was appointed the head of the Security Service of Ukraine in Dnipropetrovsk Oblast.

On 7 February 2023, President Zelenskyy appointed Lysak the new Governor of Dnipropetrovsk Oblast.

On 15 October 2025 President Zelenskyy decreed that Odesa had been placed under a city military administration. The same day President Zelenskyy appointed Lysak as the head of the Odesa city military administration. One of his first actions was to liquidate the Odessa Municipal Guard.

== Personal life ==
According to the BBC, he has a love for sports, particularly Greco-Roman wrestling, and is the vice president of the Ukrainian federation of Greco-Roman wrestling.
