= Valentyn Reznichenko =

Ukrainian politician

- Валентин Резніченко
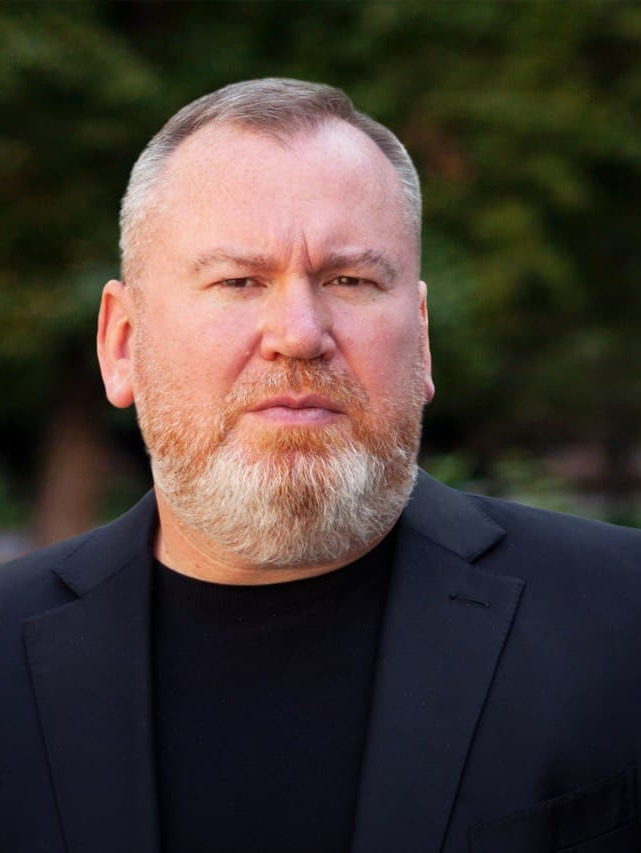

Governor of Dnipropetrovsk Oblast
- In office 11 December 2020 – 24 January 2023
- Preceded by: Oleksandr Bondarenko
- Succeeded by: Volodymyr Orlov (acting); Serhiy Lysak
- In office 26 March 2015 – 27 June 2019
- Preceded by: Ihor Kolomoyskyi
- Succeeded by: Oleksandr Bondarenko

Governor of Zaporizhzhia Oblast
- In office 20 February 2015 – 26 March 2015
- Preceded by: Valeriy Baranov
- Succeeded by: Hryhoriy Samardak

Personal details
- Born: Valentyn Mykhaylovych Reznichenko; 22 April 1972 (age 53) Dnipropetrovsk, Ukrainian SSR, Soviet Union (now Dnipro, Ukraine)

Valentyn Mykhaylovych Reznichenko (Ukrainian: Валентин Михайлович Резніченко; born on 22 April 1972), is a Ukrainian government official who was the Governor of Dnipropetrovsk Oblast from 11 December 2020 until 24 January 2023. He was also the Governor of Zaporizhzhia Oblast (20 February - 26 March 2015) before being appointed as the Dnipropetrovsk governor from March 2015 to June 2019.

Reznichenko previously worked as a press manager and broadcasting engineer. He was the press manager of the Ukrainian State Center of Radio Frequencies until August 2014.

== Biography ==
Valentyn Reznichenko was born in Dnipropetrovsk on 22 April 1972.

From 1991 to 1993, he was a technician in the department of automated control systems of the Ukrainian State Institute for Designing Metallurgical Plants.

From 1993 to 1994, he was promoted a software engineer of the first category, a leading engineer of the Svitoch Research and Production Enterprise Limited Liability Company.

In 1994, he graduated from the State Metallurgical Academy, specializing in automation of technological processes and production.

From 1994 to 1996, he was the Head of the Information and Computer Department, Head of the Marketing Department at K FK “Elf”.

As time goes by, he worked as an engineer for automation of information systems at the profile enterprises of Dnipropetrovsk.

Since 1996, he has been working at the Ukrainian Media Group Holding Company. From that year until 1999, he became the head of the repair department of the Limited Liability Company "TNP Svyaz".

From 1999 to 2001, he became President of the Closed Joint-Stock Company Telenedelya-Dnepropetrovsk. From 2001 to March 2003, he was a deputy director of Dnepr-Media Limited Liability Company. In the same time in March 2003, he was promoted as vice-president of the Ukrainian Media Holding LLC. In that position, Reznichenko headed subdivisions of various levels and areas of activity: press, radio and television. As he was engaged in the development of radio networks, he initiated the development and operation of new radio frequencies, and the development of new radio networks throughout Ukraine.

From 2004 to 2006 - General Director of the Media Furst subsidiary. From 2006 to 2011 - Director of the subsidiary “Television and Radio Organization“ Trust ”.

From 2011 to 2014 - Director General of Studio Europozitiv LLC. In June–July 2014 - Deputy Director of Capital Management Group LLC.

From August 2014 to February 2015, he became the General Director of the State Enterprise "Ukrainian State Center of Radio Frequencies".».

== Political career ==
On 20 February 2015, with the decree of the Ukrainian president Petro Poroshenko, Valetyn Reznichenko was appointed Governor of Zaporizhzhia Oblast. Reznichenko was personally represented by the President of the asset of the Zaporizhzhia Oblast.

On 25 March 2015, Poroshenko appointed Reznichenko acting Governor of the Dnipropetrovsk Oblast. He was released from this post on 27 June 2019 by a decree of President Volodymyr Zelenskyy.

In the October 2020 Ukrainian local elections, Reznichenko led the Dnipropetrovsk Oblast Council election list of the party Proposition. In this election, the party won 17 seats.

On 11 December 2020, President Zelenskyy appointed Reznichenko Governor of Dnipropetrovsk Oblast.

Zelenskyy removed him from this position on 24 January 2023.
