= Governor of Dnipropetrovsk Oblast =

Head of Military Administration of Dnipropetrovsk Oblast
- Seal of Dnipropetrovsk Oblast
- Incumbent; Oleksandr Hanzha since 8 January 2026
- Residence: Dnipro
- Term length: Four years
- Inaugural holder: Danylo Petrovsky; 1932
- Formation: 1932 as Chairman of Executive Committee of Dnipropetrovsk Oblast
- Website: Government of Dnipropetrovsk Oblast

The governor of Dnipropetrovsk Oblast is the head of executive branch for the Dnipropetrovsk Oblast.

The office of governor is an appointed position, with officeholders being appointed by the president of Ukraine, on recommendation from the prime minister of Ukraine, to serve a four-year term.

Due to the current Russo-Ukrainian War, since 24 February 2022, the governor of Dnipropetrovsk Oblast is officially called Head of the Dnipropetrovsk Regional Military Civil Administration. The official residence for the governor is located in Dnipro.

== Governors ==
=== Representative of the President ===
- Pavlo Lazarenko (1992–1994)

=== Heads of the Administration ===
- Pavlo Lazarenko (1995)
- Mykola Derkach (1995–1997) (Note: Acting to August 8, 1996)
- Viktor Zabara (1997–1998)
- Oleksandr Migdeyev (1998–1999)
- Mykola Shvets (1999–2003)
- Volodymyr Yatsuba (2003–2004)
- Volodymyr Meleshchyk (2004–2005) (acting)
- Serhii Kasyanov (2005)
- Ivan Chornokur (2005) (acting)
- Yuriy Yekhanurov (2005)
- Nadiia Deyeva (2005–2007) (Note: Acting to November 11, 2005)
- Viktor Bondar (2007–2010) (Note: Acting to December 10, 2007)
- Semen Krol (2010) (acting)
- Viktor Sergeyev (2010) (acting)
- Oleksandr Vilkul (2010–2012)
- Dmytro Kolesnikov (2012–2014)
- Ihor Kolomoyskyi (2014–2015)
- Valentyn Reznichenko (2015–2019)
- Dmytro Batura (2019) (acting)
- Oleksandr Bondarenko (2019–2020)
- Valentyn Reznichenko (2020–2023)
- Volodymyr Orlov (2023) (acting)
- Serhiy Lysak (2023–2025)
- Vladyslav Haivanenko (2025–2026) (acting)
- Oleksandr Hanzha (2026–present)

== Sources ==
- World Statesmen.org
