= 2020 Cherkasy regional election =

- 25 October 2020

All 64 seats in the Cherkasy Oblast Council 33 seats needed for a majority
- Turnout: 35.27% (11.88pp)
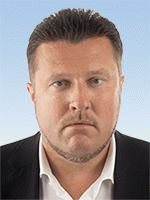
	First party	Second party	Third party
		SN
Leader	Anatolii Pidhornyi	Serhii Lisovyi	Anton Yatsenko
Party	Cherkashchany	Servant of the People	For the Future
Last election	16 seats, 15.54%	New	New
Seats won	18	12	12
Seat change	2	New	New
Popular vote	67,002	45,338	42,663
Percentage	21.41%	14.49%	13.64%
Swing	5.87pp	New	New
	Fourth party	Fifth party	Sixth party
		B	OPZZh
Leader	Roman Sushchenko	Yurii Trenkin	Volodymyr Domanskyi
Party	European Solidarity	Batkivshchyna	Opposition Platform — For Life
Last election	18 seats, 17.54% (Note: As BPP)	13 seats, 12.53%	New
Seats won	9	7	6
Seat change	9	6	New
Popular vote	33,461	24,057	19,686
Percentage	10.69%	7.69%	6.29%
Swing	6.84pp	4.84pp	New
- Election result by constituency
Head of the Oblast Council before election
Anatolii Pidhornyi
Cherkashchany
Elected Head of the Oblast Council
Anatolii Pidhornyi
Cherkashchany

The 2020 Cherkasy regional election was held on 25 October 2020, to elect the 8th Oblast Council. All 64 deputies were up for election, decreased from 84 in 2015. The elections were held simultaneously with local elections in Kyiv and twenty-four other oblasts throughout Ukraine.

Cherkashchany became the largest party in the Oblast Council, with Servant of the People and For the Future coming second and third respectively, with 12 seats both. European Solidarity, previously called Petro Poroshenko Bloc, was the biggest party in the council in 2015, but fell to fourth place with just 9 seats. Radical Party of Oleh Liashko and Svoboda fell below the 5% threshold and lost their representation.

== Electoral system ==
These were the first elections held under the newly adopted Electoral Code, which provided a fully proportional electoral system at the both local and national levels.

Each party had to form two lists: the first is united for the entire city, and the second is for individual territorial districts. The party would receive a mandate if it overcomes the 5% threshold. In this case, the No.1 candidate on the list is guaranteed to receive a seat. Candidates who receive 25% or more of the electoral quota of their district get to the top of the list in descending order of the number of votes for them. In the case of an equal number of votes, the order of candidates will remain as determined by the party at the time of voting. After the candidates who passed to the council according to the quota, the rest are placed in the order determined by the party.

Electoral quota is the number of votes needed to obtain one seat. The electoral quota is determined by the territorial election commission. For this, the commission needed to divide the total number of votes for those parties that won at least 5 percent of the voters' votes and are now participating in the distribution of mandates by the number of mandates. The number of seats into which the electoral votes had to be divided is the difference between the number of seats in the council and the number of guaranteed seats for each party that entered the council (one seat per party).

Prior to the election, Cherkasy Regional Territorial Electoral Commission divided the oblast into 7 electoral districts (okruh) with an almost even population, based on existing districts (raion) and Cherkasy, with an unfixed amount of seats.

District	Territory represented
No.1	Cherkasy (Prydniprovskyi)
No.2	Cherkasy (Sosnivskyi)
No.3	Cherkasy Raion
No.4	Cherkasy Raion
No.5	Zvenyhorodka Raion
No.6	Uman Raion
No.7	Zolotonosha Raion

== Parties and candidates ==
Below is a list of the main parties which contested the election:

Party		Lead candidate	Ideology	2015 result	
Party		Lead candidate	Ideology	%	Seats
YeS	European Solidarity; Європейська солідарність	Roman Sushchenko	Liberal conservatism	17.54%	18 / 84
Cherkashchany	Cherkashchany; Черкащани	Anatolii Pidhornyi	Localism	15.54%	16 / 84
Batkivshchyna	Batkivshchyna; Батьківщина	Yurii Trenkin	Populism	12.53%	13 / 84
RPOL	Radical Party of Oleh Liashko; Радикальна партія Олега Ляшка	Oleksandr Korniienko	Left-wing populism	10.25%	10 / 84
Svoboda	Svoboda; Свобода	Oleksandr Loshkov	Ultranationalism	7.52%	7 / 84
PVA	Party of Veterans of Afghanistan; Партія ветеранів Афганістану	Serhii Yakymchuk	Veterans' rights	5.01%	5 / 84
SN	Servant of the People; Слуга народу	Serhii Lisovyi	Liberalism	New	
ZM	For the Future; За майбутнє	Anton Yatsenko	Economic nationalism	New	
OPZZh	Opposition Platform — For Life; Опозиційна платформа – За життя	Volodymyr Domanskyi	Social democracy	New	
Not contesting
Revival	Revival; Відродження		Economic nationalism	8.15%	8 / 84
UKROP	Ukrainian Association of Patriots (Note: Most of party's members joined For the Future, but party de-jure continued to operate separately.); Українське об'єднання патріотів		Ukrainian nationalism	6.94%	7 / 84

== Campaign ==
=== Party slogans ===
Party	Original slogan	English translation	Ref.
Cherkashchany	«Голосуй за своїх!»	"Vote for your people!"	
SN	«Буде так, як вирішиш ти!»	"It will be the way as you decide!"	
ZM	«Робили, робимо і будемо робити»	"We have done, are doing and will continue to do"	
YeS	«Обирай кращих! Обирай ЄС»	"Choose better ones! Choose YeS"	
Batkivshchyna	«Надійна команда порядних людей!»	"A reliable team of decent people!"	
OPZZh	«Крокуємо до комфортної громади»	"Moving towards a comfortable community"	

=== Debates ===
Date	Organisers	Moderator(s)	P Present (Note: Denotes a lead candidate attending the event.) S Surrogate (Note: Denotes a lead candidate not attending the event, sending a surrogate in their place.) NI Not invited A Absent invitee															
Date	Organisers	Moderator(s)	ChE	SN	ZM	YeS	B	OPZZh	KSR	SiCh	RPOL	NK	H	PVA	SP	S	PRO	Ref.
7 October	UA:Cherkasy	Maryna Denysenko	S Petrenko	NI	NI	NI	P Trenkin	NI	NI	NI	NI	NI	P Shmyhol	S Dehteriov	NI	NI	NI	
8 October	UA:Cherkasy	Maryna Denysenko	NI	S Novytskyi	A	NI	NI	NI	NI	NI	P Korniienko	P Zviriaka	NI	NI	NI	NI	NI	
9 October	UA:Cherkasy	Maryna Denysenko	NI	NI	NI	NI	NI	P Domanskyi	NI	P Boiechko	NI	NI	NI	NI	NI	P Loshkov	A	
12 October	UA:Cherkasy	Maryna Denysenko	NI	NI	NI	S Koval	NI	NI	A	NI	NI	NI	NI	NI	S Vysochyn	NI	NI	

== Opinion polls ==
Fieldwork date	Polling firm	Sample size	European Solidarity	All-Ukrainian Union "Cherkashchany"	Batkivshchyna	Radical Party of Oleh Liashko	Svoboda (political party)	Our Land (Ukraine)	Servant of the People	For the Future (political party)	Opposition Platform — For Life	Strength and Honor	Holos (political party)	Other	Lead
26 September-2 October 2020	Hromadska dumka	2,400	13.1	11.8	14.4	7.0	—	9.8	19.7	11.6	6.3	—	—	4.7	5.3
10-15 September 2020	Rating	1,600	9.3	8.7	12.1	6.1	2.3	1.7	20.5	21.5	4.9	1.4	3.1	8.5	1.0
6-14 September 2020	Hromadska dumka	2,400	14.8	11.5	17.3	6.7	—	8.1	24.0	—	7.4	—	—	10.3	6.7
25 October 2015	2015 Cherkasy regional election		17.54	15.54	12.53	10.25	7.52	0.99	—	—	—	—	—	35.63	2.0

== Results ==
Party	Votes	%	Seats	+/–
Cherkashchany	67,002	21.41	18	+2
Servant of the People	45,338	14.49	12	New
For the Future	42,663	13.64	12	+5
European Solidarity	33,461	10.69	9	–9
Batkivshchyna	24,057	7.69	7	–6
Opposition Platform — For Life	19,686	6.29	6	New
Serhii Rudyk's Team — Time for Change!	14,036	4.49	0	New
Strength and Honor	10,869	3.47	0	New
Radical Party of Oleh Liashko	9,164	2.93	0	–10
Our Land	9,066	2.90	0	0
Holos	8,478	2.71	0	New
Party of Veterans of Afghanistan	7,650	2.44	0	–5
Self Reliance	7,579	2.42	0	New
Svoboda	7,558	2.42	0	–7
Proposition	6,278	2.01	0	New
Total	312,885	100.00	64	–20
Valid votes	312,885	91.54		
Invalid/blank votes	28,906	8.46		
Total votes	341,791	100.00		
Registered voters/turnout	969,137	35.27		
Source: CEC
