= Russian warship, go fuck yourself =

Ukrainian slogan

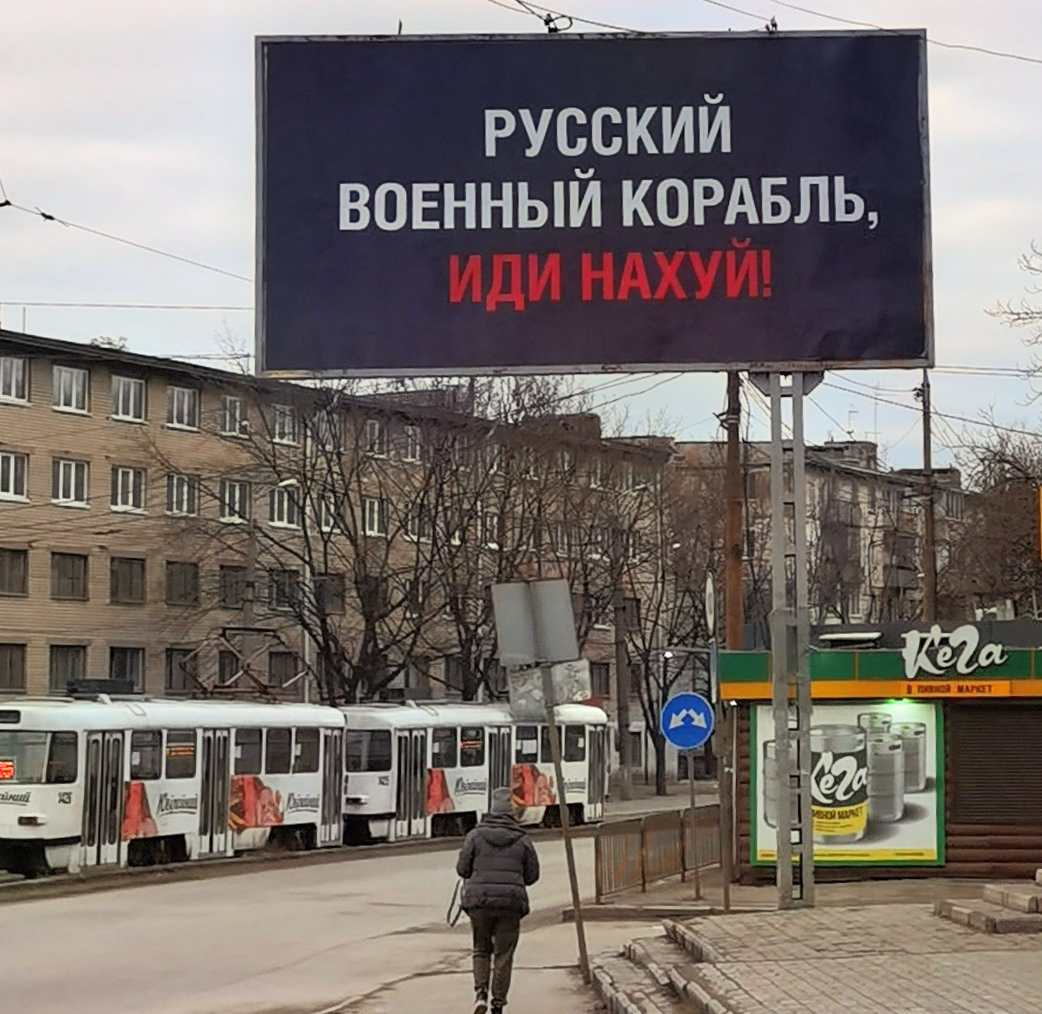
Billboard in Dnipro, Ukraine, with the statement written in Russian

"Russian warship, go fuck yourself" (Note: Russian: Русский военный корабль, иди нахуй, romanized: Russky voyenny korabl, idi nakhuy, pronounced [ˈrusːkʲɪj vɐˈjenːɨj kɐˈrablʲ ɪˈdʲi ˈnaxʊj]; Ukrainian: Російський військовий кораблю, іди на хуй, romanized: Rosiiskyi viiskovyi korabliu, idy na khui) was the final communication made on 24 February, the first day of the 2022 Snake Island campaign, by Ukrainian border guard Roman Hrybov to the Russian missile cruiser Moskva. The phrase was widely adopted as a slogan during the Russian invasion of Ukraine, as well as in pro-Ukrainian protests and demonstrations in the West. Weeks later, the phrase was commemorated on a postage stamp by Ukrposhta, the Ukrainian postal service.

The Ukrainian border guards were originally believed to have been all killed, but Hrybov was later confirmed by the Ukrainian Navy to be "alive and well" and had surrendered to the Russian Navy in the attack. During Hrybov's captivity, his family applied for a defensive trademark on the slogan. On his release, Hrybov was awarded a medal for his actions at the end of March.

On 13 April 2022, one day after the first issue of the commemorative stamp, the Moskva was critically damaged by an explosion caused by Ukrainian anti-ship missiles, and sank the following day. Ukrposhta responded to this event by releasing an altered version of the postage stamp soon after, with the warship removed from the scene.

== Background ==
=== Encounter ===
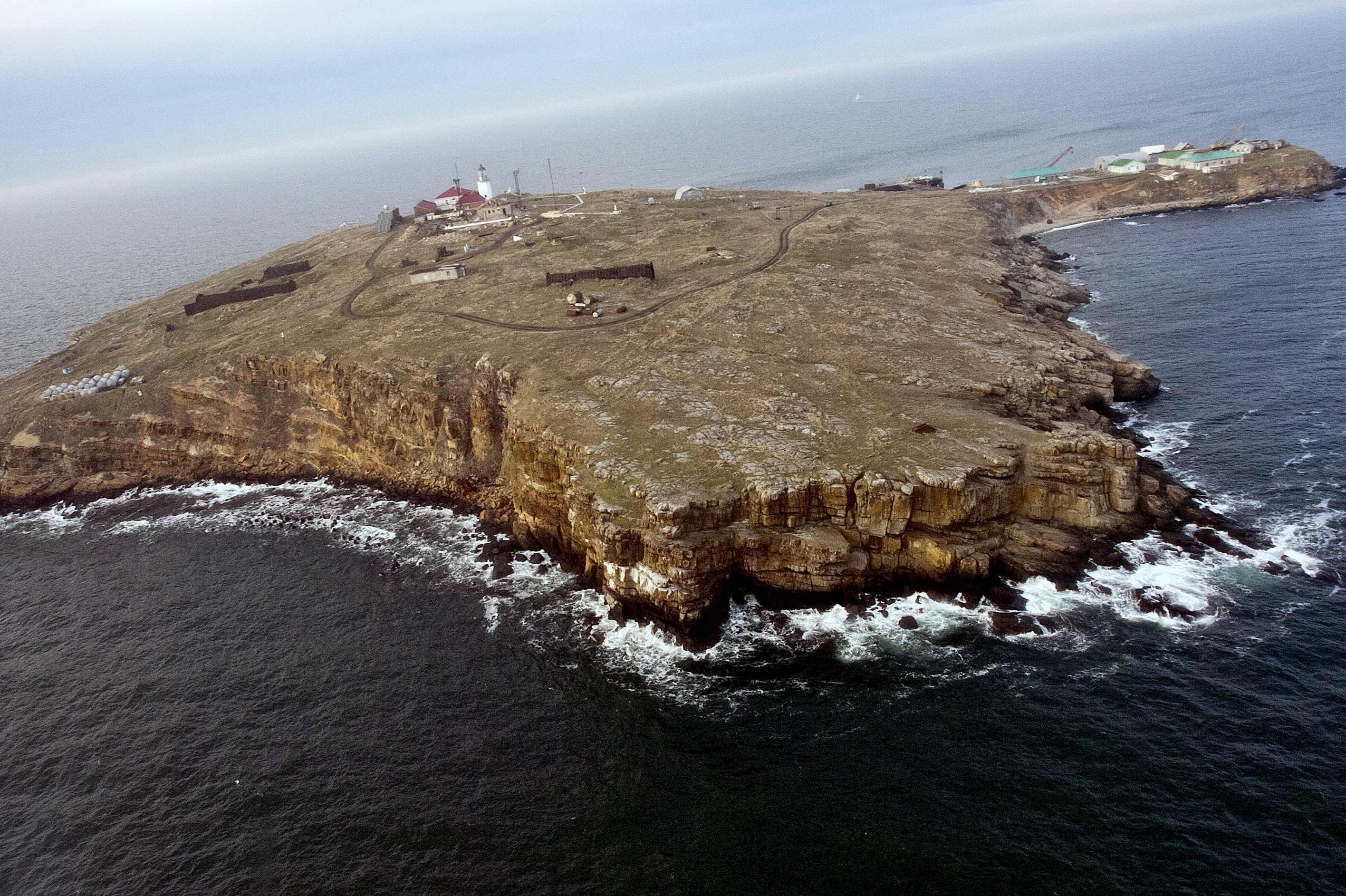
Snake Island in 2008

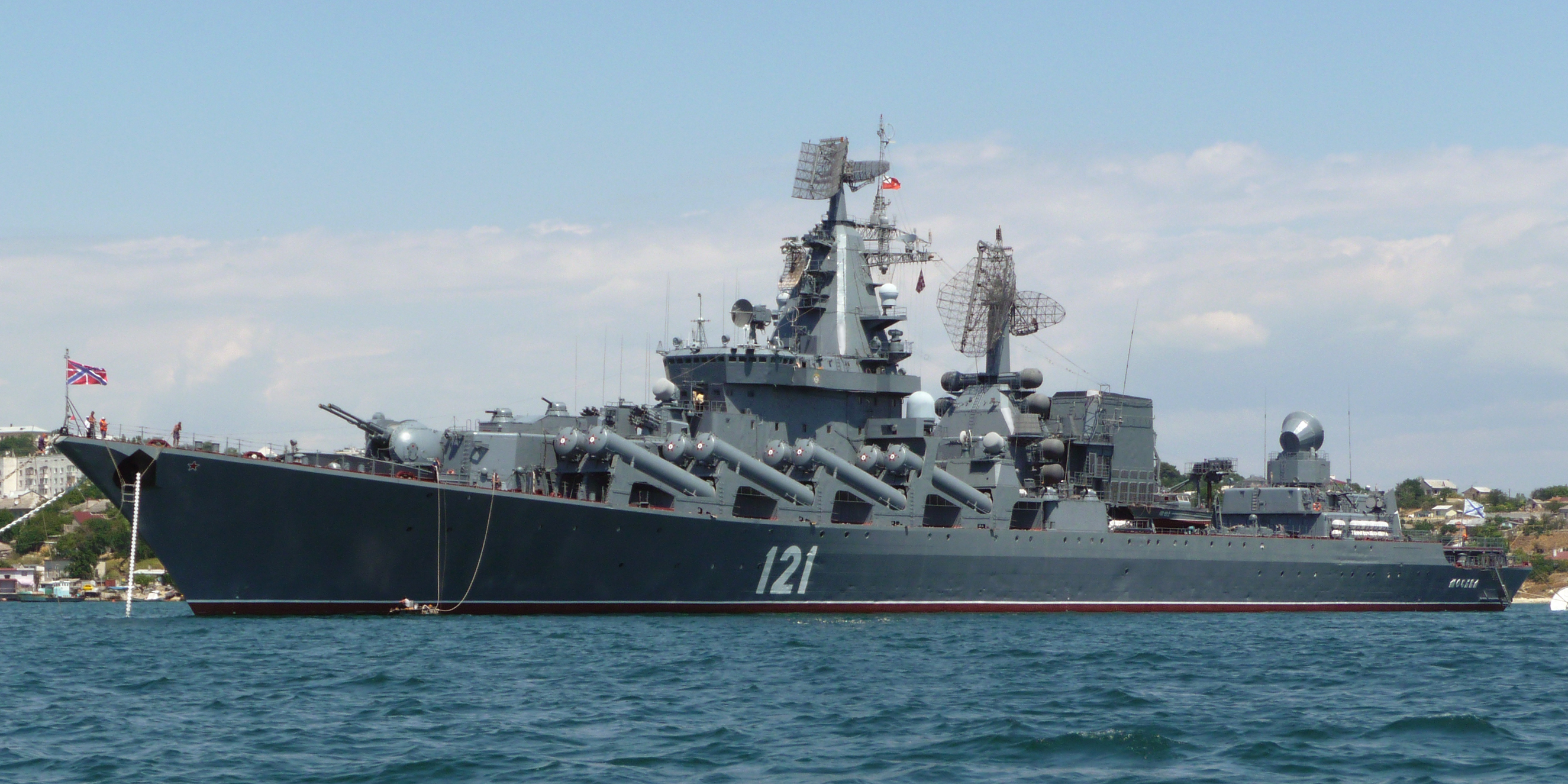
Cruiser Moskva in 2009

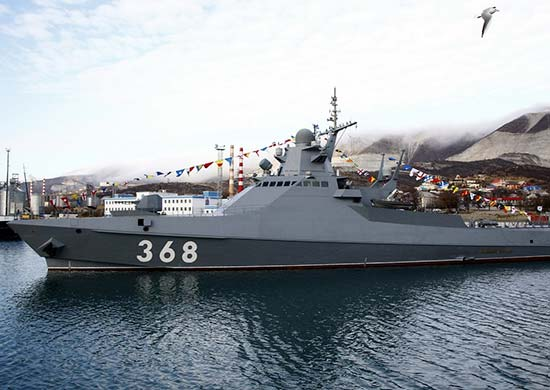
Patrol ship Vasily Bykov in 2022

On 24 February 2022, the Russian flagship cruiser Moskva and patrol ship Vasily Bykov began an assault on Snake Island, a Ukrainian island located in the Black Sea near the Danube Delta. It is a small island with a single village populated by fewer than 30 people, that had a contingent of 13 border guards, all belonging to the Izmail Border Detachment, stationed on the island at the time of the attack. Moskva called on the soldiers to surrender in return for their safety, which was firmly declined by the defenders.

The audio of the interaction was originally posted by the Ukrainian online newspaper Ukrainska Pravda. The exchange, which took place in Russian, has been translated as:

Russian warship: "Snake Island, I, Russian warship, repeat the offer: put down your arms and surrender, or you will be bombed. Have you understood me? Do you copy?"

Ukrainian 1 to Ukrainian 2: "That's it, then. Or, do we need to fuck them back off?"

Ukrainian 2 to Ukrainian 1: "Might as well."

Ukrainian 1: "Russian warship, go fuck yourself."

"Ukrainian 1" is believed to be Roman Hrybov (also transliterated Gribov), a member of the State Border Guard Service of Ukraine. The line has also been translated as "Fuck you, Russian warship." Author and academic Alex Abramovich, writing in the London Review of Books, noted that a more literal translation of "иди на хуй", transliterated as "Idi na khuy", is "Go to a dick", or more idiomatically, "Go sit on a dick".

Subsequently, Snake Island was captured by the Russian naval forces, and Ukraine had initially thought and reported that the thirteen soldiers defending it were all killed in the Russian assault. Ukrainian president Volodymyr Zelenskyy announced he would "posthumously" award the soldiers on Snake Island with the highest Ukrainian honour, the Hero of Ukraine. Russia however denied those accounts and stated that all the soldiers were not dead, but had surrendered and been taken as prisoners.

=== Aftermath ===
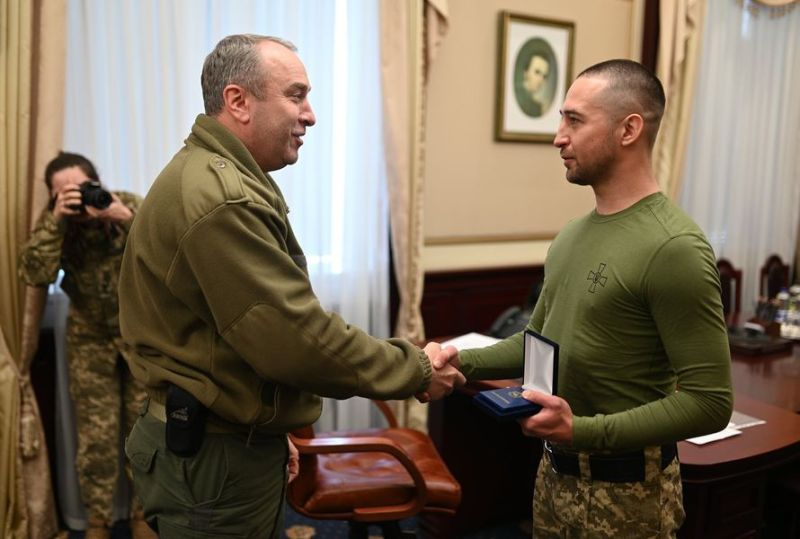
Roman Hrybov (right) receiving an award from Governor of Cherkasy Oblast Ihor Taburets in March 2022.

On 28 February 2022, the Ukrainian Navy announced that all of the border guards were alive and detained by the Russian Navy. On 24 March 2022, some of the Snake Island border guards, including Roman Hrybov, were returned to Ukraine in a prisoner exchange. On 29 March 2022, Hrybov returned to his native Cherkasy Oblast, and was given a medal by Governor of Cherkasy Oblast Ihor Taburets for his actions.

On 13 April 2022, Ukrainian presidential adviser Oleksiy Arestovych and Odesa governor Maksym Marchenko said that Moskva had been hit by two Neptune anti-ship missiles and was on fire in rough seas. A source at the Pentagon in the US later confirmed that Moskva had been hit by Ukrainian missiles. Russian state-owned news agencies said the ship was badly damaged and its crew was evacuated due to a "fire" from "detonated ammunition". The ship sank while being towed to a naval base. Russian troops were garrisoned on the island until late June 2022, when the Ukrainian military successfully retook the island. The island currently houses a small observational detachment under Ukrainian control.

== Reception ==
Recordings of the exchange became widely circulated on the internet and went viral on various social media platforms, and it has since become a rallying cry by both the Ukrainian military, and civilians protesting the invasion.

US Senator Ben Sasse mentioned the phrase while speaking on the Senate floor on 28 February:

One Ukrainian after conversing with some of his colleagues a little bit on a recording that many of you may have now heard, decided to turn up the volume and he announced, "Russian warship, idi nakhuy". [...] That is now the rallying cry of the Ukrainian resistance [...].

Andrew Keen writing in the Literary Hub noted that as a result of the slogan, "Even the f-word had been weaponized" and that it was now a "popular internet meme of resistance to the Russian invasion". The Washington Post said that "Ukraine is fighting back, one swear word at a time".

=== Historical comparisons ===
The Week compared the phrase to "Remember the Alamo" from the 19th-century Texas Revolution. The Small Wars Journal likened the phrase to other notable battle taunts such as Molon labe ('come and take [them]'), from the Battle of Thermopylae, and "Nuts!", from the Battle of the Bulge, amongst other phrases.

The phrase also has been compared to another moment in Ukraine's history, the alleged 17th-century correspondence between the Ottoman sultan and the Cossacks (popularised by the 19th-century painting by Ilya Repin Reply of the Zaporozhian Cossacks), when a Sultan of the Ottoman Empire (usually identified as Mehmed IV) demanded the surrender of either the Chyhyryn Cossacks or the Zaporozhian Cossacks (who lived in modern Central Ukraine), who allegedly refused and answered with a profanity-laden letter.

== Continued use ==
=== By individuals ===
Two days after the initial utterance, the Ukrainian Armed Forces blew up a railway junction connecting Ukrainian and Russian railways to prevent the Russian army from transporting military equipment and personnel into Ukraine by rail. When the Russian military asked Ukraine to restore the junction for humanitarian reasons, the Ukrainian dispatcher replied, "Russian train, go fuck yourself!". The following day, a Russian ship approached a Georgian oil tanker to ask for fuel. The latter replied "Russian ship, go fuck yourself" (русский корабль, иди на хуй, russky korabl, idi na khuy). When the Russians complained that they were almost out of fuel, they were told to use their oars.

On 24 February 2023, the Latvian MP Rihards Kols used the expression in a meeting at the Organization for Security and Co-operation in Europe in Vienna, in protest at the presence of a Russian delegation. On 27 July, Georgian residents chanted the same expression to protest against the Astoria Grande cruise ship which arrived in Batumi with Russian tourists.

=== In multi-media ===
In March 2022, Ukrainian band Botashe released a song titled "PNH" (Ukrainian: ПНХ), which predominantly features the phrase. On the 21st of that month, the Russian Ministry of Defence posted an image on its official Telegram channel that read "Never anger a Russian warship" (Никогда не злите русский военный корабль, Nikogda ne zlite russky voyenny korabl), which provoked a thousand "Russian warship go fuck yourself" comments in three hours. Eight days later, the Ukrainian Ministry of Defence released the "Ukrainian military Oscars" (in tandem with the 94th Academy Awards) and gave the award for Best Picture to the sinking of the Saratov on 21 March, in Berdiansk, and to which it ascribed the mock-film title, "Russian Warship, Go F*** Yourself in Berdyansk".

== Commemorative stamps ==
=== Design ===
On 1 March 2022, Ukrposhta, the Ukrainian postal service, launched a stamp design competition on the theme of the phrase. On 12 March 2022, the First Deputy Foreign Minister Emine Dzhaparova announced that artist Borys Grokh's work won the popular vote of Ukrposhta for the sketch for the stamp. Fact-checking site Snopes said that Grokh had lived in Yevpatoria in the Crimea all his life and was studying to be an artist, but as a result of the Russian invasion of Crimea in 2014, he was forced to leave his home and had moved to Kyiv and later to Lviv. Snopes quoted that Ukrposhta encouraged Ukrainians to send the stamp to their "friends abroad or send a fiery 'hello' to the Russians". Ukrposhta issued the set of commemorative postage stamps on 12 April.

The stamps feature a drawing of a Ukrainian soldier presenting the middle finger to the Russian cruiser Moskva. The overall layout with the ochre land underneath the blue sea mimics the colours of the Flag of Ukraine. The special postmark accompanying the stamp shows the outline of Snake Island. The stamp design is available in both a domestic and foreign version. President Zelenskyy had his picture taken with the stamps and commented that Russian warships should only sail in one direction, back to Russia.

The design won the Assiago Award for the best designed postage stamp of 2022.

–		
Issuing date	12 April 2022	
Number by catalogue	No. 1985	No. 1984
Size of a stamp	40,5×30 mm	40,6×26 mm
Size of the stamp sheet	148×86 mm	105×105 mm
Number of stamps per sheet	6 (3×2)	6 (2×3)
Printing run of each stamp	500,000	500,000
Denomination	W (equivalent of $1.5 USD)	F (₴23 UAH at the time)
Printing process	Offset printing	
Designer	Boris Groh	

=== Production and sales ===
Roman Hrybov and the head of the Ukrainian Post Office, Ihor Smyljanskyj, signed the first special envelopes with the stamps at the Kyiv Main Post Office. The stamp proved popular in Ukraine with thousands queuing on its release in Kyiv. Over 1 million were scheduled for print, of which 700,000 were sold across Ukraine by 20 April. 200,000 were reserved for sale in areas under Russian occupation including Crimea, and 100,000 were reserved for sale online starting on 20 April.

On 21 April, the website of the Ukrainian post office went offline, and Director General Ihor Smilianskyi reported on Facebook that the site had been hit with a distributed-denial-of-service (DDoS) attack. Although Smilianskyi did not name a perpetrator, various outlets speculated that Russia's GRU was likely responsible for the cyberattack, and that it had done so in retaliation for the sale of the stamps.

Sierra Leone also issued similar stamps on 23 June 2022.

=== Trademarking ===
On 17 March 2022, World Trademark Review (WTR) reported that lawyers for Hrybov, through his family and the Ukrainian military, had filed for an EU trademark for the slogan in both Cyrillic script and in English. The lawyers told WTR that it was needed to respond to hostile filings by clothing companies in the United States and in Lithuania who were also seeking to trademark the slogan. Techdirt commented that it was a "depressing coda to an otherwise inspiring story", but that the fact that the slogan had reached meme status from which others were profiting had likely changed the situation.

== Gallery ==
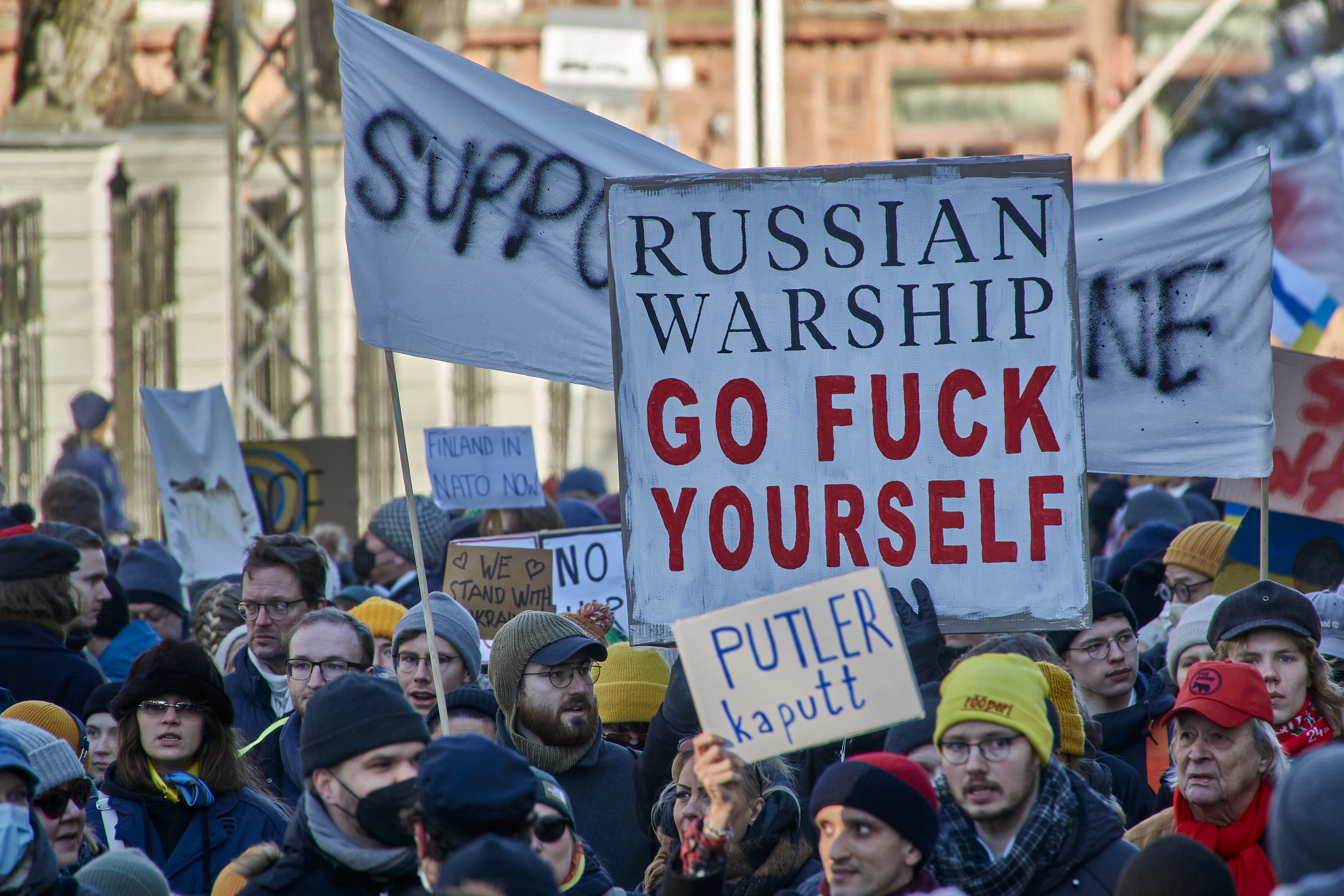
Phrase on signs in demonstration in Helsinki, Finland (26 February 2022).

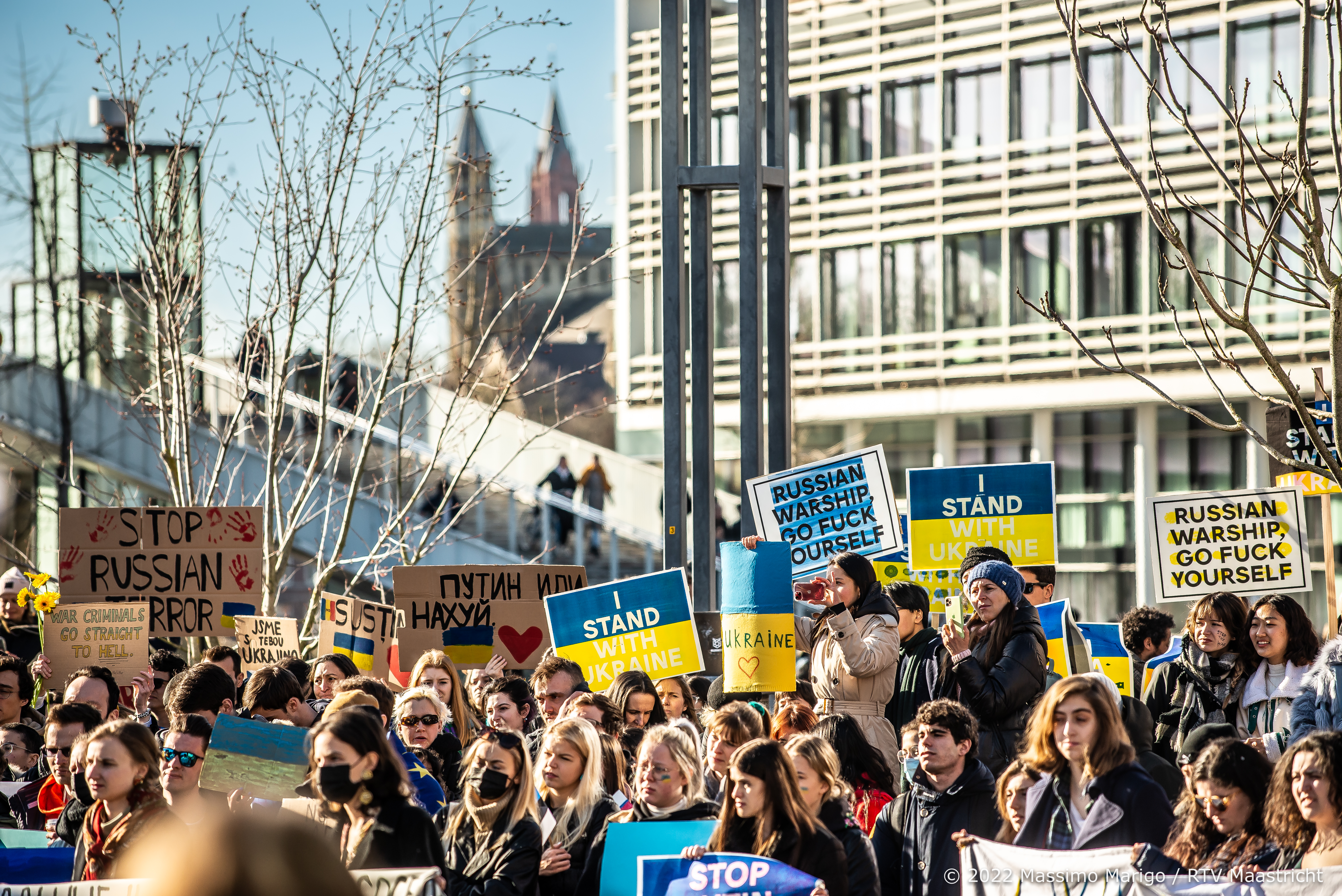
Phrase on signs in demonstration in Maastricht, Netherlands (26 February 2022).

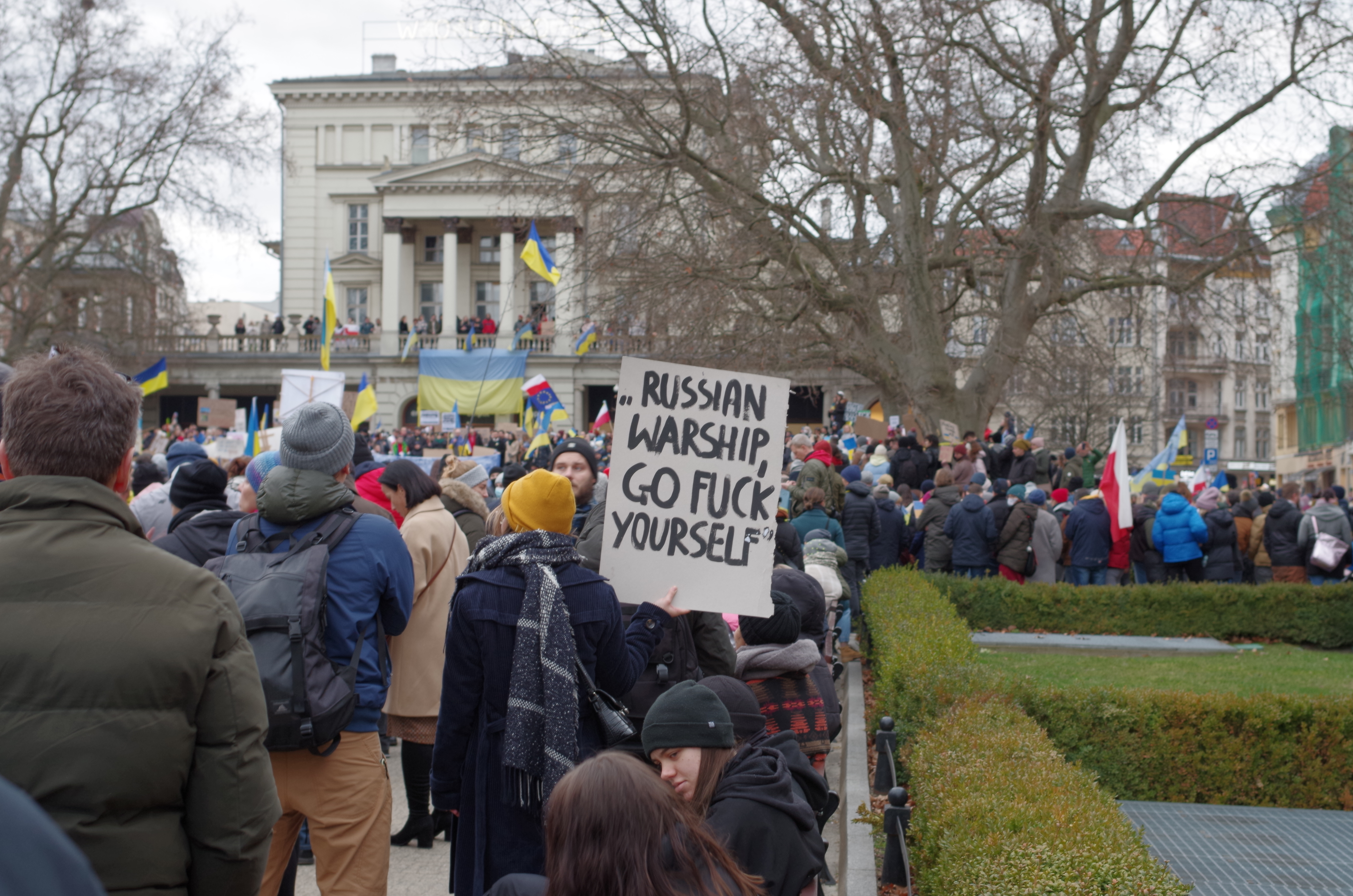
Protest in Poznań, Poland using the phrase (26 February 2022).

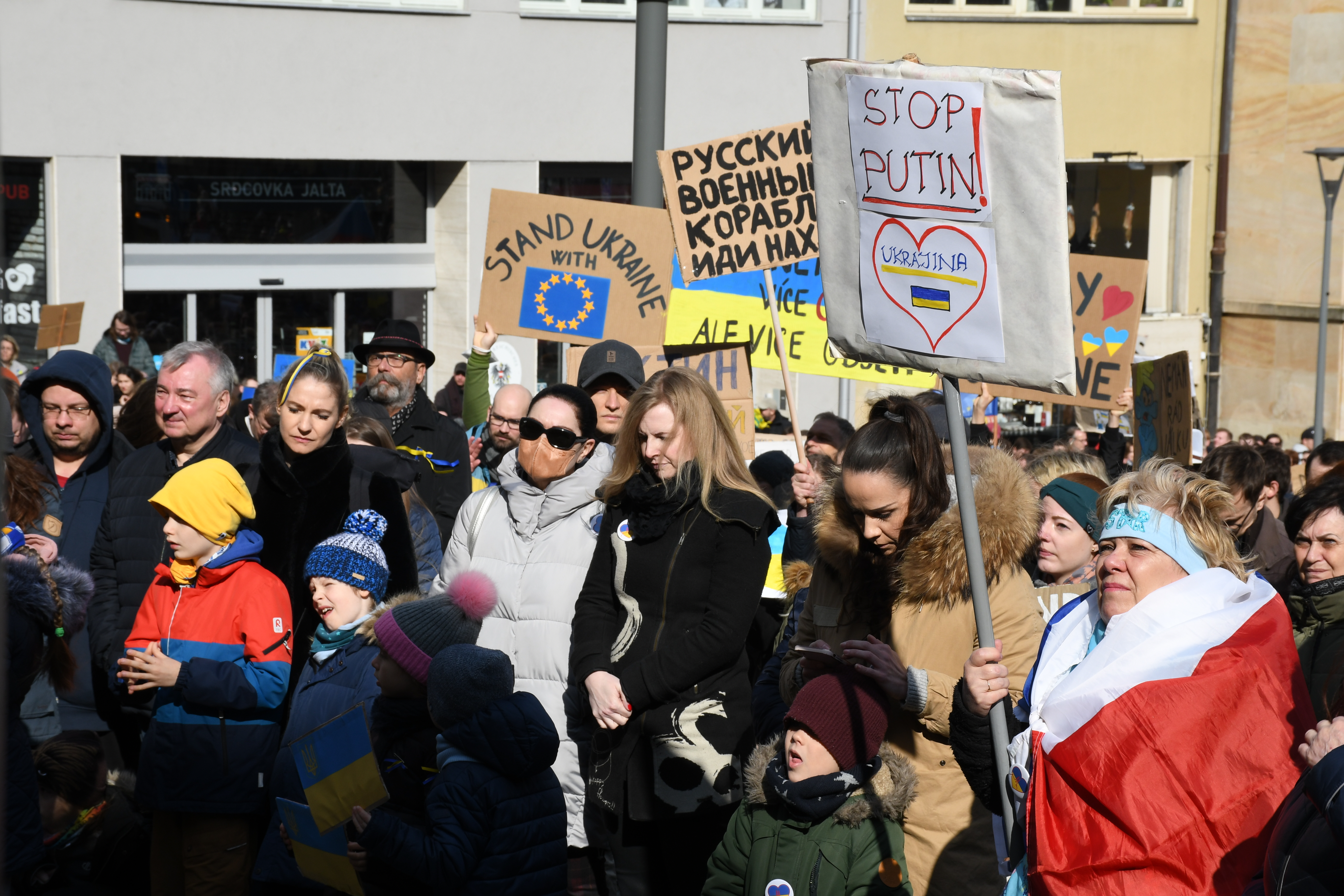
Anti-war rally in Brno, Czech Republic using the phrase in Russian (27 February 2022).

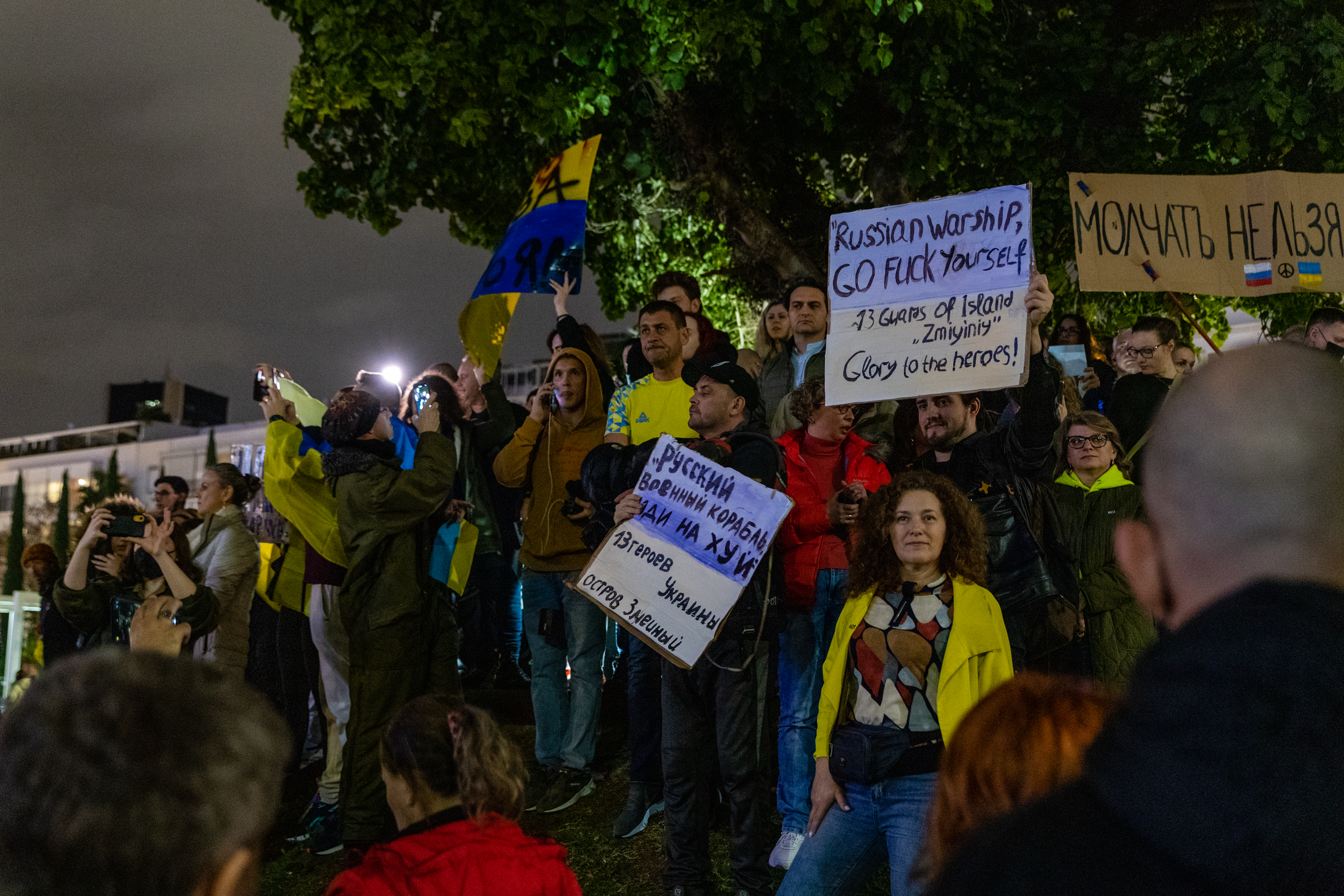
Phrase used in protests in Habima Square, Tel Aviv (26 February 2022).

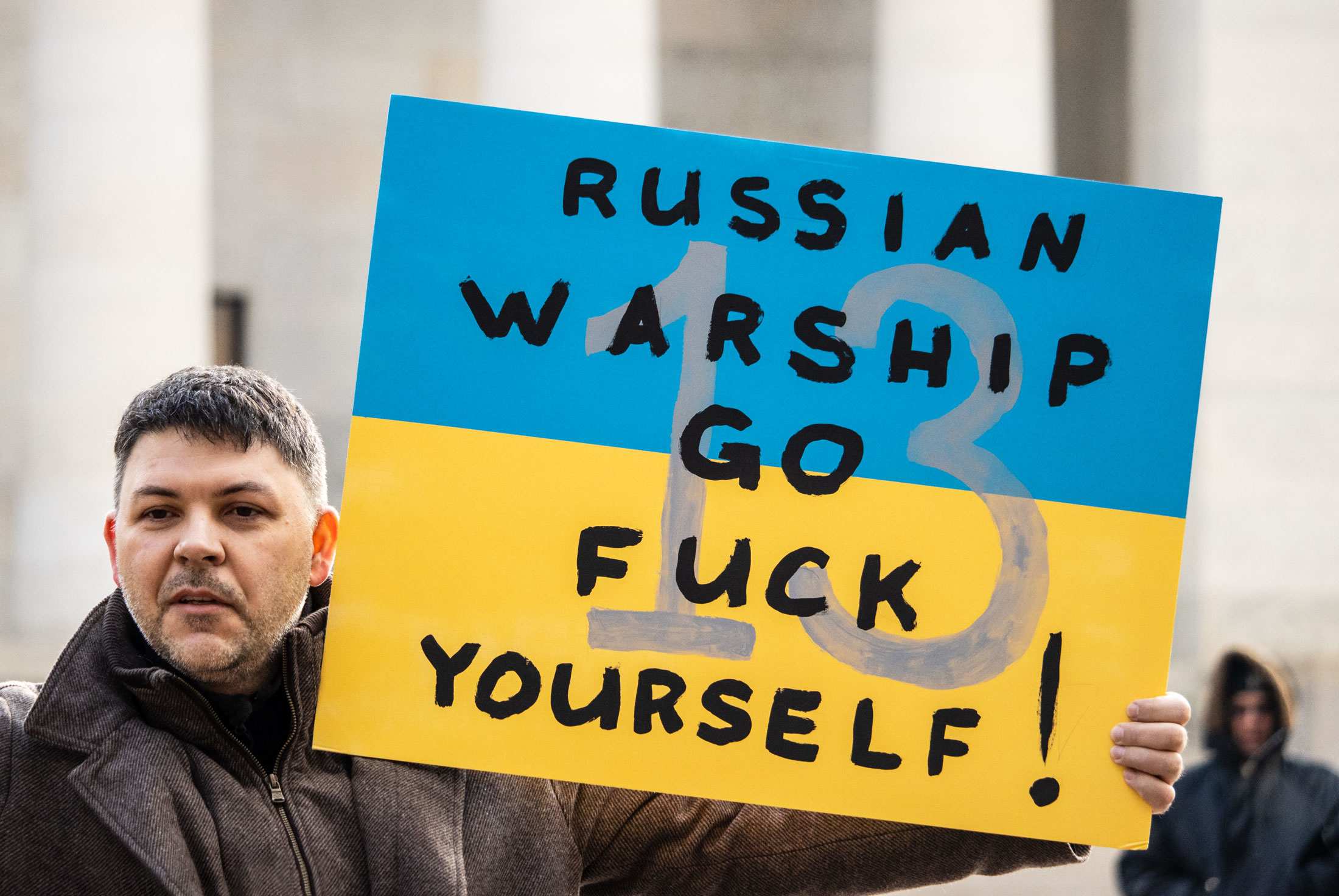
Rally in support of Ukraine in Columbus, Ohio, United States, using the phrase (26 February 2022).

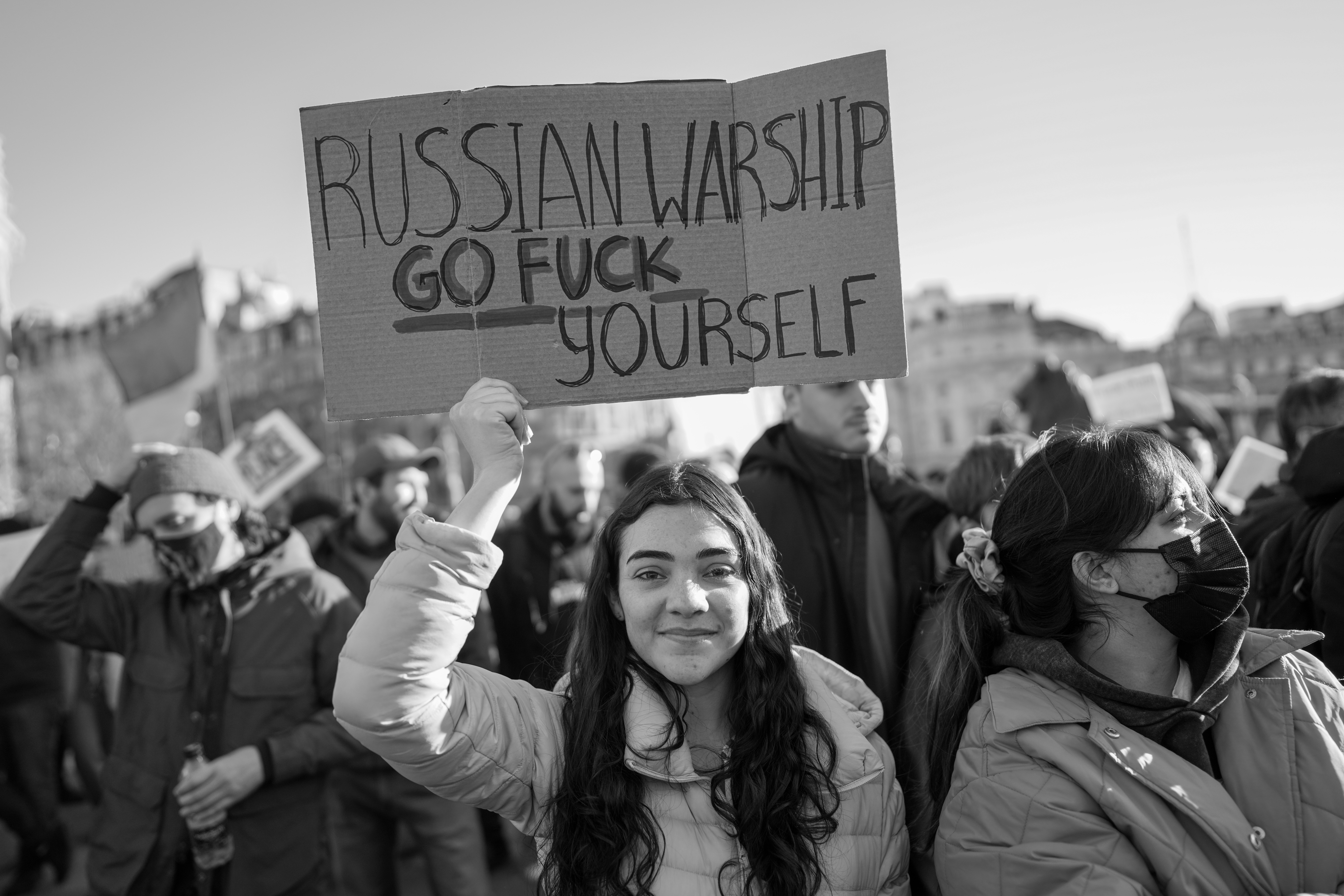
The phrase on a sign in a protest in London, England (26 February 2022).

== See also ==
- Ghost of Kyiv – Mythical Ukrainian flying ace nickname
- Grandpa in his bunker – Insulting nickname for Vladimir Putin
- I need ammunition, not a ride – quote by Volodymyr Zelenskyy refusing evacuation from Kyiv
- Putin khuylo! – Slogan deriding Vladimir Putin
- Outline of the Russo-Ukrainian war
- Putler – Neologism comparing Vladimir Putin with Adolf Hitler
- Mount Shchekavytsia orgy – Ukrainian internet meme about response to potential nuclear strike
