= Cherkasy Oblast Council =

Legislature of Cherkasy Oblast, Ukraine

Cherkasy Oblast Council Черкаська обласна рада
- 8th convocation

Type
- Type: Unicameral

Leadership
- Chairman: Anatolii Pidhornyi, Cherkashchany since 29 October 2019
- 1st Deputy Chairman: Roman Sushchenko, European Solidarity since 4 December 2020
- Deputy Chairman: Mykhailo Mushiek, Batkivshchyna since 24 January 2020
- Deputy Chairman: Serhii Lisovyi, Servant of the People since 21 December 2020

Structure
- Seats: 64
- Political groups: Cherkashchany (18); Servant of the People (12); For the Future (11); European Solidarity (9); Batkivshchyna (7); Independent (7)

Elections
- Last election: 25 October 2020

Meeting place
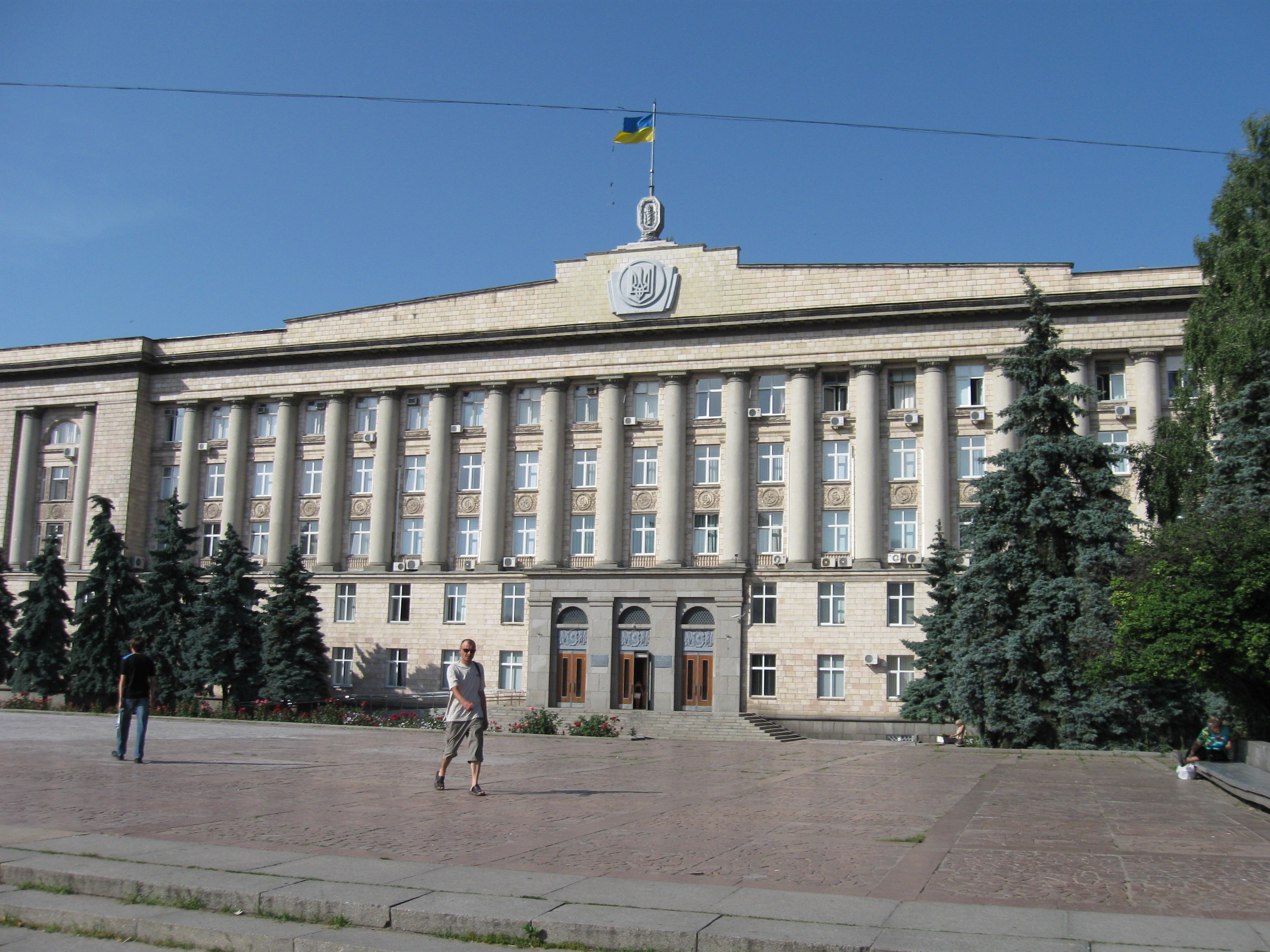
- Cherkasy, Ukraine

Website
- http://oblradack.gov.ua/

The Cherkasy Oblast Council (Ukrainian: Черкаська обласна рада) is the regional oblast council (parliament) of the Cherkasy Oblast (province) located in central Ukraine.

Council members are elected for five year terms. In order to gain representation in the council, a party must gain more than 5 percent of the total vote.

== Recent elections ==
=== 2020 ===
Distribution of seats after the 2020 Ukrainian local elections

- 18 All-Ukrainian Union "Cherkashchany"
- 12 Servant of the People
- 12 For the Future
- 9 European Solidarity
- 7 Fatherland
- 6 Opposition Platform — For Life

Election date was 25 October 2020

=== 2015 ===
Distribution of seats after the 2015 Ukrainian local elections

- 18 Solidarity
- 16 Cherkashchany
- 13 Fatherland
- 10 Radical Party
- 8 Revival
- 7 Freedom
- 7 UKROP
- 5 Veterans of Afghanistan

Election date was 25 October 2015

== Chairmen ==
=== Regional executive committee ===
- 1954–1961 Ivan Lutak
- 1961–1962 Igor Stepanenko
- 1963 Stepan Stetsenko
- 1963–1964 Stepan Stetsenko (agrarian)
- 1963–1964 Grigoriy Konotop (industrial)
- 1964–1967 Stepan Stetsenko
- 1967–1973 Nikolay Korzh
- 1973–1976 Mikhail Lipko
- 1976–1979 Alexander Gritsay
- 1979–1991 Volodymyr Shapoval
- after independence:
- 1991–1992 Kostiantyn Yastrub

=== Regional council ===
- 1990–1991 Oleksandr Ruzhytskyi
- 1991 Volodymyr Shapoval
- 1991–1992 Kostiantyn Yastrub
- 1992–1994 Hennadiy Kapralov
- 1994–1998 Vasyl Tsybenko
- 1998–2001 Volodymyr Lukyanets
- 2001–2005 Hennadiy Kapralov
- 2005–2006 Viktor Pavlichenko
- 2006–2010 Volodymyr Hres
- 2010–2014 Valeriy Chernyak
- 2014–2015 Valentyna Kovalenko
- 2015–2018 Oleksandr Velbivets
- 2018–2019 Valentyn Tarasenko (Acting)
- 2019–present Anatoliy Pidhornyy

== Subdivisions ==
=== Raion councils ===
- Horodyshche Raion council
- Drabiv Raion council
- Zhashkiv Raion council
- Zvenyhorodka Raion council
- Zolotonosha Raion council
- Kamianka Raion council
- Kaniv Raion council
- Katerynopil Raion council
- Korsun-Shevchenkivskyi Raion council
- Lysianka Raion council
- Mankivka Raion council
- Monastyryshche Raion council
- Smila Raion council
- Talne Raion council
- Uman Raion council
- Khrystynivka Raion council
- Cherkasy Raion council
- Chyhyryn Raion council
- Chornobai Raion council
- Shpola Raion council

=== City councils ===
- Cherkasy city council
  - Prydniprovskyi Urban District council
  - Sosnivskyi Urban District council
- Vatutine city council
- Zolotonosha city council
- Kaniv city council
- Smila city council
- Uman city council

== See also ==
- Governor of Cherkasy Oblast
