= Vasyl Tsybenko =

Ukrainian politician and diplomat

- Василь Цибенко

Ambassador to Georgia
- In office 10 June 2009 – 18 June 2015
- Preceded by: Mykola Spys
- Succeeded by: Ihor Dolhov

First Deputy Minister of Transport and Communications
- In office 29 November 2005 – 10 August 2006

Ambassador to Kazakhstan
- In office 30 August 2001 – 29 November 2005
- Preceded by: Yevhen Kartashov
- Succeeded by: Mykola Selivon

First Deputy Minister of Transport
- In office 15 November 2000 – 30 August 2001

Deputy Minister of Transport
- In office 15 February 2000 – 15 November 2000

Governor of Cherkasy Oblast
- In office 7 July 1995 – 11 June 1998
- Succeeded by: Anatoliy Danylenko

Presidential Representative of Cherkasy Oblast
- In office 14 February 1994 – 7 July 1995
- Preceded by: Kostiantyn Yastrub

Deputy Chairman of Cherkasy Oblast State Administration
- In office 30 April 1992 – 14 February 1994

Chairman of Cherkasy Oblast Council
- In office June 1994 – 11 June 1998
- Preceded by: Hennadiy Kapralov
- Succeeded by: Volodymyr Lukyanets

Personal details
- Born: Vasyl Hryhorovych Tsybenko; 8 January 1950 (age 76) Verbuvata, Ukrainian SSR, Soviet Union

Vasyl Hryhorovych Tsybenko (Ukrainian: Василь Григорович Цибенко; born 8 January 1950) is a Ukrainian politician and diplomat, who served as ambassador to Georgia from 2009 to 2015. He was also the ambassador to Kazakhstan from 2001 to 2009. He served as the Governor of Cherkasy Oblast from 1995 to 1998, and as Chairman of Cherkasy Oblast Council from 1994 to 1998.

== Biography ==
Vasyl Tsybenko was born on 8 January 1950 in Verbuvata, Khrystynivka Raion, Cherkasy Oblast.

In 1972, he graduated from the Kiev Automobile and Road Institute and began his working route engineer of the Uman Automobile Column No. 2234. He later worked as the head of the operation department and the deputy chief of this column.

In 1977, he was an instructor of the industrial and transport department of the Uman City Communist Party of Ukraine. In 1980, he was an instructor of the Industrial and Transport Department of Cherkasy Regional Committee of the Communist Party of Ukraine.

In 1984, he was a Deputy Head of the Industrial and Transport Division of the Cherkasy Regional Committee of the Communist Party of Ukraine, since 1986.

In 1988, he was elected the first secretary of the Dnieper district committee of the Communist Party of Ukraine in Cherkasy. In 1991, he was the chairman of the Dnieper District Council of People's Deputies of Cherkasy and at the same time the chairman of its executive committee.

On 30 April 1992, he was appointed by the first deputy chairman of the Cherkasy Oblast State Administration.

On 14 February 1994, Tsybenko had been appointed the Presidential Representative of Cherkasy Oblast. In June 1994, he was elected chairman of Cherkasy Oblast Council. On 7 July 1995, Tsybenko became governor of Cherkasy Oblast. On 11 June 1998, he left office.

Head of the Main Directorate for Control over the Enforcement of Acts of the President of Ukraine in the Presidential Administration of Ukraine.

On 20 January 1999, he was the Head of the Main Directorate for Control over the Execution of Acts of the President of Ukraine in the Presidential Administration of Ukraine.

On 15 February 2000, Tysbenko became the Deputy Minister of Transport. On 15 November, he was promoted as first deputy minister.

On 30 August 2001, Tsybenko became the ambassador to Kazakhstan.

On 29 November 2005, he became the First Deputy Minister of Transport and Communications of Ukraine. On 10 August 2006, he had resigned, and had been dismissed by Prime Minister Viktor Yanukovych.

On 10 June 2009, Tysbenko became the ambassador to Georgia. In February 2015, several opposition members expressed dissatisfaction as ruling coalition regretted the position of Tsybenko, justifying the appointment of a former president of Georgia Mikheil Saakashvili, who was the adviser to the president of Ukraine at that time. On 18 June he was dismissed as ambassador by President Petro Poroshenko.
