= Ihor Shevchenko (politician, born 1972) =

Ukrainian politician

- Ігор Шевченко

Governor of Cherkasy Oblast
- In office 30 July 2019 – 4 November 2019
- Preceded by: Taras Vysotsky (acting)
- Succeeded by: Roman Bodnar

Personal details
- Born: Ihor Yuriyovych Shevchenko; 25 December 1972 (age 53) Denhy, Ukrainian SSR, Soviet Union

Ihor Yuriyovych Shevchenko (Ukrainian: Ігор Юрійович Шевченко; born 25 December 1972), is a Ukrainian politician, lawyer and entrepreneur who served as the Governor of Cherkasy Oblast in 2019.

== Biography ==
Ihor Shevchenko was born on 25 December 1972. In September 1991, he studied at Cherkasy PTU No. 13. In February 1993, after graduating from the school in January, he worked as a tailor-outer of male and women's outerwear of the 4th category of production and commercial firm "ARS" in Cherkasy, until July 1996. From July 1996 to November 2001, he was a specialist in personnel work of production and commercial firm "ARS" in Cherkasy. From November 2001, he worked as a private entrepreneur in the field of freight, and was an individual entrepreneur. He owns LLC Export Plus in Ukraine that produces poultry meat and PE "Hermes - Igor Shevchenko" based in Italy.

Shevchenko graduated from the Nakhimov Black Sea Higher Naval School, and in 2014, from the Cherkasy Commercial College in the specialty "Jurisprudence" and National University Odesa Law Academy with the specialty "Law".

On 20 July 2019, Shevchenko became the Governor of Cherkasy Oblast. He was replaced by his successor, Roman Bodnar on 4 November.

== Personal life ==
Shevchenko is fluent in Italian.
