= Serhiy Serhiychuk =

Ukrainian politician (1970–2024)

Governor of Cherkasy Oblast
- In office 28 August 2020 – 29 December 2020
- Preceded by: Roman Bodnar
- Succeeded by: Viktor Husak (acting)

Personal details
- Born: Serhii Ivanovych Serhiychuk; 22 December 1970 Kyiv, Ukrainian Soviet Socialist Republic, U.S.S.R
- Died: 26 August 2024 (aged 53) Kryvyi Rih, Ukraine
- Spouse: Hanna Serhiychuk

Serhiy Serhiychuk (Ukrainian: Сергійчук Сергій Іванович; 22 December 1970 – 27 August 2024) was a Ukrainian military officer and politician, employee of the Security Service of Ukraine later a politician from Kyiv.

He served as the governor of Cherkasy Oblast in 2020.

Serhiychuk was killed in the 26 August 2024 Russian strikes on Ukraine. He was 53.
