= Mount Shchekavytsia orgy =

Ukrainian internet meme

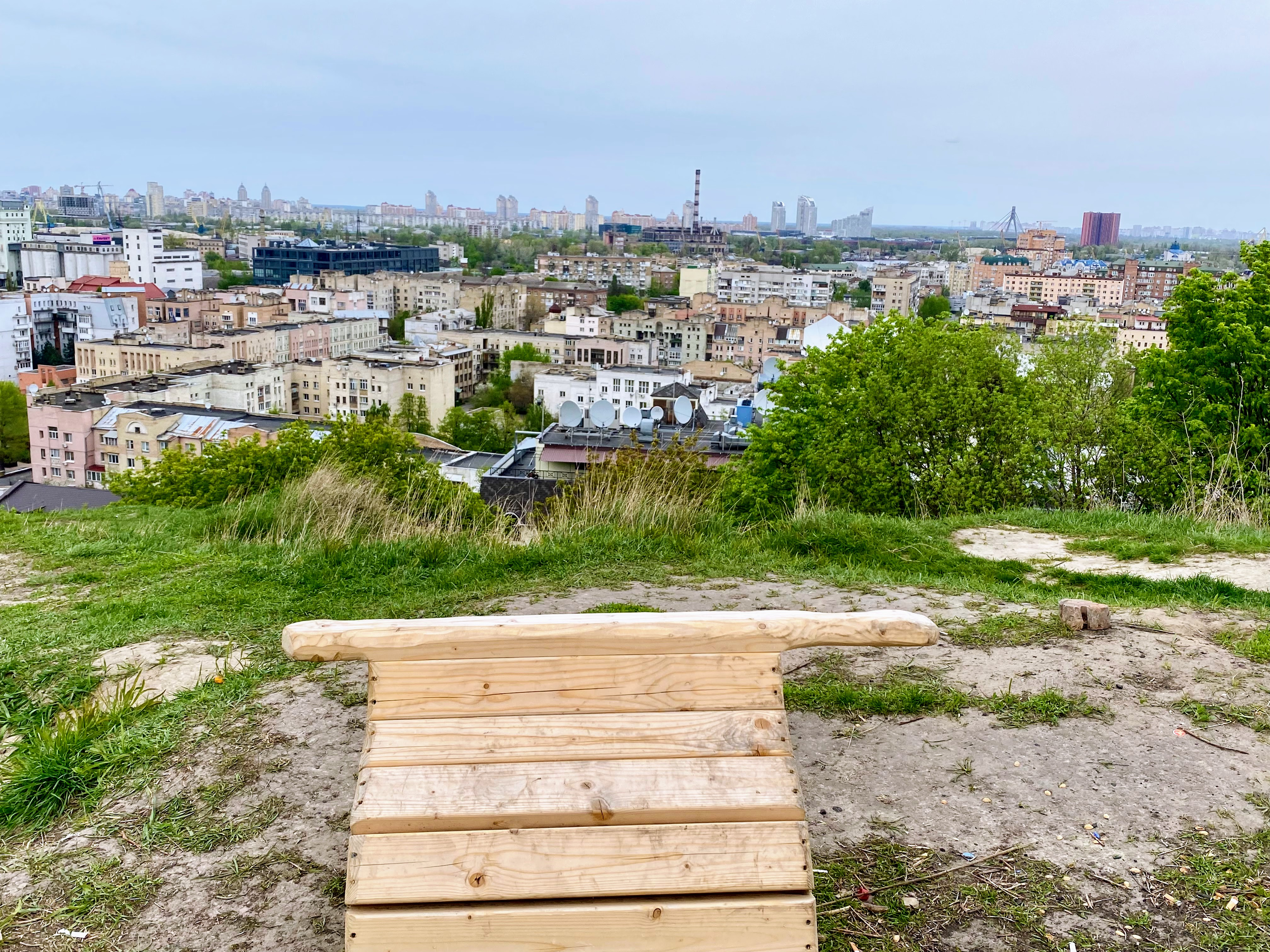
Mount Shchekavytsia

In 2022, a Ukrainian internet meme invited Ukrainians to gather on Mount Shchekavytsia in Kyiv for an orgy in the event of a Russian nuclear strike on Ukraine during the Russo-Ukrainian war.

== Background ==
In late September 2022, 7 months after Russia launched its full-scale invasion of Ukraine, Russian President Vladimir Putin, former Russian President Dmitry Medvedev, and Russian Foreign Minister Sergey Lavrov made a series of nuclear threats. In response, some Ukrainians started making preparations, such as preparing supplies and purchasing potassium iodide tablets to protect from radiation poisoning.

On 26 September, the Telegram channel "Orgy on Shchekavytsia: Official" was created, inviting Ukrainians to meet for an orgy on the hill rather than take shelter if Russia launched a nuclear weapon. Participants were asked to indicate their desired sexual activities through stripes on their hands (e.g. three stripes for anal sex, four stripes for oral sex). By October 2022, 15,000 people had joined the Telegram channel for the event. When an air raid siren sounded on 30 September, a participant asked "Is it time?" with a smiley, and received about 600 smiley reactions. The channel was later removed from Telegram.

== Responses ==
The meme became popular across Ukrainian social media, and the word "Shchekavytsia" was listed on Google Trends. Brands referred to the orgy in their advertising, such as Ukrainian grocery store operator Silpo. Sex toy and personal lubricant companies offered discounts with the promo code "Shchekavytsia". Ukrainian entertainer Verka Serduchka posted about the orgy with an image showing people in underwear under the word "Shchekavytsia".

Ukrainians outside Kyiv discussed additional orgy locations, and spinoff plans were created in other cities, such as another planned orgy on Derybasivska Street in Odesa. The Soloma Cats charity foundation held a first-aid training in October 2022 and chose Mount Shchekavytsia as the location because of the meme, saying "Of course, the training isn't an orgy. But there will be 'scissors', groans and tears!" The training was attended by 140 people, and the foundation said they had trained more than 12,000 people. At Art Basel Paris 2025, Ukrainian artist Nikita Kadan exhibited his charcoal drawing Shchekavytsia as the centrepiece of his solo show. This drawing showed the orgy happening, implying an incoming nuclear strike. The Voloshyn Gallery, which presented the show with Galerie Poggi, called Shchekavytsia "resilience amidst death, a final attempt of love in the face of complete erasure".

== Analysis ==
Ukrainians interviewed by Radio Free Europe/Radio Liberty said the event was an example of the "mega-optimism of Ukrainians", and an "attempt to show that the more they try to scare us, the more we will transform it into something else". BBC Ukraine interviewed a psychologist who said humans were driven in life by Eros and Thanatos—sex and death—and who described humour as a defence mechanism in a situation where one is powerless, such as the threat of a nuclear strike.

Writing in the Nationalities Papers, Neringa Klumbytė and Kateryna Yeremieieva studied the meme as an example of Ukrainian wartime humour, which they argued is "a form of civic activism in the name of Ukraine's sovereignty". They wrote that the orgy plan had led to "civic activism in the public sphere" (the first-aid training event), expressing Ukrainians' solidarity and resistance to intimidation. In the Southern Semiotic Review, Olesia V. Naumovska, Nataliia I. Rudakova, and Nataliia I. Naumovska analysed the meme as an example of modern myth-making, and compared it to other eschatological myths in Ukrainian folklore and poetry. The authors wrote that the orgy meme was the most popular of numerous "jokes and memes united by the theme of how to spend the last moments of life", which came from Ukrainians' "psychological resistance" against Russian nuclear threats.

In the book Dispossession: Anthropological Perspectives on Russia's War Against Ukraine, Laada Bilaniuk analysed memes as "antibodies" defending against the "cultural and ideological" aspects of Russia's invasion, such as the denial of Ukraine's legitimacy as an independent country or the narrative of Ukraine's weakness against Russia. Bilaniuk cited the orgy plan as an example, writing that it "went viral, with similar plans emerging in other cities, generating countless memes", and showing "humour and defiance".

== See also ==
- Nuclear weapons in popular culture
- Dark humour
- Russian warship, go fuck yourself
- Storm Area 51
