= Anatoliy Danylenko =

Ukrainian politician

- Анатолій Даниленко
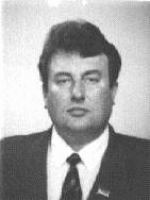

Governor of Cherkasy Oblast
- In office 11 June 1998 – 8 September 1999
- Preceded by: Vasyl Tsybenko
- Succeeded by: Volodymyr Lukyanets

Member of the Verkhovna Rada
- In office 11 May 1994 – 11 June 1998

Personal details
- Born: Anatoliy Stepanovych Danylenko; 4 March 1953 Karapyshi, Ukraine, Soviet Union
- Died: 6 February 2021 (aged 67) Ukraine

Anatoliy Stepanovych Danylenko (Ukrainian: Анатолій Степанович Даниленко; 4 March 1953 – 6 February 2021, Karapyshi, Myronivka Raion, Kyiv Oblast) was a Ukrainian politician who had served as the governor of Cherkasy Oblast from 1998 to 1999.

He also served as a member of the Verkhovna Rada from 1994 to 1998.

He died on 6 February 2021.
