= Viktor Husak =

Ukrainian politician (born 1978)

- Віктор Гусак
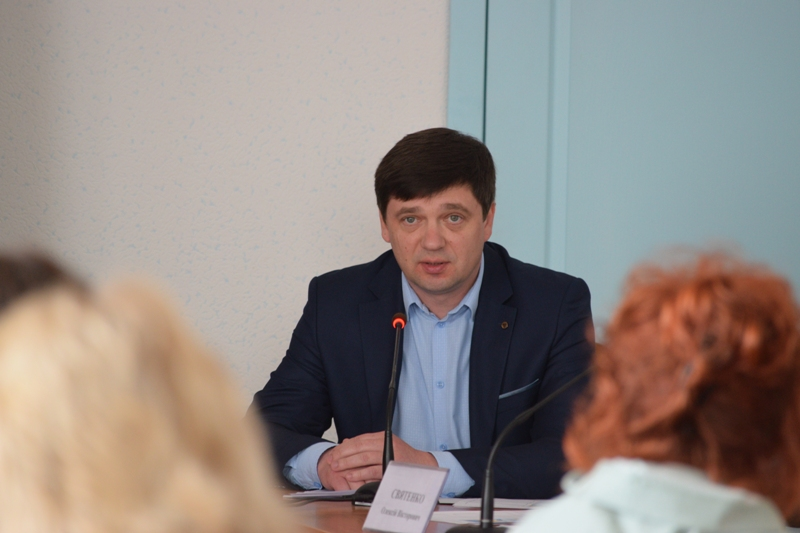

Governor of Cherkasy Oblast (Acting)
- In office 29 December 2020 – 29 January 2021
- Preceded by: Serhiy Serhiychuk
- Succeeded by: Oleksandr Skichko

Deputy Head of the Cherkasy Oblast State Administration
- Incumbent
- Assumed office October 2020

Personal details
- Born: Viktor Hryhorovych Husak; 14 January 1978 (age 48) Ukraine, Soviet Union

Viktor Hryhorovych Husak (Ukrainian: Віктор Григорович Гусак; born 14 January 1978) is a Ukrainian politician who had served as the acting Governor from 2020 to 2021.

He had been the deputy governor of Charkassy Oblast since October 2020.

== Biography ==
Viktor Husak was born on 2 June 1978.

He has higher education.

He worked in the State Treasury Service and was the deputy director of the Finance Department of the Cherkasy Regional State Administration.

Until October 2020, he was Deputy Head of the Main Department of the State Tax Service in Cherkasy Oblast, and has since been the Deputy Head of the Cherkasy Oblast State Administration.

On 29 December 2020, Husak became the acting Governor of Cherkasy Oblast.

On 29 January 2021, his successor, Oleksandr Skichko, officially took over in his place.
