= Roman Bodnar =

Ukrainian politician

- Роман Боднар

Governor of Cherkasy Oblast
- In office 4 November 2019 – 28 August 2020
- President: Volodymyr Zelenskyy
- Prime Minister: Oleksiy Honcharuk; Denys Shmyhal
- Preceded by: Ihor Shevchenko
- Succeeded by: Serhiy Serhiychuk

Personal details
- Born: Roman Mykolayovych Bodnar; 1 February 1974 (age 52) Samhorodok, Koziatyn Raion, Vinnytsia Oblast, Ukrainian SSR, Soviet Union
- Party: Independent
- Education: Odesa Agricultural Institute
- Occupation: Civil servant; politician

Roman Mykolayovych Bodnar (Ukrainian: Роман Миколайович Боднар; born 1 February 1974) is a Ukrainian civil servant and politician, who served as Governor of Cherkasy Oblast from 2019 to 2020.

== Biography ==
Bodnar studied at the Odesa Agricultural Institute (1991–1996).

He is a mechanical engineer by profession.

From 1997 to 1998, he served in the Armed Forces of Ukraine.

He headed the company Promtehproekt in Chernivtsi.

From 2014 to 2019, Bodnar worked at the Security Service.
