= Mykola Semena =

Ukrainian journalist (born 1950)

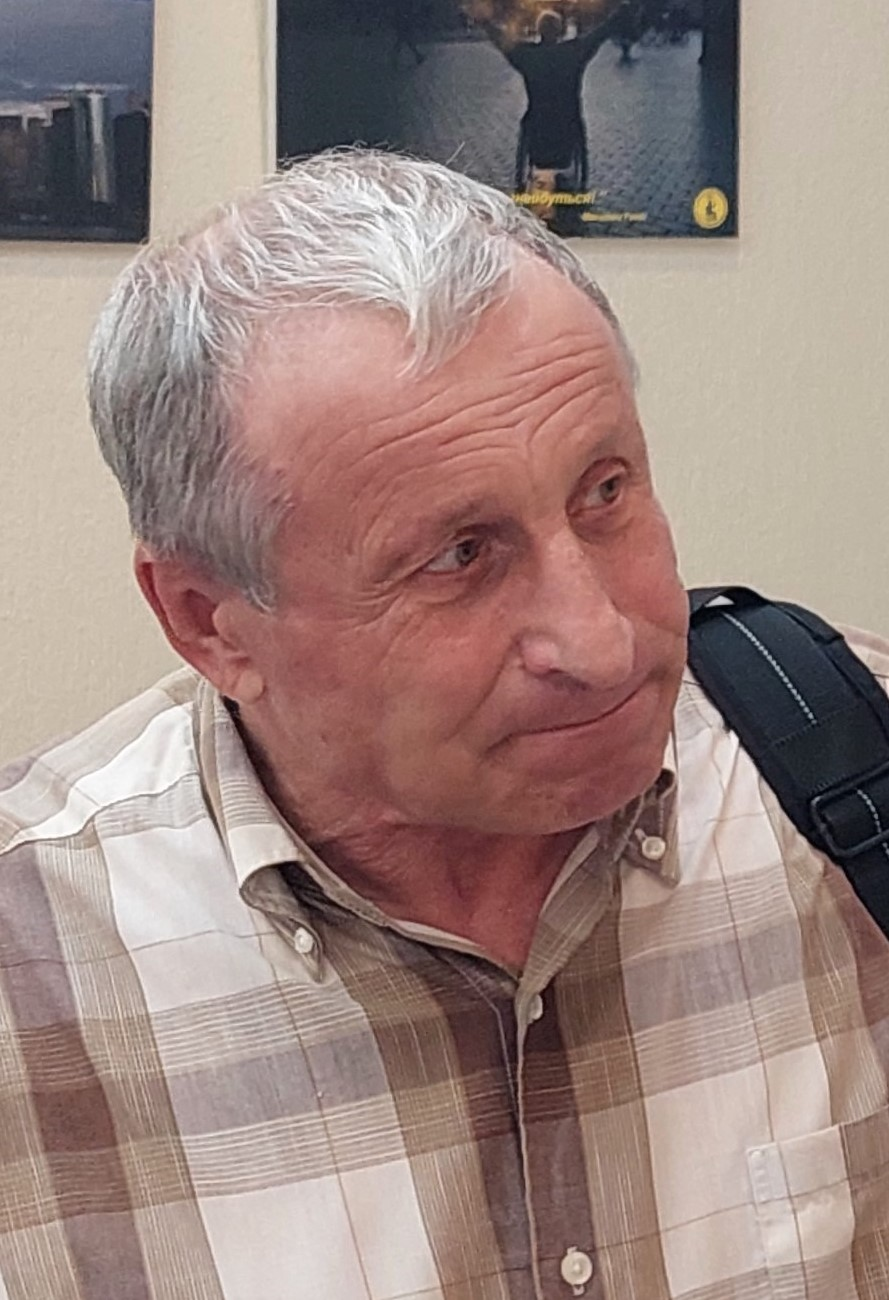
Mykola Semena, 2021

Mykola Mykhailovych Semena (Ukrainian: Микола Михайлович Семена; born 14 May 1950) is a Ukrainian journalist who worked for Radio Free Europe/Radio Liberty (RFE/RL) in the mid-2010s.

In 2016 he was arrested by the Russian authorities in Crimea and was tried in the following year. He was found guilty of separatism, and was barred from working as a journalist. The court sentence was criticized by several Western governments and nongovernmental organizations ("NGOs").

== Career ==
Semena worked for Radio Free Europe/Radio Liberty in the mid-2010s.

In April 2016 he was arrested by Russian authorities in Crimea, and was charged with acting "against the territorial integrity of the Russian Federation." The charge was based on Article 280.1 of the Russian Criminal Code, which had been adopted shortly after Russia's 2014 annexation of Crimea. Article 280.1 criminalized the questioning of Russia's sovereignty over Crimea as Russian territory. In September 2017, he was found guilty of "separatism" and was given a suspended sentence of two and a half years. He was barred for three years from "public activities", including journalism, and was forbidden to leave Russia.

His sentence was criticized as "politically motivated" by a number of Western governments and by over two dozens NGOs, many affiliated with the Helsinki Committee for Human Rights. The Organization for Security and Cooperation in Europe declared that "The case of Semena reminds us all of the arbitrary practice of silencing critical voices in Crimea." RFE/RL described the verdict as "part of an orchestrated effort by Russian authorities in Crimea to silence independent voices." The European Union called Semena's sentencing "a clear violation of the freedom of expression and of the media" and demanded his immediate release, along with that of several other journalists it deemed to have been unjustly imprisoned by Russia. Semena himself called the sentence that had been imposed on him "a sentence against journalism in Russia."

Shortly after his 2016 arrest, Semena received the inaugurative Eastern Partnership Pavel Sheremet Award "in recognition of the fact that he was not afraid to risk his freedom and security, defending free speech in Crimea." He was not allowed to leave Russia to accept the award in person. In February 2019, the Ukrainian Ministry of Information Policy and Ministry of Foreign Affairs nominated Semena and another Ukrainian journalist, Roman Sushchenko—who had likewise been arrested and sentenced by Russia, in the Ukrainian government's view illegally—for the UNESCO/Guillermo Cano World Press Freedom Prize.

In 2019 Semena published a book, The Crimean Report, about Russia's 2014 annexation of Crimea.

== Awards and honours ==
- 2009 – Honored Journalist of Ukraine.
