= Oleksandr Ruzhytskyi =

Ukrainian and Former Soviet Politician

- Олександр Ружицький (Ukrainian)

Head of the Department of Agriculture of the Cherkasy Oblast
- In office 1991–1998

Chairman of the Cherkasy Regional Council of People's Deputies
- In office April 1990 – March 1991
- Preceded by: Office created
- Succeeded by: Volodymyr Shapoval

First Secretary of the Cherkasy Regional Committee of the Communist Party of the Soviet Union
- In office September 1988 – August 1991
- Preceded by: Ivan Lutak
- Succeeded by: Office abolished

Personal details
- Born: Oleksandr Antonovich Ruzhytskyi; 4 January 1938 Malyshivka, Koziatyn Raion, Vinnytsia Oblast, Ukrainian SSR, Soviet Union
- Died: 18 January 2017 (aged 79) Cherkasy, Ukraine
- Citizenship: Ukraine; Soviet Union (until 1991)
- Party: CPSU (until 1991)
- Awards

Oleksandr Antonovych Ruzhytskyi (Ukrainian: Олександр Антонович Ружицький; 4 January 1938 – 18 January 2017) was a Ukrainian and formerly Soviet politician.

== Early life and education ==
Ruzhytskyi was born in the village of Malyshivka in Koziatyn Raion of Vinnytsia Oblast in the Soviet Union on January 4, 1938. He graduated from the Uman Agricultural Institute in 1960. From 1960 to 1961, he worked as the Chief Agronomist of the Zhovten Kolkhoz in Mykolaiv Oblast.

== Political career ==
Ruzhytskyi joined the Communist Party of the Soviet Union in 1961.

He served as the First Secretary of the Yelanets District Committee of the Komsomol of Ukraine from 1961 to 1962. He then served as the Deputy Head of a Kolkhoz in Nova Odesa Raion of Mykolaiv Oblast from 1962 to 1964. From 1964 to 1965, he was once again involved with the Komsomol of Ukraine. From 1965 to 1970, he served as the Second Secretary of the Nova Odesa District Committee of the Communist Party of the Soviet Union and was promoted to First Secretary of the Nova Odesa District Committee in 1970. He continued to work as the First Secretary of the district committee until 1975 when he became an Inspector of the Central Committee of the Communist Party of the Soviet Union. From November 4, 1982 to February 6, 1988, he worked as the Second Secretary of Khmelnytskyi Regional Committee of the Communist Party of the Soviet Union. From September 1988 to August 1991, Ruzhytskyi served as the First Secretary of the Cherkasy Regional Committee of the Communist Party of the Soviet Union. From April 1990 to March 1991, he was the Chairman of the Cherkasy Regional Council of People's Deputies.

From 1991 to 1998, Ruzhytskyi served as the Head of the Department of Agriculture of Cherkasy Oblast.

== Death ==
Oleksandr Ruzhytskyi died in Cherkasy, Ukraine on January 18, 2017.

== Awards ==
- (Soviet Union) Order of the Red Banner of Labour (twice)
- (Soviet Union) Order of the Badge of Honour (twice)
- Diploma of the Presidium of the Verkhovna Rada of the Ukrainian Soviet Socialist Republic (1987)
- Diploma of the Chairman of the Verkhovna Rada of Ukraine (2003)
- Medal "25 years of Independence of Ukraine" (2016)

== See also ==
- Kolkhoz
- Cherkasy
