= Governor of Cherkasy Oblast =

Chief executive of Cherkasy Oblast, Ukraine

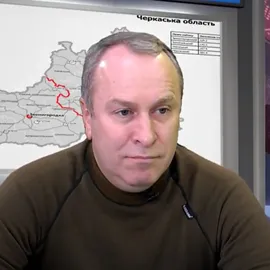
- Incumbent; Ihor Taburets since 2 March 2022
- Residence: Cherkasy
- Inaugural holder: Kostiantyn Yastrub
- Formation: March 20, 1992 as Presidential representative of Ukraine
- Website: Government of Cherkasy Oblast

The governor of Cherkasy Oblast is the head of executive branch for the Cherkasy Oblast.

The office of governor is an appointed position, with officeholders being appointed by the president of Ukraine, on recommendation from the prime minister of Ukraine.

The official residence for the governor is located in Cherkasy. The governor is Ihor Taburets was appointed on 2 March 2022 by President Volodymyr Zelenskyy. Taburets was appointed on the seventh day of the 2022 Russian invasion of Ukraine.

== Governors ==
=== Representative of the President ===
- 1992 – 1994 Kostiantyn Yastrub
- 1994 – 1994 Vasyl Tsybenko

=== Chairman of the Executive Committee ===
- 1994 – 1995 Vasyl Tsybenko

=== Heads of the Administration ===
- 1995 – 1998 Vasyl Tsybenko
- 1998 – 1999 Anatoliy Danylenko
- 1999 – 2002 Volodymyr Lukyanets
- 2002 – 2005 Vadym Lyoshenko
- 2005 – 2010 Oleksandr Cherevko
- 2010 – 2010 Petro Haman (acting)
- 2010 – 2014 Serhiy Tulub
- 2014 – 2018 Yuriy Tkachenko
- 2018 – 2019 Oleksandr Velbivets
- 2019 – 2019 Taras Vysotsky (acting)
- 2019 – 2019 Ihor Shevchenko
- 2019 – 2020 Roman Bodnar
- 2020 Serhiy Serhiychuk
- 2020 – 2021 Viktor Husak (acting)
- 2020 – 2022 Oleksandr Skichko
- 2 March 2022 – present Ihor Taburets

== See also ==
- Cherkasy Oblast Council
