= Volodymyr Shapoval =

Ukrainian Soviet politician and activist (1934–2023)

- Володимир Шаповал
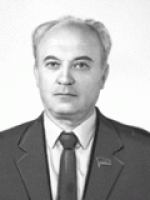

Member of the Verkhovna Rada
- In office 15 May 1990 – 15 May 1994

Chairman of the Cherkasy Oblast Council
- In office 1991 – 15 May 1991
- Preceded by: Oleksandr Ruzhytskyi
- Succeeded by: Kostiantyn Yastrub

Chairman of the Cherkasy Regional executive committee
- In office 1979–1991
- Preceded by: Alexander Gritsay
- Succeeded by: Kostiantyn Yastrub

Personal details
- Born: 9 April 1934; Starosillia, Kyiv Oblast, Ukrainian SSR, USSR (now Horodyshchenskyi district, Cherkasy Oblast, Ukraine)
- Died: 25 November 2023 (aged 89)

Volodymyr Nikiforovych Shapoval (Ukrainian: Володимир Никифорович Шаповал, 9 April 1934 – 25 November 2023) was a Ukrainian politician who served as a Member of the Verkhovna Rada from 1990 to 1994.

== Biography ==
As a Soviet and communist activist, he was a chairman of the executive committee of the Cherkasy Oblast Council.

He had been the deputy of the Verkhovna Rada of the Ukrainian SSR of the 10th and 11th convocations. At the same time, from December 1979 - September 1991, he was the Chairman of the Executive Committee of the Cherkasy Oblast Council of People's Deputies.

He was a member of the Audit Commission of the Communist Party of Ukraine in 1986 to 1990.

On 18 March 1990, he was elected People's Deputy of Ukraine, 2nd round, 56.13% of votes, 4 applicants. He was sworn into office on 15 May.

From March to September 1991, the chairman of the Cherkasy Oblast Council of People's Deputies.

He was a member of the "Agrarians" and "For Social Justice" groups. He was a member of the Commission of the Verkhovna Rada on issues of the agro-industrial complex.

He was a ember of the Central Committee of the Communist Party of Ukraine from 1990 until 1991.

Shapoval died on 25 November 2023, at the age of 89.
