= Volodymyr Lukyanets =

- Володимир Лук'янець

Governor of Cherkasy Oblast
- In office 8 September 1999 – 14 November 2002
- Preceded by: Anatoliy Danylenko
- Succeeded by: Vadym Lyoshenko

Chairman of Cherkasy Oblast Council
- In office 11 June 1998 – 5 July 2001
- Preceded by: Vasyl Tsybenko
- Succeeded by: Vikor Pavlichenko

Personal details
- Born: Volodymyr Lukych Lukyanets; 16 June 1956 Bakeyeve, Ukraine, Soviet Union
- Died: 13 January 2014 (aged 57) Cherkasy, Ukraine
- Party: Social Democratic Party of Ukraine

Volodymyr Lukych Lukyanets (Ukrainian: Володимир Лукич Лук'янець; 16 June 1956 – 13 January 2014) was a Ukrainian politician who had served as the governor of Cherkasy Oblast from 1999 to 2002.

== Biography ==
Volodymyr Lukyanets was born on 16 June 1956 in Bakeyeve, Cherkasy Oblast, to a family of collective farmers.

In 1973, after graduation, he worked as a worker, a technician of a dairy farm, a sports instructor and assistant to the Rodnikovka Rodnikovka Educational Education Brigadier. Continuing to work, he graduated from the Uman Agricultural Institute in 1979.

In the same year, he was at the Komsomol work, and from 1982 to February 1985, he headed the collective farm named after Frunze of the Umansky district.

Between February 1985 tand March 1990 he worked on Komsomol and party work: the first secretary of the Cherkasy regional committee of the Komsomol and the first secretary of the Khristinovsky district committee of the Communist Party. In 1989, he graduated from a higher party school.

In March 1990, he was elected the head of the Khristinovsky District Council of People's Deputies.

From December 1991 to February 1994, he worked as the director of the Niva Elite-Semenary Economy of the Khristinovsky District.

From February to June 1994, he was the first deputy head of the Cherkasy Oblast administration, and from June 1994 to July 1995, he was the First Deputy Head of the Cherkasy Regional Executive Committee for executive work. From July 1995 to June 1998, he was the First Deputy Head of the Cherkasy Oblast Administration.

On 10 April 1998, he was elected the head of the Cherkasy Щидфые Council.

On 10 September 1999, Lukyantes was appointed Governor of Cherkasy Oblast.

On 14 November 2002, by decree "On the personal responsibility of the heads of central and local executive bodies", he was fired as Governor and was replaced by his successor, Vadym Lyoshenko. After his dismissal, he worked as the general director of the state enterprise Zlatodar.

In 2003, he defended his PhD thesis in the specialty 06.01.01 – general agriculture on the topic: "Optimization of the structure of agricultural lands and precursors of winter wheat for Cherkasy region in the transition of the village to market relations".

He died on 13 January 2014.
