= All-Ukrainian Union "Cherkashchany" =

All-Ukrainian Association "Cherkashchany" Всеукраїнське об'єднання «Черкащани»
- Chairman: Anatoliy Semynoha
- Founded: June 20, 1992
- Registered: 23 November 1992
- Ideology: Agrarianism; Christian democracy Social democracy
- Verkhovna Rada: 0 / 450
- Cherkasy Oblast Council: 18 / 64

Website
- cherkashchanu.com

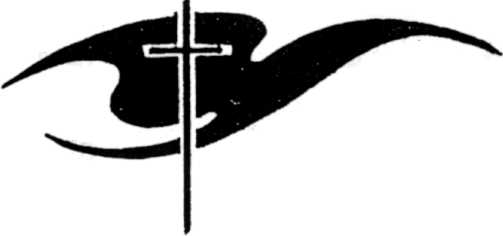
The old logo of the Christian Democratic Party of Ukraine

All-Ukrainian Union "Cherkashchany" (Ukrainian: Всеукраїнське об'єднання «Черкащани», romanized: Vseukrainske obiednannia «Cherkashchany») is a regional political party in Cherkasy Oblast, Ukraine. It was registered on November 23, 1992.

Until 2006, the party was known as Christian-Democratic Party of Ukraine (Ukrainian: Християнсько-демократична партія України, romanized: Khrystyiansko-demokratychna partiia Ukrainy) and had links with the Christian Liberal Party of Ukraine of Leonid Chernovetskyi (Leonid Chernovetskyi Bloc).

In the 2020 Ukrainian local elections, it won a plurality of 18 out of 64 seats in the Cherkasy Oblast Council.

== Election results ==
=== Cherkasy Oblast Council ===
Election	Popular vote	Percentage	Overall seats	Change	Government
2015	70 654	15,54	16 / 84	▲16	
2020	67 002	28,13	18 / 64	▲2	
