= Anton Yatsenko =

Ukrainian politician (born 1977)

- Антон Яценко
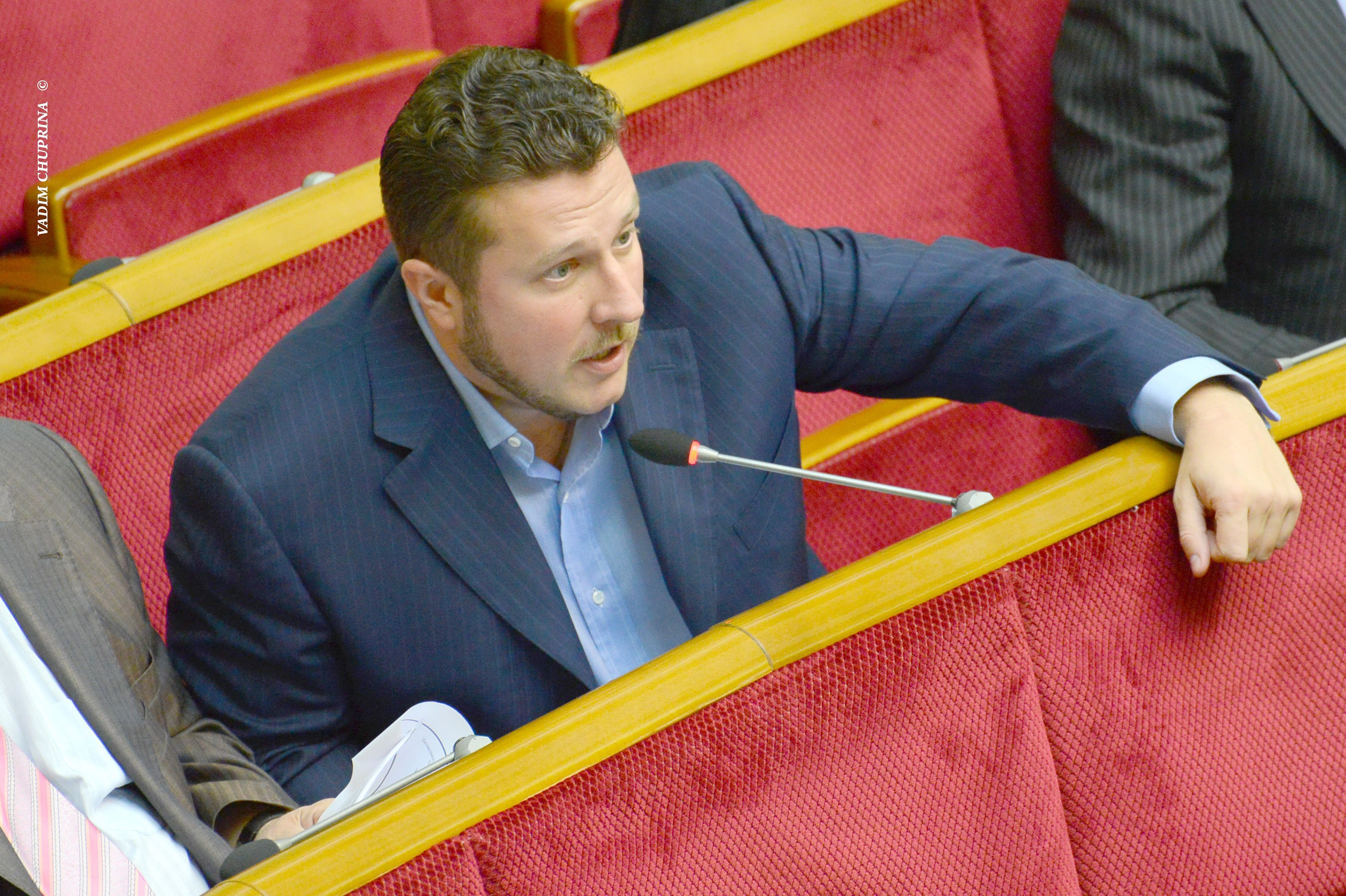
- Yatsenko in 2013

People's Deputy of Ukraine
- Incumbent
- Assumed office 23 November 2007
- Preceded by: Constituency established (2012)
- Constituency: Yulia Tymoshenko Bloc, No. 79 (2007–2012); Cherkasy Oblast, No. 200 (2012–present)

Personal details
- Born: 13 July 1977 (age 49) Kyiv, Ukrainian SSR, Soviet Union (now Ukraine)
- Party: Independent
- Other political affiliations: Yulia Tymoshenko Bloc (2007–2011); Party of Regions (2011–2014); Revival (2014–2019); For the Future (2019–2021); Batkivshchyna (before 2011, 2021–2022)
- Education: Kyiv National Economic University

Anton Volodymyrovych Yatsenko (Ukrainian: Антон Володимирович Яценко; born 13 July 1977) is a Ukrainian politician currently serving as a People's Deputy of Ukraine representing Ukraine's 200th electoral district as an independent since 2012, having previously been a member of the Party of Regions. Previously, he served as a party list People's Deputy from Yulia Tymoshenko Bloc from 2007 to 2012.

== Early life and career ==
Anton Volodymyrovych Yatsenko was born on 13 July 1977 in the Ukrainian capital of Kyiv. From 1993 to 1998, he studied at the Kyiv National Economic University, graduating with a specialisation in management of foreign economic activity. He again studied at Kyiv National Economic University until 2007 to become a lawyer.

Prior to entering the political scene himself, Yatsenko was assistant to multiple other People's Deputies of Ukraine, working at public events for Mykola Karnaukh, Vasyl Tsushko, Mykola Odainyk, and Serhiy Osyka. He also worked as vice-rector of Kyiv National Economic University from 2004 to 2005, and in the Office of the President of Ukraine, serving as head of the information and analytical department of the Department for Socio-Political Affairs of the Main Department for Internal Policy. At the time of his election in 2007, he was a researcher at the National Academy of Sciences of Ukraine.

== Political career ==
Yatsenko ran in the 2007 Ukrainian parliamentary election as the 79th candidate on the party list of the Yulia Tymoshenko Bloc. At the time, he was a member of Batkivshchyna. In 2011, he defected from Batkivshchyna to the pro-Russian Party of Regions, and he was subsequently re-elected to the Verkhovna Rada (Ukraine's parliament) the next year in Ukraine's 200th electoral district (located around the city of Uman in western Cherkasy Oblast), winning with 29.90% of the vote. He voted for the bill "On the Principles of State Language Policy" strengthening the status of the Russian language in Ukraine. In 2014, amidst Euromaidan, he was among the People's Deputies who voted in favour of the anti-protest laws. The same year, he left the Party of Regions faction.

In the 2014 Ukrainian parliamentary election, Yatsenko ran for re-election in the 200th electoral district, this time as an independent. His margin of victory increased dramatically from two years prior, with 57.41% of voters selecting him (an increase of 27.51% from 2012). In the Verkhovna Rada, he joined the pro-Russian Revival faction, and became one of the party's more prominent members, serving on its presidium and becoming its deputy chair in 2018. He was also head of the subcommittee on legislating administrative offences within the Verkhovna Rada Law Enforcement Committee.

Yatsenko again ran for re-election as an independent in the 200th electoral district during the 2019 Ukrainian parliamentary election, and again increased his margin of victory, this time winning 69.08% of the vote - the highest percentage of any People's Deputy in the 9th Ukrainian Verkhovna Rada. The only other candidate to place above 10% in the election was Olena Vorontsova of Servant of the People. His campaign was also the most expensive in Cherkasy Oblast, with ₴6,910,325 being spent on his re-election. According to anti-corruption non-governmental organisation Chesno, the majority of Yatsenko's funding came from relatives, particularly his wife, father-in-law, and sister.

In the Verkhovna Rada, Yatsenko became a member of the Verkhovna Rada Committee on Environmental Policy and Nature Management, and he also joined the For the Future faction on 13 September 2019. Two years later, he left the party, rejoining Batkivshchyna ten years after he originally left the party. However, his alignment with the party did not last long, and he left the party on 25 March 2022. On 5 October 2022, he left the Verkhovna Rada Committee on Environmental Policy and Nature Management to join the Verkhovna Rada Committee on Organisation of State Power, Local Self-Government, Regional Development, and Urban Planning.

== Controversies ==
=== Sexist remarks ===
Yatsenko has faced controversy for a history of making sexist remarks, such as a claim that an employee of the Uman City Council only got her job because of her physical appearance. The Uman City Council claimed it was being threatened by Yatsenko, with the female employees saying that he had said that local newspapers would disparage them and the head of the department for interaction with People's Deputies saying his department had been threatened with closure. Yatsenko refuted the comments, saying that he had never written the comments, and additionally accused the city council of embezzlement.

=== Cyborg defamation lawsuit ===
In late June 2018, Yatsenko claimed without evidence that Cyborg fighter Oleh Hervas from Cherkasy Oblast was a "marauder and murderer", an allegation that brought Hervas to file a lawsuit. The Pecherskyi District Court in Kyiv, hearing the case, subsequently ordered Yatsenko to pay ₴5,000 to Hervas for "moral damages" on 24 January 2020. It additionally ordered him to refute his prior statements online.

=== Piano voting ===
Yatsenko has a reputation in Ukrainian journalistic and anti-corruption circles for his propensity towards piano voting, having the highest record of known instances of piano voting than any other People's Deputy in 2018. Chesno has recorded 129 instances of piano voting by Yatsenko as of December 2022.

=== Corruption scandals and pork-barrelling ===
In addition to his record for piano voting, Yatsenko has maintained a record for having the most development subsidies invested into his electoral district. In 2018, the 200th electoral district received ₴29.8 million, of which half went to the funding of new squares in Uman and Khrystynivka. In the local media, Yatsenko was credited as responsible for the development of these projects.

Yatsenko is additionally involved in several investigations for corruption. The State Property Fund of Ukraine, a government organisation responsible for establishing a database of all property in Ukraine and appraising it, lost millions of hryvnias through a pyramid scheme involving intermediary sites used by appraisers. When the Verkhovna Rada attempted to pass a law banning the practice, a group of deputies from Servant of the People attempted to push through an alternative bill, in line with Yatsenko's position. The faction leadership of Servant of the People suspected Yatsenko of being involved in an attempt to bribe People's Deputies, and subsequently subjected those responsible for introducing the bill to a polygraph test. However, the alternative bill failed to pass, and the original bill successfully became law.
