= Ihor Taburets =

Ukrainian politician (born 1973)

- Ігор Табурець
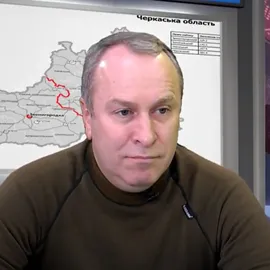
- Taburets in 2022

Governor of Cherkasy Oblast
- Incumbent
- Assumed office 1 March 2022
- Preceded by: Oleksandr Skichko

Personal details
- Born: 6 December 1973 (age 52) Cherkasy, Cherkasy Oblast, Ukrainian SSR, Soviet Union

Major General Ihor Ivanovych Taburets (Ukrainian: Ігор Іванович Табурець; born on 6 December 1973) is a Ukrainian politician, activist and intelligence officer who is currently the Governor of Cherkasy Oblast since 1 March 2022.

== Biography ==
Taburets was born on 6 December 1973 in Cherkasy, Soviet Ukraine.

Taburets worked as an adviser to the former Governor of Cherkasy Oblast, Oleksandr Skichko. He served in the Main Intelligence Directorate (HUR) of the Ministry of Defense of Ukraine as a major general, and formerly as deputy chief of the Main Directorate of Intelligence of the Ministry of Defense of Ukraine. He was also an advisor to the Committee of the Verkhovna Rada on National Security, Defense and Intelligence.

On 1 March 2022, Ukrainian President Volodymyr Zelenskyy appointed Taburets as Governor of Cherkasy Oblast.
