= Kostiantyn Yastrub =

Ukrainian politician (1935–2022)

Chairman of the Cherkasy Oblast Council
- In office 3 September 1991 – April 1992
- Preceded by: Volodymyr Shapoval
- Succeeded by: Hennadiy Kapralov

Personal details
- Born: Kostiantyn Pylypovych Yastrub; 25 February 1935 Honoratka, Vinnytsia Raion, Ukrainian SSR, Soviet Union
- Died: 20 January 2022 (aged 86)
- Party: CPSU

Kostiantyn Pylypovych Yastrub (Ukrainian: Костянтин Пилипович Яструб; 25 February 1935 – 20 January 2022) was a Ukrainian politician. A member of the Communist Party, he served as Chairman of the Cherkasy Oblast Council from 1991 to 1992. He died on 20 January 2022, at the age of 86.

== Biography ==
He was born in the family of an employee. After graduating from school, he entered the Horodyshche Agricultural Technical College. Then he graduated from the Ukrainian Agricultural Academy, obtained the specialty of scientist-agronomist.

He started working in 1959 as a shift agronomist-technologist at the Lebedynskyi seed plant of the Shpola district of the Cherkasy region. Member of the CPSU.

In the 1970s, he worked in the Department of Agriculture of the Cherkasy Regional Executive Committee, was the deputy head, and for six years the head of the Department of Agriculture. Was in party work: instructor, head of department of the Cherkasy Regional Committee of the Communist Party of Ukraine.

In 1982, he graduated from the Academy of Social Sciences under the Central Committee of the CPSU in Moscow.

From 1982 to 1991, he was the secretary of the Cherkasy Regional Committee of the Communist Party of Ukraine on Agriculture.

In March - September 1991 he was the 1st Deputy Chairman of the Executive Committee of the Cherkasy Oblast Council of People's Deputies.

From September 1991 to April 1992, he was the chairman of the Cherkasy Oblast Council of People's Deputies and its executive committee.
