= Roman Sushchenko =

Ukrainian journalist and artist

- Роман Сущенко
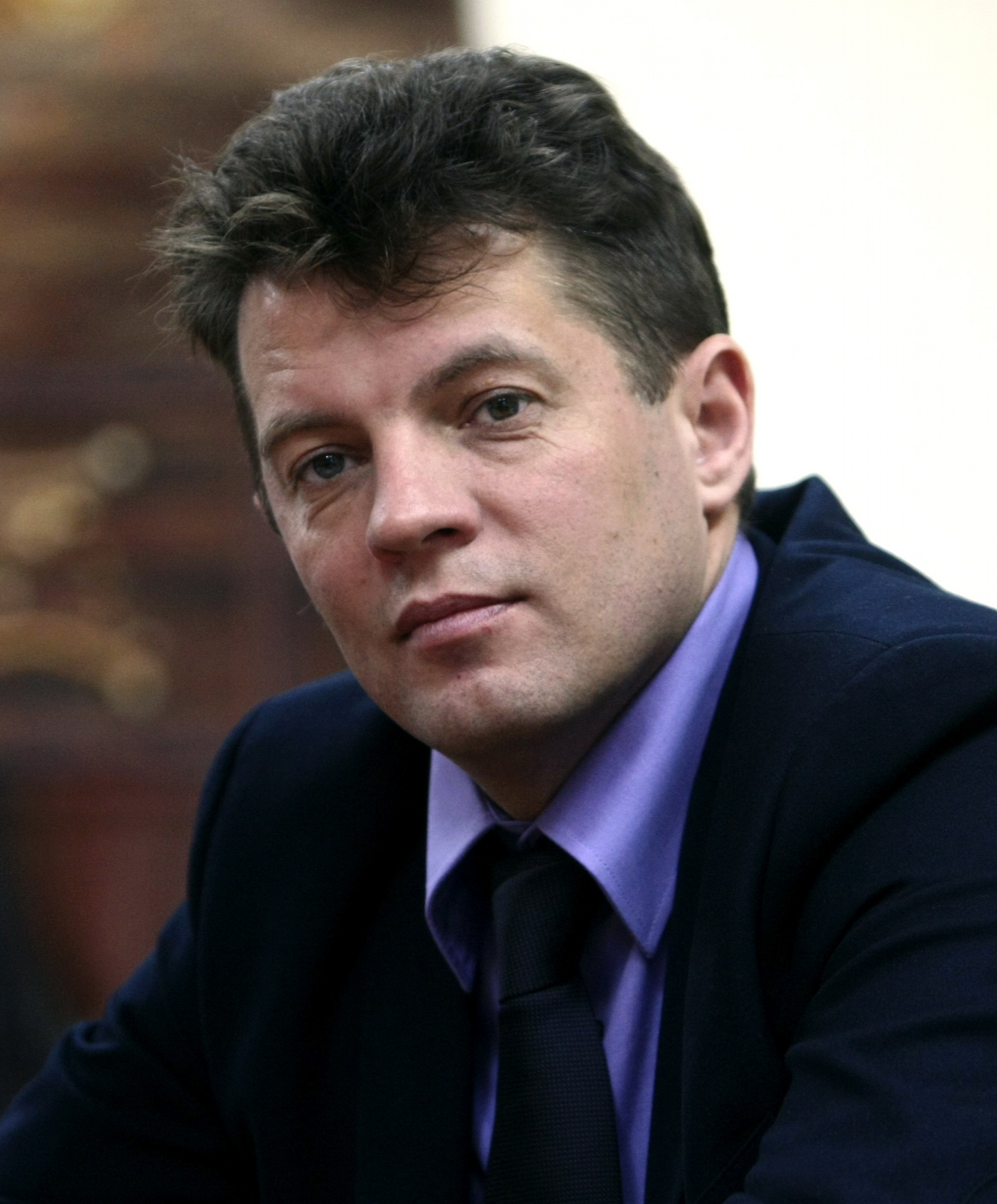
- Sushchenko in 2011
- Born: 8 February 1969 (age 57); Cherkasy, Ukrainian SSR, Soviet Union
- Citizenship: Ukraine
- Education: Taras Shevchenko National University of Kyiv
- Occupations: Journalist; artist; politician
- Awards

Roman Volodymyrovych Sushchenko (Ukrainian: Роман Володимирович Сущенко; born 8 February 1969) is a Ukrainian journalist and artist. He was arrested in Russia on spying charges in 2016, and sentenced in 2018; his detention and sentence have been criticized by a number of Ukrainian and international agencies. Sushchenko was released in September 2019.

== Career ==
Sushchenko was born on 8 February 1969 in Cherkasy. He started his career in journalism in Ukraine in 2002 working for the Ukrinform, Ukraine's state news agency. From 2010 he worked in France, where he was a vocal critic of Russian propaganda.

He is also an artist. His works have been displayed in Ukraine, Poland and France, among other countries.

== Detention ==
On 30 September 2016, he was arrested in Moscow on charges of espionage and detained in the Lefortovo Prison. Russia's Federal Security Service accused him of conducting espionage for the Chief Directorate of Intelligence of the Ministry of Defence of Ukraine. The Ukrainian Ministry of Defense refuted this claim and Sushchenko himself denied the charges. The Ukrainian Foreign Ministry also protested against the arrest, calling it "another step in the purposeful policy of the Russian Federation to use Ukrainians, who are in the hands of the authorities, as political hostages in its hybrid aggression against our country." After two years in detention, on June 4, 2018, the Moscow City Court found Sushchenko guilty of spying and sentenced him to 12 years in a maximum security prison. He was serving his sentence in the Penal Colony No. 11 (IK-11). Ukrainian President Petro Poroshenko condemned the verdict, stating it is based on false charges, and awarded Sushchenko the Ukrainian Order For Courage 3rd Class.

Sushchenko stated that he was subjected to psychological torture. Ukrainian Human Rights Commissioner Lyudmyla Denisova criticized his conditions, stating that he has been "subjected to inhuman treatment". During the trial, his lawyer was also subject to harassment, including losing his status as the lawyer.

=== Aftermath and reactions ===
Shortly before his verdict was announced, Sushchenko won the Ukrainian Ihor Lubchenko prize for defending freedom of speech. French journalist Galia Ackerman has also criticized the arrest of Sushchenko. Ukrinform has protested against the arrest of their employee.

PEN America has described Sushchenko's detention and classified him as one of the "writers at risk". His case has also been described by the Committee to Protect Journalists, an organization which criticized Russian authorities for failing to back up their allegations with "a shred of evidence". The Organization for Security and Co-operation in Europe has called for his release, as did the National Union of Journalists of Ukraine, the Polish Journalist Association, the International Federation of Journalists and the European Federation of Journalists.

On 16 March 2018 the European Parliament named 30 Ukrainian citizens (including Sushchenko) who it considers illegally detained or imprisoned in Russia, and called for their release. The Sejm of Poland adopted a resolution on 15 June 2018 demanding the release of Ukrainians imprisoned in Russia for political reasons. In the resolution, deputies demand, in particular, to release Oleh Sentsov, Oleksandr Kolchenko, and Roman Sushchenko.

In February 2019, the Ukrainian Ministry of Information Policy and Ministry of Foreign Affairs nominated Sushchenko and another Ukrainian journalist, Mykola Semena, also arrested and sentenced by Russia in a way the Ukrainian government finds illegal, for the UNESCO/Guillermo Cano World Press Freedom Prize.

== Release ==
Roman Sushchenko was released with swap between Russia and Ukraine, 35 prisoners to 35, on 7 September 2019. When the plane with 35 freed Ukrainians landed in Kyiv, they were met by President Volodymyr Zelenskyy and relatives.
